= 1959 Big Ten Conference football season =

- Sport: American football
- Teams: 10
- Top draft pick: Jim Houston
- Champion: Wisconsin
- Runners-up: Michigan State
- Season MVP: Bill Burrell

Seasons
- ← 1958 1960 →

1959 Big Ten Conference football standings
| | Conf. | | | | | Overall |
| Team | W | | L | | T | W | | L | | T |
|---|---|---|---|---|---|---|---|---|---|---|
| No. 6 Wisconsin $ | 5 | – | 2 | – | 0 | 7 | – | 3 | – | 0 |
| Michigan State | 4 | – | 2 | – | 0 | 5 | – | 4 | – | 0 |
| Purdue | 4 | – | 2 | – | 1 | 5 | – | 2 | – | 2 |
| No. 13 Illinois | 4 | – | 2 | – | 1 | 5 | – | 3 | – | 1 |
| Northwestern | 4 | – | 3 | – | 0 | 6 | – | 3 | – | 0 |
| Iowa | 3 | – | 3 | – | 0 | 5 | – | 4 | – | 0 |
| Michigan | 3 | – | 4 | – | 0 | 4 | – | 5 | – | 0 |
| Indiana | 2 | – | 4 | – | 1 | 4 | – | 4 | – | 1 |
| Ohio State | 2 | – | 4 | – | 1 | 3 | – | 5 | – | 1 |
| Minnesota | 1 | – | 6 | – | 0 | 2 | – | 7 | – | 0 |
$ – Conference champion; Rankings from AP Poll

The 1959 Big Ten Conference football season was the 64th season of college football played by the member schools of the Big Ten Conference and was a part of the 1959 college football season.

The 1959 Wisconsin Badgers football team, under head coach Milt Bruhn, won the Big Ten championship, was ranked No. 6 in the final AP Poll, and lost to Washington in the 1960 Rose Bowl. Tackle Dan Lanphear was a consensus first-team All-American. Quarterback Dale Hackbart led the Big Ten with 1,121 yards of total offense.

== Season overview ==
=== Results and team statistics ===
| Conf. Rank | Team | Head coach | AP final | AP high | Overall record | Conf. record | PPG | PAG | MVP |
|---|---|---|---|---|---|---|---|---|---|
| 1 | Wisconsin | Milt Bruhn | #6 | #5 | 7–3 | 5–2 | 16.5 | 14.9 | Jerry Stalcup |
| 2 | Michigan State | Duffy Daugherty | NR | #11 | 5–4 | 4–2 | 16.6 | 13.1 | Dean Look |
| 3 (tie) | Purdue | Jack Mollenkopf | NR | #6 | 5–2–2 | 4–2–1 | 12.1 | **9.0** | Len Jardine |
| 3 (tie) | Illinois | Ray Eliot | #13 | #12 | 5–3–1 | 4–2–1 | 12.3 | 10.3 | **Bill Burrell** |
| 5 | Northwestern | Ara Parseghian | NR | #2 | 6–3 | 4–3 | 19.3 | 14.9 | Jim Andreotti |
| 6 | Iowa | Forest Evashevski | NR | #5 | 5–4 | 3–3 | **25.9** | 11.1 | Don Norton |
| 7 | Michigan | Bump Elliott | NR | NR | 4–5 | 3–4 | 13.6 | 17.9 | Tony Rio |
| 8 | Indiana | Phil Dickens | NR | NR | 4–4–1 | 2–4–1 | 15.8 | 11.7 | Ted Aucreman |
| 9 | Ohio State | Woody Hayes | NR | #7 | 3–5–1 | 2–4–1 | 9.2 | 12.7 | Jim Houston |
| 10 | Minnesota | Murray Warmath | NR | NR | 2–7 | 1–6 | 10.9 | 17.7 | Tom Moe |

Key
AP final = Team's rank in the final AP Poll of the 1959 season
AP high = Team's highest rank in the AP Poll throughout the 1959 season
PPG = Average of points scored per game
PAG = Average of points allowed per game
MVP = Most valuable player as voted by players on each team as part of the voting process to determine the winner of the Chicago Tribune Silver Football trophy; trophy winner in bold

=== Preseason ===
On November 14, 1958, Bennie Oosterbaan resigned as Michigan's head football coach with two games remaining in the program's worst season since 1936. Bump Elliott, who had been Michigan's backfield coach for two years, was hired to replace him.

=== Post-season developments ===
Shortly before the end of the 1959 season, Illinois head coach Ray Eliot retired after 18 years in the position. On December 22, 1959, Illinois hired 33-year-old Pete Elliott as its new head football coach. Elliott had played for Michigan and served as California's head coach from 1957 to 1959.

== Statistical leaders ==
The Big Ten's individual statistical leaders for the 1959 season include the following:

=== Passing yards ===
| Rank | Name | Team | Yards |
|---|---|---|---|
| 1 | Olen Treadway | Iowa | 1,014 |
| 2 | Dean Look | Michigan State | 785 |
| 3 | John Talley | Northwestern | 783 |
| 4 | Stan Noskin | Michigan | 747 |
| 5 | Dale Hackbart | Wisconsin | 734 |

=== Rushing yards ===
| Rank | Name | Team | Yards |
|---|---|---|---|
| 1 | Bob Jeter | Iowa | 609 |
| 2 | Bill Brown | Illinois | 504 |
| 3 | Ted Smith | Indiana | 439 |
| 4 | Herb Adderley | Michigan State | 419 |
| 5 | Johnny Counts | Illinois | 416 |

=== Receiving yards ===
| Rank | Name | Team | Yards |
|---|---|---|---|
| 1 | Don Norton | Iowa | 428 |
| 2 | Tom Hall | Minnesota | 322 |
| 3 | Johnny Counts | Illinois | 314 |
| 4 | Allan Schoonover | Wisconsin | 290 |
| 5 | Ray Purdin | Northwestern | 280 |

=== Total yards ===
| Rank | Name | Team | Yards |
|---|---|---|---|
| 1 | Dale Hackbart | Wisconsin | 1,121 |
| 2 | Olen Treadway | Iowa | 987 |
| 3 | Dean Look | Michigan State | 875 |
| 4 | John Talley | Northwestern | 777 |
| 5 | Stan Noskin | Michigan | 718 |

=== Scoring ===
| Rank | Name | Team | Points |
|---|---|---|---|
| 1 | Dale Hackbart | Wisconsin | 36 |
| 2 | Gary Ballman | Michigan State | 30 |
| 2 | Ron Burton | Northwestern | 30 |
| 2 | Tom Wiesner | Wisconsin | 30 |

== Awards and honors ==
=== All-Big Ten honors ===
The following players were picked by the Associated Press (AP) and/or the United Press International (UPI) as first-team players on the 1959 All-Big Ten Conference football team.

| Position | Name | Team | Selectors |
|---|---|---|---|
| Quarterback | Dean Look | Michigan State | AP |
| Quarterback | Dale Hackbart | Wisconsin | UPI |
| Halfback | Bob Jeter | Iowa | AP, UPI |
| Halfback | Ron Burton | Northwestern | AP, UPI |
| Fullback | Mike Stock | Northwestern | AP, UPI |
| End | Jim Houston | Ohio State | AP, UPI |
| End | Don Norton | Iowa | AP, UPI |
| Tackle | Dan Lanphear | Wisconsin | AP, UPI |
| Tackle | Joe Rutgens | Illinois | AP |
| Tackle | Gene Gossage | Northwestern | UPI |
| Guard | Jerry Stalcup | Wisconsin | AP, UPI |
| Guard | Bill Burrell | Illinois | AP, UPI |
| Center | Jim Andreotti | Northwestern | AP, UPI |

=== All-American honors ===
At the end of the 1959 season, Big Ten players secured three of the 11 consensus first-team picks on the 1959 College Football All-America Team. The Big Ten's consensus All-Americans were:

| Position | Name | Team | Selectors |
|---|---|---|---|
| Tackle | Dan Lanphear | Wisconsin | AFCA, AP, FWAA, NEA, TSN, UPI, CP, Time, WCFF |
| Halfback | Ron Burton | Northwestern | AFCA, FWAA, NEA, TSN, UPI, CP, Time, WCFF |
| Guard | Bill Burrell | Illinois | AP, FWAA, UPI, CP, WCFF |

Other Big Ten players who were named first-team All-Americans by at least one selector were:

| Position | Name | Team | Selectors |
|---|---|---|---|
| End | Jim Houston | Ohio State | CP, Time |
| End | Don Norton | Iowa | FWAA |
| Center | Jim Andreotti | Northwestern | FWAA |
| Halfback | Dean Look | Michigan State | FWAA |
| Fullback | Bob White | Ohio State | Time |

=== Other awards ===
Four Big Ten players finished among the top 10 in the voting for the 1959 Heisman Trophy: offensive lineman Bill Burrell of Illinois (fourth); running back Dean Look of Michigan State (sixth); quarterback Dale Hackbart of Wisconsin (seventh); and running back Ron Burton of Wisconsin (10th).

== 1960 NFL draft ==
The following Big Ten players were among the first 100 picks in the 1960 NFL draft:

| Name | Position | Team | Round | Overall pick |
|---|---|---|---|---|
| Jim Houston | Defensive end | Ohio State | 1 | 8 |
| Ron Burton | Halfback | Northwestern | 1 | 9 |
| Bob Jeter | Halfback | Iowa | 2 | 17 |
| Curt Merz | End | Iowa | 3 | 31 |
| Ross Fichtner | Defensive back | Purdue | 3 | 33 |
| Jim Andreotti | Center | Northwestern | 4 | 39 |
| Billy Martin | Back | Minnesota | 4 | 43 |
| Jim Marshall | Tackle | Ohio State | 4 | 44 |
| Bill Burrell | Linebacker | Illinois | 5 | 50 |
| Dale Hackbart | Back | Wisconsin | 5 | 51 |
| Bob Jarus | Running back | Purdue | 5 | 53 |
| Don Norton | End | Iowa | 5 | 56 |
| Jerry Stalcup | Guard | Wisconsin | 6 | 62 |
| Mike Wright | Tackle | Minnesota | 6 | 65 |
| Leonard Wilson | Back | Purdue | 7 | 76 |
| Jerry Beabout | Tackle | Purdue | 7 | 82 |
| Dan Lanphear | Tackle | Wisconsin | 8 | 90 |
| Bob White | Back | Ohio State | 8 | 91 |
| Dewitt Hoopes | Tackle | Northwestern | 9 | 98 |
