= 1959 Michigan Wolverines football team =

American college football season

1959 Michigan Wolverines football
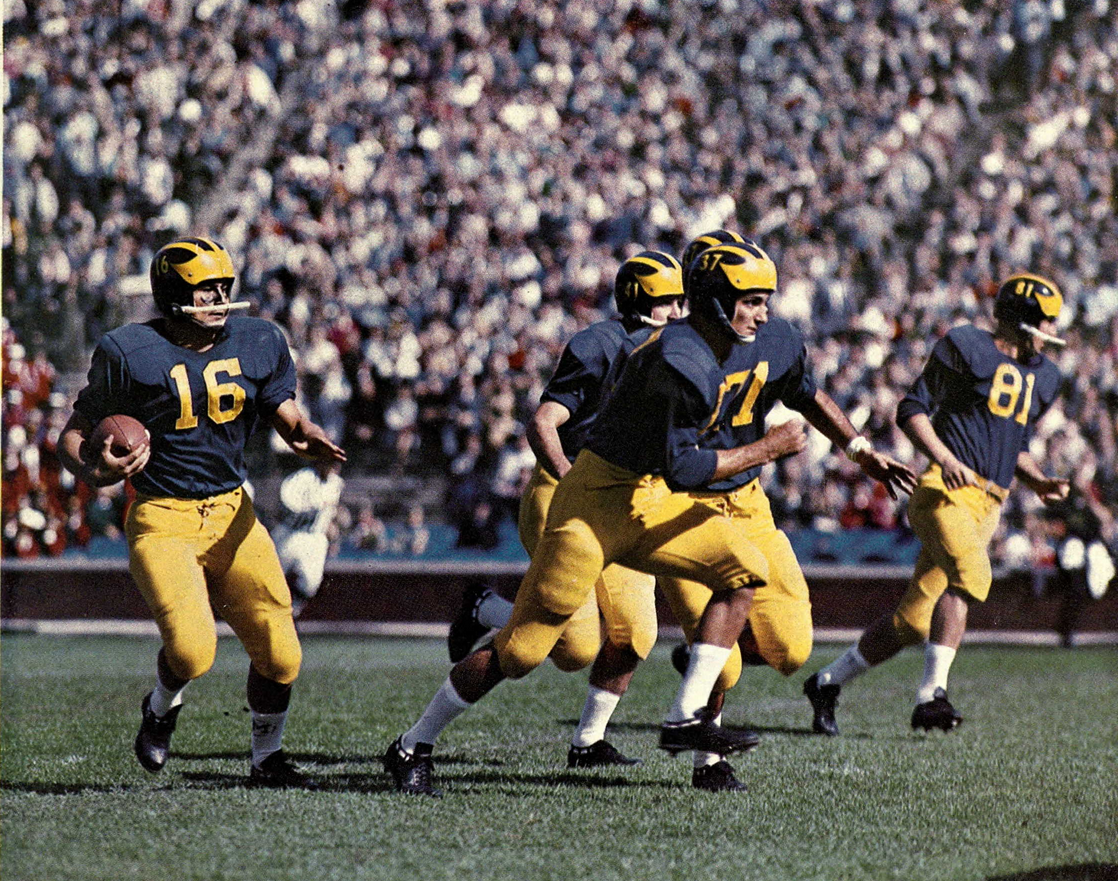
- Fred Julian (No. 16) carries the ball with Tony Rio (No. 37) blocking
- Conference: Big Ten Conference
- Record: 4–5 (3–4 Big Ten)
- Head coach: Bump Elliott (1st season)
- MVP: Tony Rio
- Captain: George Genyk
- Home stadium: Michigan Stadium

1959 Big Ten Conference football standings
	Conf.					Overall
Team	W		L		T	W		L		T
No. 6 Wisconsin $	5	–	2	–	0	7	–	3	–	0
Michigan State	4	–	2	–	0	5	–	4	–	0
Purdue	4	–	2	–	1	5	–	2	–	2
No. 13 Illinois	4	–	2	–	1	5	–	3	–	1
Northwestern	4	–	3	–	0	6	–	3	–	0
Iowa	3	–	3	–	0	5	–	4	–	0
Michigan	3	–	4	–	0	4	–	5	–	0
Indiana	2	–	4	–	1	4	–	4	–	1
Ohio State	2	–	4	–	1	3	–	5	–	1
Minnesota	1	–	6	–	0	2	–	7	–	0
$ – Conference champion; Rankings from AP Poll

The 1959 Michigan Wolverines football team was an American football team that represented the University of Michigan in the 1959 Big Ten Conference football season. In its first year under head coach Bump Elliott, Michigan compiled a 4–5 record (3–4 against conference opponents), finished in seventh place in the Big Ten, and was outscored by a combined total of 161 to 122.

After losing their first two games to Missouri and Michigan State, the Wolverines won four of their last seven games, including victories over Oregon State (18–7) and rivals Minnesota (14–6), and Ohio State (23–14).

No Michigan players received first-team honors on either the All-America or All-Big Ten teams. Left guard George Genyk was the team captain, and fullback Tony Rio received the team's most valuable player award. The team's statistical leaders included quarterback Stan Noskin with 747 passing yards, right halfback Fred Julian with 289 rushing yards, and right end Robert Johnson with 264 receiving yards.

== Schedule ==
Date	Opponent	Site	Result	Attendance	Source
September 26	Missouri*	Michigan Stadium; Ann Arbor, MI	L 15–20	50,533	
October 3	Michigan State	Michigan Stadium; Ann Arbor, MI (rivalry)	L 8–34	103,234	
October 10	Oregon State*	Michigan Stadium; Ann Arbor, MI	W 18–7	74,693	
October 17	No. 2 Northwestern	Michigan Stadium; Ann Arbor, MI (rivalry)	L 7–20	67,975	
October 24	at Minnesota	Memorial Stadium; Minneapolis, MN (Little Brown Jug)	W 14–6	57,354	
October 31	No. 10 Wisconsin^{†}	Michigan Stadium; Ann Arbor, MI	L 10–19	68,063	
November 7	at Illinois	Memorial Stadium; Champaign, IL (rivalry)	W 20–15	45,573	
November 14	at Indiana	Memorial Stadium; Bloomington, IN	L 7–26	24,171	
November 21	Ohio State	Michigan Stadium; Ann Arbor, MI (rivalry)	W 23–14	90,093	
*Non-conference game; ^{†}Homecoming; Rankings from AP Poll released prior to the game

== Season summary ==
=== Preseason ===
Late in the 1958 season, with the team on its way to a 2–6–1 record, head coach Bennie Oosterbaan resigned. In mid-November, the university announced that Bump Elliott, then an assistant on Oosterbaan's staff, would take over as head coach in 1959. Also at the end of the 1958 season, tackle George Genyk was elected as the captain of the 1959 team.

Elliott revamped the coaching staff after taking over. The only assistant coaches retained by Elliott were Bob Hollway and Don Dufek, Sr. New hires to the coaching staff were Jack Nelson, Henry Fonde, and Jack Fouts.

Charged with responsibility to "reverse a declining gridiron cycle", Elliott announced in the spring of 1959 that he intended to abandon Michigan's trademark single-wing formation in favor of the T formation he learned while on Forest Evashevski's staff at Iowa. To effectively run the T formation, Eliott acknowledged he would need an outstanding running quarterback.

In May 1959, tackle Willard Hildebrand was awarded the Meyer W. Morton trophy as the player showing the most improvement during spring practice. Coach Elliott credited Hildebrand for his desire, hustle, and willingness to work.

=== Missouri ===
Week 1: Missouri at Michigan

Team	1	2	3	4	Total
• Missouri	7	0	0	13	20
Michigan	0	0	6	9	15

- Date: October 10
- Location: Ann Arbor, MI
- Game attendance: 50,533

Scoring summary
1	MO	Mel West 46-yard run (Meher kick)	MO 7–0
3	MICH	Bennie McRae 44-yard pass from Stan Noskin (pass failed)	MO 7–6
4	MO	Pidcock 34-yard pass from Snowdon (Meher kick)	MO 14–6
4	MICH	McRae 10-yard run (pass failed)	MO 14–12
4	MICH	John Halstead 22-yard field goal	MICH 15–14
4	MO	Haas 1-yard run (run failed)	MO 28–15

On September 26, Michigan lost to Dan Devine's Missouri Tigers by a score of 20–15 before a crowd of 50,533 at Michigan Stadium. It was Bump Elliott's first game as Michigan's head coach. In the first quarter, Missouri took a 7–0 lead on a 46-yard touchdown run by Mel West. In the third quarter, Bennie McRae scored a Michigan touchdown on a 44-yard pass from Stan Noskin, but an attempted two-point conversion failed as Noskin was hit before he could pass the ball. Early in the fourth quarter, Missouri extended its lead to 14–6. Michigan rallied to take a 15–14 lead on a 10-yard touchdown run by McRae and a 22-yard field goal by John Halstead. With one minute to play, Missouri faced a fourth down at midfield. Under a heavy pass rush, Tigers quarterback Bobby Haas scrambled free for a first down. With less than 10 seconds remaining on the game clock, Haas carried again and scored from the one-yard line. Missouri went on to play in the 1960 Orange Bowl.

=== Michigan State ===
Week 2: Michigan State at Michigan

Team	1	2	3	4	Total
• Michigan State	14	13	7	0	34
Michigan	0	0	0	8	8

- Date: October 3
- Location: Ann Arbor, MI
- Game attendance: 103,234

Scoring summary
1	MSU	Herb Adderley 2-yard run (Art Brandstatter kick)	MSU 7–0
1	MSU	Blanche Martin 1-yard run (Brandstatter kick)	MSU 14–0
2	MSU	Dean Look 2-yard run (kick failed)	MSU 20–0
2	MSU	Bob Suci 94-yard pass interception return (Brandstatter kick)	MSU 27–0
3	MSU	Don Stewart 25-yard pass from Look (Brandstatter kick)	MSU 34–0
4	MICH	Stan Noskin 1-yard run (Johnson pass from Noskin)	MSU 34–8

On October 3, Michigan lost to Duffy Daugherty's Michigan State Spartans by a 34–8 score before a record crowd of 103,234 at Michigan Stadium. The Spartans took a 27–0 lead at halftime on short touchdown runs by Herb Adderley, Blanche Martin, and Dean Look, and a 94-yard interception and return by Bob Suci. The Spartans extended their lead in the third quarter on a touchdown pass from Look to Don Stewart. Michigan scored in the fourth quarter on a one-yard run by quarterback Stan Noskin. The Spartans out-gained the Wolverines by a total of 342 yards to 158 yards.

=== Oregon State ===
Week 3: Oregon State at Michigan

Team	1	2	3	4	Total
Oregon State	0	0	7	0	7
• Michigan	3	0	0	15	18

- Date: October 10
- Location: Ann Arbor, MI
- Game attendance: 74,693

Scoring summary
1	MICH	John Halstead 27-yard field goal)	MICH 3–0
3	OSC	Jim Stinnette 1-yard run (Aaron Thomas kick)	OSC 7–3
4	MICH	Kenneth Tureaud 1-yard run (Dennis Fitzgerald pass from Stan Noskin)	MICH 11–7
4	MICH	Darrell Harper 2-yard run (Halstead kick)	MICH 18–7

On October 10, Michigan defeated Tommy Prothro's Oregon State Beavers by an 18 to 7 score before a crowd of 74,693 at Michigan Stadium in Ann Arbor. The Band Day crowd included 13,500 high school band players. It was the team's first victory under new head coach Bump Elliott. The victory also broke a six-game losing streak and avoided setting a new school record with a seventh consecutive loss.

Michigan took a 3–0 lead in the first quarter on a 27-yard field goal by John Halstead. Shortly before halftime, Michigan drove to Oregon State's four-yard line, but turned the ball over on a fumble. Oregon State took the lead in the third quarter when Chuck Marshall intercepted a Don Hannah pass on the Beavers' three-yard line and returned it 75 yards to Michigan's 22-yard line. After moving the ball to the one-yard line, Jim Stinnette dove over for the go-ahead touchdown. At the end of the game, Michigan players carried coach Elliott off the field on their shoulders.

Michigan trailed, 7–3, at the start of the fourth quarter but rallied in the final eight minutes. John Halstead began the comeback when he recovered a fumble at the Oregon State 33-yard line. Ken Tureaud ran the final yard for the game-winning touchdown with 7:44 remaining. The Wolverines then ran a trick play on the extra point attempt; Stan Noskin took the snap as the holder, then passed to Dennis Fitzgerald in the end zone for two points. Oregon State moved into Michigan territory on the next drive, but Reid Bushong intercepted an Oregon State pass at Michigan's 20-yard line to stop the drive. The Wolverines then mounted a long drive, aided by a personal foul penalty, ending with a two-yard touchdown run by Darrell Harper with 2:40 remaining in the game.

Michigan out-gained Oregon State by a total of 332 yard (252 rushing, 80 passing) to 152 yards (68 rushing, 84 passing).

=== Northwestern ===
Week 4: Northwestern at Michigan

Team	1	2	3	4	Total
• Northwestern	7	7	0	6	20
Michigan	7	0	0	0	7

- Date: October 17
- Location: Ann Arbor, MI
- Game attendance: 67,975

Scoring summary
1	MICH	Kenneth Tureaud 6-yard run (Darrell Harper kick)	MICH 7–0
1	NW	Mike Stock 4-yard run (Stock kick)	TIE 7–7
2	NW	Mark Johnston 63-yard pass from John Talley (Stock kick)	NW 14–7
4	NW	Ray Purdin 85-yard run (kick failed)	NW 20–7

On October 17, Michigan lost to Ara Parseghian's Northwestern Wildcats before a crowd of 67,975 at Michigan Stadium. Northwestern was ranked No. 2 prior to the game, having defeated No. 2 Oklahoma in its opening game.

Michigan dominated the game early. In the first 10 minutes, the Wolverines drove downfield only to lose the ball on a fumble in the end zone, recovered a fumbled snap on Northwestern's six-yard line, and took a 7–0 lead on a six-yard run by Kenneth Tureaud. The Wolverines were held scoreless in the game's final 50 minutes. Michigan kept the game close by recovering five of six Northwestern fumbles. The Wolverines' offense was stopped at Northwestern's goal line on three drives and also missed a field goal when stopped at the 16-yard line.

Northwestern's attack was led by Mark Johnston and Ron Purdin. Johnston played all 60 minutes, gaining 95 rushing yards and 86 receiving yards (including a 63-yard touchdown reception in the final minute of the first half). Purdin played 58 minutes, gaining 117 yards on 10 carries and another 35 yards on a pass reception. Purdin's 85-yard touchdown run in the fourth quarter was the longest running play for Northwestern since the 1921 season. The Wildcats out-gained the Wolverines by a total of 410 yards to 196 yards.

=== Minnesota ===
Week 5: Michigan at Minnesota

Team	1	2	3	4	Total
• Michigan	0	0	14	0	14
Minnesota	0	0	0	6	6

- Date: October 24
- Location: Minneapolis, MN
- Game attendance: 57,534

Scoring summary
3	12:29	MICH	Darrell Harper 83-yard punt return (Harper kick)	MICH 7–0
3	10:24	MICH	Fred Julian 42-yard run (Halstead kick)	MICH 14–0
4	1:14	MINN	Tom Hall 16-yard pass from Dick Johnson (pass failed)	MICH 14–6

On October 24, Michigan defeated Minnesota by a 14–6 score in the annual Little Brown Jug game before a crowd of 57,534 at Memorial Stadium in Minneapolis. It was Michigan's first conference victory of the 1959 season and its first road victory since 1957.

After a scoreless first half, Michigan stopped Minnesota on the opening drive of the second half. Darrell Harper returned the ensuing punt 83 yards for a touchdown at the 12:29 mark of the third quarter. Harper kicked the extra point following his long run, and Michigan led, 7–0. After the kickoff, Minnesota fumbled on its third play, and Michigan end John Halstead fell on the loose ball at Minnesota's 43-yard line. It was Halstead's sixth fumble recovery of the 1959 season. On the next play, right halfback Fred Julian carried the ball 43 yards for Michigan's second touchdown at the 10:24 mark of the third quarter. It was Julian's first collegiate touchdown. At the end of the third quarter, Minnesota drove to Michigan's seven-yard line, but Minnesota fumbled on fourth down. On the Gophers' next two possessions, the Gophers drove to Michigan's 23- and 20-yard lines but were unable to score. Finally, with 1:14 remaining in the game, Minnesota averted a shutout as backup quarterback Dick Johnson threw a 14-yard touchdown pass to Tom Hall.

Minnesota out-gained Michigan by a total of 371 yards to 186 yards. Julian led Michigan's attack with 93 rushing yards on eight carries, including runs of 25 and 43 yards. Quarterback Stan Noskin completed five of nine passes for 80 yards, including a 43-yard connection with Bennie McRae.

=== Wisconsin ===
Week 6: Wisconsin at Michigan

Team	1	2	3	4	Total
• Wisconsin	8	8	0	3	19
Michigan	3	0	0	7	10

- Date: October 31
- Location: Ann Arbor, MI
- Game attendance: 68,063

Scoring summary
1	MICH	Darrell Harper 34-yard field goal	MICH 3–0
1	WISC	Tom Wiesner 5-yard run (Dale Hackbart run)	WISC 8–3
2	WISC	Hackbart 1-yard run (Hackbart run)	WISC 16–3
4	MICH	John Halstead 3-yard pass from Stan Noskin (Harper kick)	WISC 16–10
4	WISC	Holzwarth 29-yard field goal)	WISC 19–10

On October 31, Michigan lost to Wisconsin, ranked No. 10 in the country, by a 19–10 score before a homecoming crowd of 68,063 on a gray, foggy day at Michigan Stadium. It was the first time a Wisconsin football team had beaten Michigan since 1934.

In a bad day for the quarterbacks, the teams attempted 21 passes, completed only six, and combined for nine interceptions. Michigan threw six of the nine interceptions (five by Stan Noskin), one short of the Big Ten single-game record. The interceptions led to two Wisconsin touchdowns and a field goal.

=== Illinois ===
Week 7: Michigan at Illinois

Team	1	2	3	4	Total
• Michigan	0	6	7	7	20
Illinois	9	0	0	6	15

- Date: November 7
- Location: Champaign, IL
- Game attendance: 45,573

Scoring summary
1	ILL	Gerald Wood (36-yard field goal	ILL 3–0
1	ILL	Johnny Counts 37-yard run (run failed)	ILL 9–0
2	MICH	Tony Rio 13-yard pass from Stan Noskin (run failed)	ILL 9–6
3	MICH	Darrell Harper 7-yard run (Harper kick)	MICH 13–9
4	MICH	Fred Julian 1-yard run (Harper kick)	MICH 20–9
4	ILL	Bill Brown 3-yard run (pass failed)	MICH 20–15

On November 7, Michigan defeated Illinois by a 20–15 score at Champaign, Illinois. The victory snapped Michigan's four-game losing streak at Champaign which included losses in 1951, 1953, 1955, and 1957. The victory crushed Illinois' bid for a Big Ten championship and trip to the Rose Bowl.

Illinois took a 9–0 lead in the opening nine minutes of the game. On the second play of the game, Darrell Harper fumbled at Michigan's 28-yard line, setting up an Illinois field goal. On Michigan's next possession, John Stamos threw an interception, and John Counts then ran 27 yards for a touchdown. The Wolverines came back with touchdowns in each of the other three quarters. Tony Rio scored with 64 seconds remaining in the first half on a diving catch in the end zone after a pass from Stan Noskin was deflected. Noskin's run for two-point conversion failed. Early in the third quarter, Gerry Smith intercepted a pass and returned the ball to the Illini 26-yard line. Darrell Harper then scored on a seven-yard run. In the fourth quarter, Alex Callahan intercepted another Illini pass and returned it 43 yards to the Illinois 28-yard line. Fred Julian scored on a one-yard run. Michigan was out-gained by totals of 232 yards to 181 yards, but Illinois turnovers (four interceptions, including three by Gerry Smith) enabled Michigan to prevail.

=== Indiana ===
Week 8: Michigan at Indiana

Team	1	2	3	4	Total
Michigan	0	7	0	0	7
• Indiana	13	6	0	7	26

- Date: November 14
- Location: Bloomington, IN
- Game attendance: 24,171

Scoring summary
1	IND	Ted Smith 6-yard run (Miller kick)	IND 7–0
1	IND	Bradford 7-yard run (kick failed)	IND 13–0
2	MICH	John Halstead 25-yard pass from Noskin (Halstead kick)	IND 13–7
2	IND	Don Cromer 1-yard run (pass failed)	IND 19–7
4	IND	Aucreman 14-yard pass from Smith (Miller kick)	IND 26–7

On November 14, Michigan lost to Indiana by a 26–7 score before a crowd of 24,171 at Bloomington, Indiana. Michigan turned the ball over eight times, four times on fumbles and four times on interceptions. Indiana scored on short drives following three of the turnovers. The Wolverines out-gained the Hoosiers by a total of 259 yards to 218 yards. Michigan right end Bob Johnson caught six passes for 80 yards. Coach Bump Elliott blamed the weather, which prevented the Wolverines from flying and required them to ride buses for eight hours.

=== Ohio State ===
Week 9: Ohio State at Michigan

Team	1	2	3	4	Total
Ohio State	6	0	8	0	14
• Michigan	7	7	6	3	23

- Date: November 21
- Location: Ann Arbor, MI
- Game attendance: 90,093

Scoring summary
1	MICH	Tony Rio 8-yard pass from Stan Noskin (Darrell Harper kick)	MICH 7–0
1	OHIO	Jim Houston 1-yard pass from Jerry Fields (kick failed)	MICH 7–6
2	MICH	Noskin 1-yard run (Harper kick)	MICH 14–6
3	OHIO	Roger Detrich 1-yard pass from Fields (Jim Herbstreit pass from Field)	TIE 14–14
3	MICH	Rio 1-yard run (kick failed)	MICH 20–14
4	MICH	Harper 29-yard field goal	MICH 23–14

On November 21, Michigan concluded its first season under Bump Elliott with a 23–14 victory over Woody Hayes' Ohio State Buckeyes. The game was played in "freezing, sunless weather" before a crowd of 90,093 at Michigan Stadium.

It was the final game for seniors Stan Noskin, Tony Rio, Darrell Harper, and Fred Julian who were responsible for all 23 points scored by the Wolverines. Fullback Rio carried only six times for 18 yards but scored two touchdowns. Quarterback Noskin completed seven of ten passes for 88 yards (including a touchdown pass to Rio) and also rushed for a touchdown. Left halfback Harper kicked two extra points and a field goal and also led the rushing attack with 58 yards on 11 carries, while right halfback Julian added 54 rushing yards on 12 carries.

Michigan's first touchdown followed a turnover when Ohio State fumbled the opening kickoff at its own 20-yard line. The fumble was caused by a hard tackle from Michigan's John Halstead who was carried unconscious from the field and taken to University Hospital.

The Wolverines prevailed despite being out-gained by 358 yards to 306 yards. The Wolverines' 23 points and 306 yards were both season highs. Backup fullback Roger Detrick led the Buckeyes with 139 rushing yards on 33 carries. Michigan's defense halted four Ohio State scoring drives, intercepted two passes (one each by Todd Grant and Reid Bushong), and Reid Bushong recovered a fumble.

Woody Hayes drew attention for his angry reactions on the sideline. One writer compared him to a "hot stripper" as he shed and hurled articles of clothing including his long-billed baseball cap, brown jacket, and necktie. His jacket was hurled after being whirled over his head and then retrieved by a staffer, only to be hurled again as Hayes "flailed his arms around like a windmill caught in a tornado." He next attacked a wooden folding chair and drop-kicked it a half-dozen yards. Hayes' antics triggered "a great chortling cheer from the fans."

=== Postseason ===
After the season, fullback Tony Rio was selected as the team's most valuable player. No Michigan players were named by the Associated Press (AP) or United Press (UP) to the first or second squads on the 1959 All-Big Ten Conference football team. Center Gerry Smith was named to the AP third team, and George Genyk and Bennie McRae received honorable mention.

== Statistical leaders ==
Michigan's individual statistical leaders for the 1959 season include those listed below.

=== Rushing ===
Player	Attempts	Net yards	Yards per attempt	Touchdowns
Fred Julian	72	289	4.0	2
Bennie McRae	76	242	3.2	1
Darrell Harper	67	224	3.3	2
Tony Rio	56	222	4.0	
Ken Tureaud	27	104	3.9	
Dennis Fitzgerald	16	55	3.4	

=== Passing ===
Player	Attempts	Completions	Interceptions	Comp %	Yards	Yds/Comp	TD	Long
Stan Noskin	115	61	15	53.0	697	11.4	5	46
John Stamos	9	2	4	22.3	35	17.5	0	--

=== Receiving ===
Player	Receptions	Yards	Yds/Recp	TD	Long
Robert Johnson	20	264	13.2	0	20
Bennie McRae	4	102	25.5	1	46
Tony Rio	8	90	11.3	2	26
John Halstead	6	77	12.8		
Ken Tureaud	6	60	10.0		

=== Kickoff returns ===
Player	Returns	Yards	Yds/Return	TD	Long
Bennie McRae	7	148	21.1	0	30
Fred Julian	5	90	18.0	0	21
Darrell Harper	4	62	15.5	0	22

=== Punt returns ===
Player	Returns	Yards	Yds/Return	TD	Long
Darrell Harper	3	101	33.7	1	83
Reid Bushong	4	62	15.5	0	21
Jim Raeder	3	38	12.7	0	25

== Personnel ==
=== Coaching staff ===
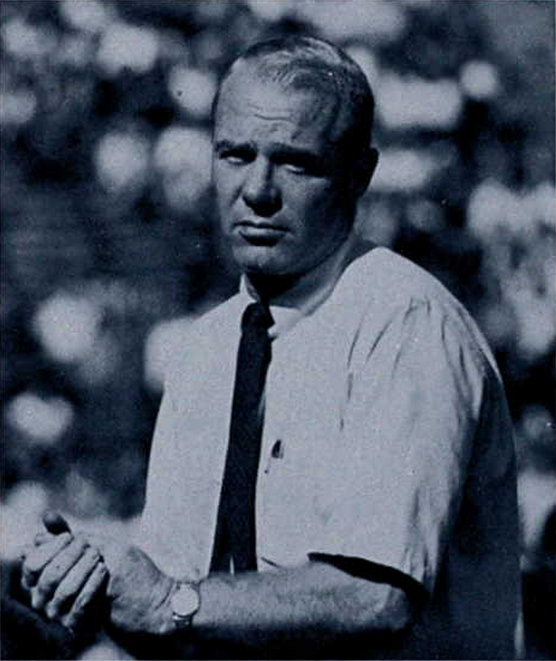
Head coach Bump Elliott

- Head coach: Bump Elliott
- Assistant coaches:

- Don Dufek, Sr. - freshman coach
- Henry Fonde - backfield coach
- Jack Fouts - assistant line coach
- Bob Hollway - line coach
- Jack Nelson - ends coach

- Trainer: Jim Hunt
- Head manager: John Jabe Jr.

=== Players ===
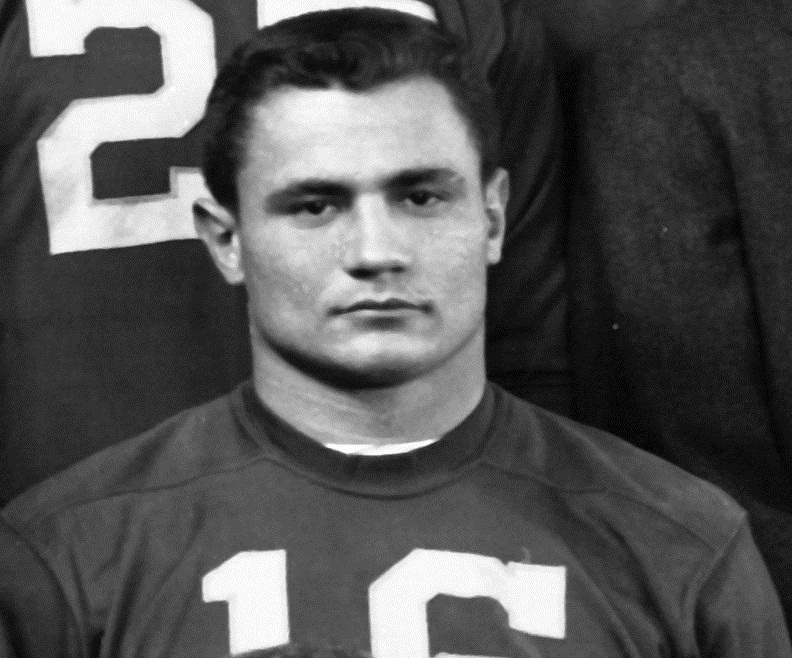
Fred Julian

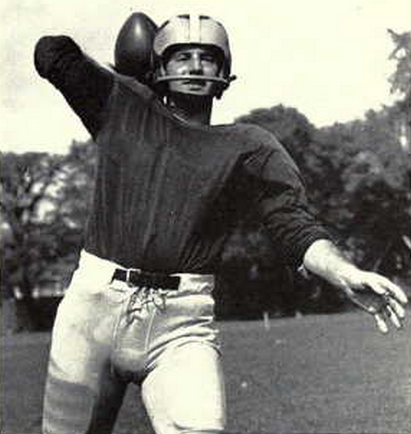
Stan Noskin

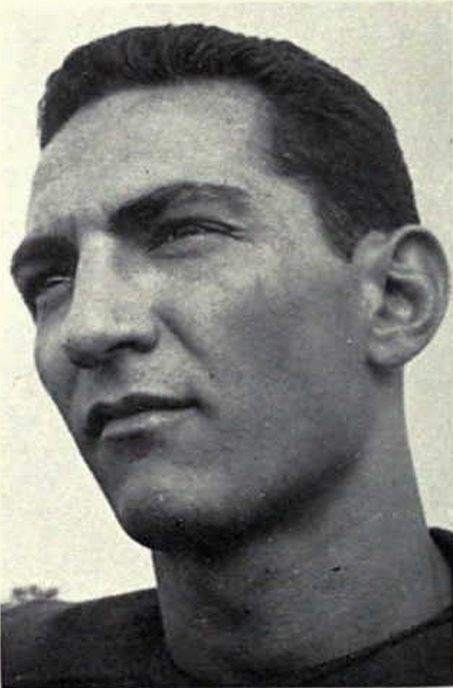
Tony Rio

==== Starting backfield ====
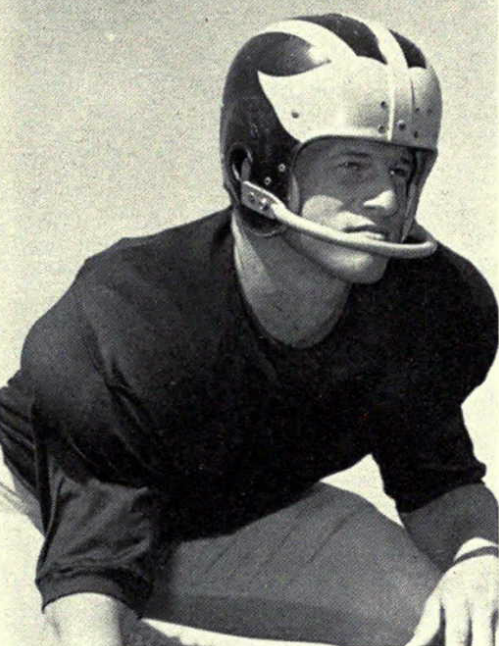
George Genyk

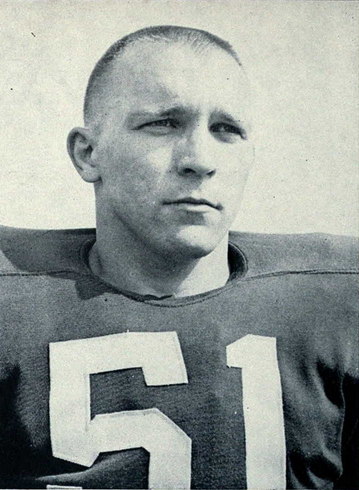
Gerald Smith

The following backfield players started at least one game for Michigan during the 1959 season.

- Darrell Harper, 6'1", 194 pounds, senior, Royal Oak, MI - started 9 games at left halfback
- Fred Julian, 5'9", 188 pounds, senior, Detroit - started 7 games at right halfback
- Brad Myers, 6'0", 197 pounds, senior, Evanston, IL - started 2 games at right halfback
- Stan Noskin, 5'11", 180 pounds, Chicago - started 9 games at quarterback
- Tony Rio, 6'0", 182 pounds, senior, Chicago - started 9 games at fullback

==== Starting linemen ====
The following linemen started at least one game for Michigan during the 1959 season.

- Jared Bushong, 6'2", 204 pounds, senior, Toledo, OH - started 5 games at right tackle
- Alex Callahan, 6'0", 193 pounds, senior, Wyandotte, MI - started 8 games at right guard
- Donald R. Deskins, 6'2", 238 pounds, senior, Jamaica, NY - started 2 games at right tackle
- Mike Fillichio, 5'10", 195 pounds, senior, River Forest, IL - started 1 game at left guard, 1 games at right guard
- George Genyk, 6'0", 196 pounds, senior, Detroit - started 8 games at left guard
- John Halstead, 6'2", 208 pounds, junior, Bay City, MI - started 9 games at left end
- Willard "Skip" Hildebrand, 6'2", 210 pounds, junior, Chillicothe, OH - started 1 game at right tackle
- Thomas Jobson, 6'0", 210 pounds, junior, Flint, MI - started 9 games at left tackle
- Robert Johnson, 6'2", 206 pounds, senior, Chicago - started 9 games at right end
- Jon Schopf, 6'2", 218 pounds, sophomore, Grand Rapids, MI - started 2 games at right tackle
- Gerry Smith, 5'10", 187 pounds, senior, Detroit - started 9 games at center

==== Other letter winners ====
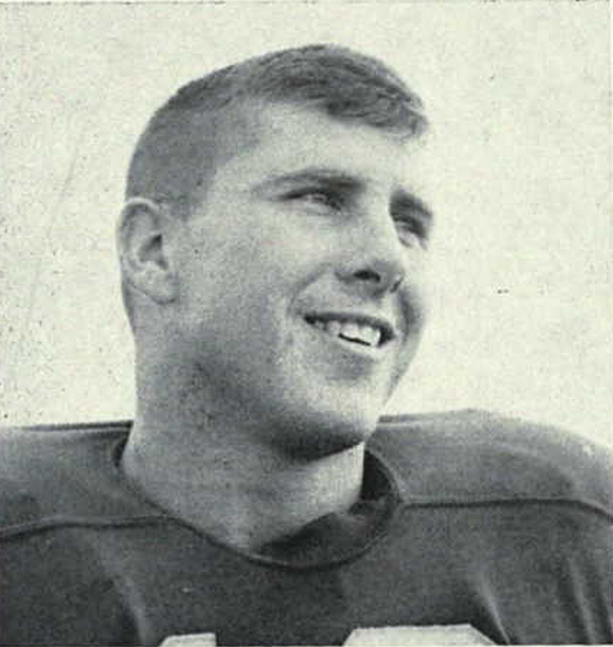
Dennis Fitzgerald

In addition to the 16 starters referenced above, the following additional individuals received varsity letters:

- Reid Bushong, 6'1", 178 pounds, junior, Toledo, OH - halfback
- Keith Cowan, 6'2", 205 pounds, junior, Cleveland - end
- Guy Curtis, 6'1", 215 pounds, junior, South Bend, IN - tackle
- Dennis Fitzgerald, 5'10", 180 pounds, junior, Ann Arbor, MI - halfback
- Todd Grant, 6'4", 222 pounds, sophomore, Lathrup Village, MI - center
- Lee Hall, 6'0", 212 pounds, sophomore, Charlotte, MI - guard
- Don Hannah, 6'0", 180 pounds, junior, Gary, IN - quarterback
- Gary Kane, 6'3", 215 pounds, junior, Elgin, IL - end
- James Korowin, 6'2", 195 pounds, sophomore, Wyandotte, MI - end
- Jerry Leith, 5'7", 168 pounds, senior, Ann Arbor, MI - halfback
- Scott Maentz, 6'3", 206 pounds, sophomore, East Grand Rapids, MI - end
- George Mans, 6'4", 202 pounds, sophomore, Trenton, MI - end
- Gary McNitt, 5'10", 195 pounds, junior, Mesick, MI - halfback
- James McPherson, 5'10", 175 pounds, senior, Herrin, IL - quarterback
- Bennie McRae, 6'0", 168 pounds, sophomore, Newport News, VA - halfback
- Harry Newman Jr., 5'10", 188 pounds, junior, Franklin, MI - halfback
- Paul Palmer, 5'10", 170 pounds, sophomore, Toronto - quarterback
- Lou Pavloff, 6'0", 195 pounds, sophomore, Hazel Park, MI - guard
- Paul Poulos, 5'11", 196 pounds, junior, Freedom, PA - guard
- J. Paul Raeder, 5'11", 193 pounds, senior, Lorain, OH - fullback
- John Stamos, 6'1", 204 pounds, sophomore, Chicago - quarterback
- Stephen Stieler, center, 5'9", 201 pounds, sophomore, Wyandotte, MI - center
- William R. Stine, 6'2", 211 pounds, junior, Toledo, OH - tackle
- Bill Tunnicliff, 6'1", 208 pounds, sophomore, Ferndale, MI - fullback
- Kenneth Tureaud, 6'1", 198 pounds, sophomore, Detroit - fullback
- Rudd Van Dyne, 6'0", 193 pounds, junior, Sedalia, MO - halfback
- Jim Zubkus, 6'1", 190 pounds, sophomore, Munhall, PA - end

==== Reserve players ====
In addition, the following 25 players received "reserve" awards for their participation on the team:

- Bruce Boardman, Grosse Pointe, MI - fullback
- Guy DeStefano, 5'11", 185 pounds, sophomore, Gary, IN - fullback
- Dick Diehl, 6'2", 200 pounds, senior, Erie, PA - tackle
- Bill Dougall, 6'0", 180 pounds, sophomore, Detroit - quarterback
- Wilbert Franklin, 5'10", 182 pounds, sophomore, Chicago - halfback
- Tom Gee, 5'10", 196 pounds, junior, Melvindale, MI - guard
- Wally Herrala, 5'10", 220 pounds, sophomore, Muskegon Heights, MI - guard
- Bill Hornbeck, 6'2", 180 pounds, junior, Los Angeles - end
- Tom Kerr, 6'1", 193 pounds, freshman, Hobart, IN -
- Frank Maloney, 5'11", 194 pounds, sophomore, Chicago - center
- John Mans, 6'4", 202 pounds, sophomore, Trenton, MI - center
- Grant McKee, 6'0", 187 pounds, sophomore, North Bay, Ontario - halfback
- Dave Palomaki, 6'1", 205 pounds, junior, Ishpeming, MI - tackle
- Virgil Pampu, 6'0", 190 pounds, sophomore, Dearborn, MI - center
- Ron Perry, 6'0", 217 pounds, sophomore, Vineland, NJ - tackle
- Paul Schmidt, 6'4", 230 pounds, sophomore, Skokie, IL - tackle
- David Slezak, 5'11", 178 pounds, sophomore, Ann Arbor, MI - guard
- Jeff Smith, 6'3", 190 pounds, sophomore, Kohler, WI - end
- Dan Snow, 5'11", 180 pounds, sophomore, Hamtramck, MI - center
- Ran Spacht, 5'10", 180 pounds, sophomore, Kent, OH - halfback
- Nick Spewock, 6'0", 215 pounds, sophomore, Dearborn, MI - guard
- Willard Stawski, 6'3", 210 pounds, sophomore, Caledonia, MI - tackle
- Dave Thomas, 6'2", 200 pounds, sophomore, Norwalk, OH - guard
- Grant Walls, 6'0", 200 pounds, junior, Norwalk, OH - tackle
- Pete Wooding, 5'10", 170 pounds, sophomore, Ann Arbor, MI - halfback

==== Freshmen squad ====
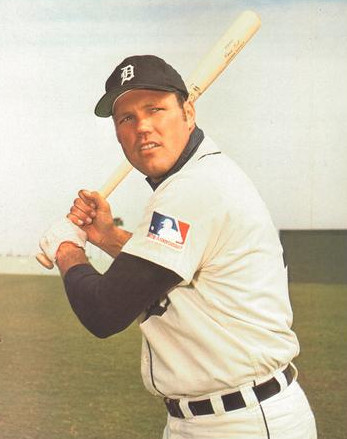
Bill Freehan with Detroit Tigers

The following notable freshman were also part of the program:

- Bob Chandler, 6'2", 190 pounds, La Grange, IL - quarterback
- Bill Freehan, 6'1", 200 pounds, Royal Oak, MI - halfback
- Dave Glinka, 5'11", 195 pounds, Toledo, OH - quarterback
- Joe O'Donnell, 6'2", 210 pounds, Milan, MI
- Dave Raimey, 5'11", 185 pounds, Dayton, OH - halfback

== Awards and honors ==
Team honors and awards for the 1959 season went to the following individuals.

- Captain: George Genyk
- Most Valuable Player: Tony Rio
- Meyer Morton Award: Willard Hildebrand
- John Maulbetsch Award: Bob Brown
