= Henyk =

Henyk (Ukrainian: Геник, Ґеник) is a Ukrainian-language surname. The spelling "Ґеник" is transliterated as Genyk. Primarily people with this last name live in West Ukraine, specifically Ivano-Frankivsk Oblast. Notable people with this surname include:

- Anna Henyk, first wife of Yaroslav Halan
- Cyril Genik (1857–1925), Ukrainian-Canadian immigration agent, a Person of National Historic Significance in Canada
- George Genyk (1938–2017), American football lineman and coach
- Jeff Genyk (born 1960), American football coach and former player, son of George
