= Fred Julian =

American football player and coach (1938–2013)

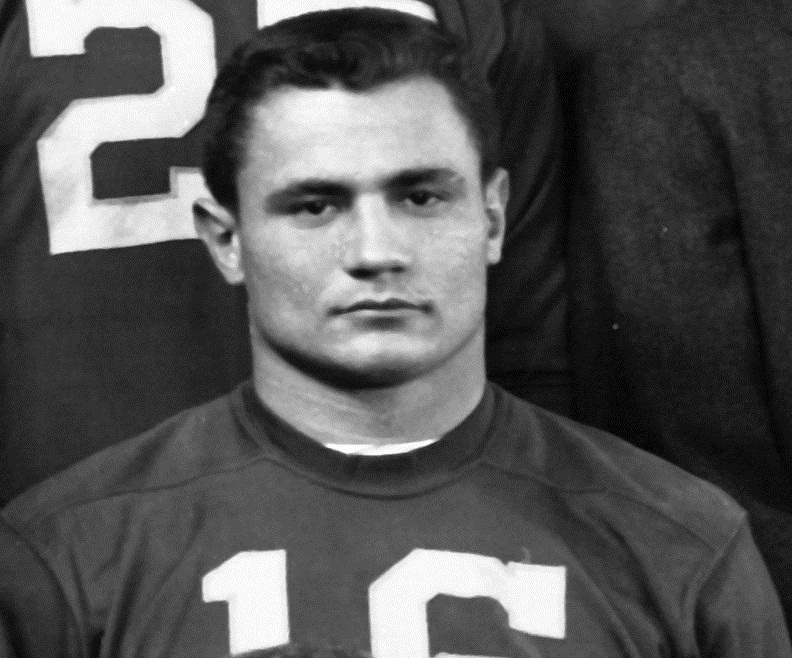
- Julian from 1958 Michigan team portrait

No. 16, 39
- Position: Defensive back

Personal information
- Born: January 27, 1938; Detroit, Michigan, U.S.
- Died: May 4, 2013 (aged 75); Comstock Park, Michigan, U.S.
- Listed height: 5 ft 9 in (1.75 m)
- Listed weight: 185 lb (84 kg)

Career information
- High school: Pershing (Detroit, Michigan)
- College: Michigan

Career history

Playing
- New York Titans (1960)

Coaching
- West Catholic HS (MI) (1969–1984) (head coach); Grand Rapids (1985–2002) (head coach)
- Stats at Pro Football Reference

Alfred J. Julian Jr. (January 27, 1938 – May 4, 2013) was an American football player and coach. He was a starting defensive back for the New York Titans (renamed the Jets in 1963) during their inaugural 1960 season and led the team with six interceptions in 14 games. He played college football for the University of Michigan from 1957 to 1959 and was the leading rusher on the 1959 Michigan team.

Julian was the head football coach at Grand Rapids Community College for 18 years from 1985 to 2002. He led the team to a 139–48–2 record and has been inducted into the NJCAA Football Coaches Association Hall of Fame. He also coached high school football at West Catholic High School in Grand Rapids, Michigan for 16 years.

== Early life ==
Julian grew up in Detroit, Michigan, and attended Pershing High School. He was the son Alfred J. Julian Sr. and Rosa Julian, both of whom were Michigan natives. Julian had two siblings, Norma and Dennis. His father was employed as a "trimmer" in an automobile factory when Julian was a boy. His grandfather, Wilbrod Julian, and his uncle, William Julian, also worked as "machinists" in a Detroit automobile factory.

== Michigan ==
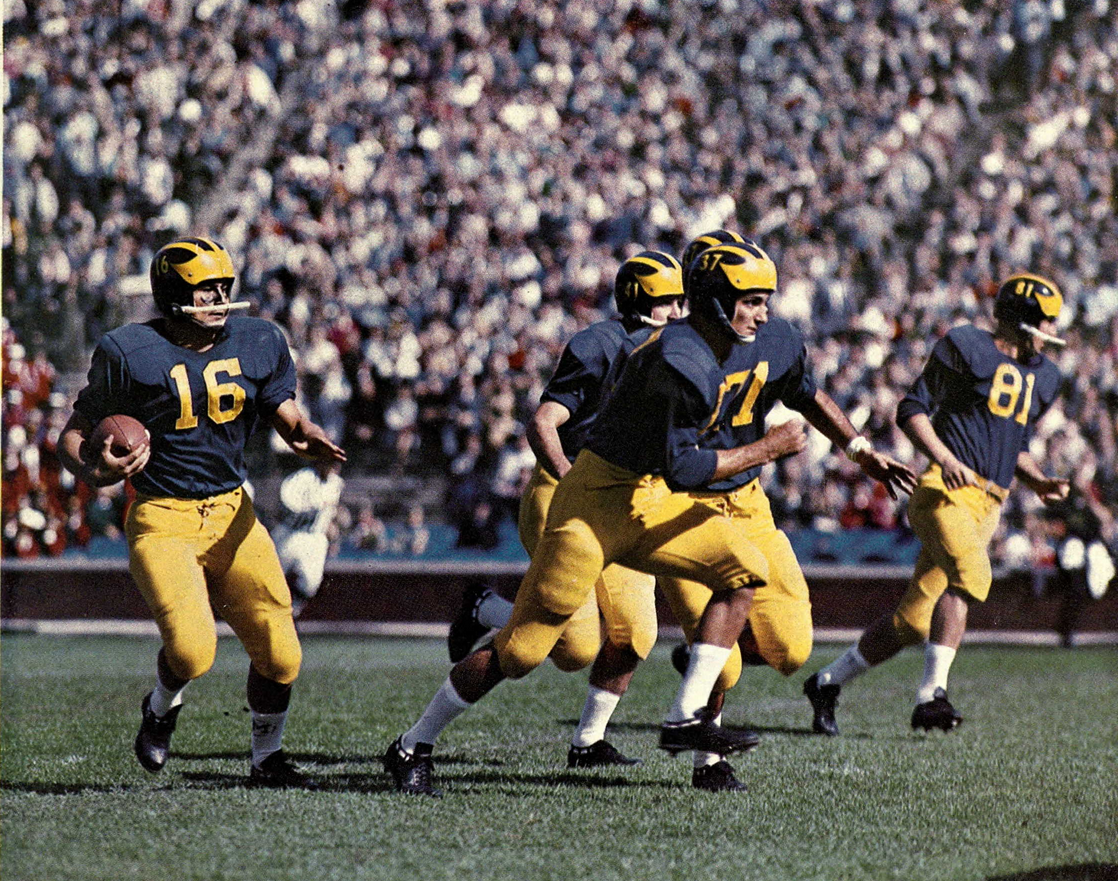
Julian carrying the ball, 1959

Julian attended the University of Michigan played for the Michigan Wolverines football team from 1957 to 1959. As a junior, Julian started all nine games at right halfback on both offense and defense for the 1958 Michigan Wolverines football team. The 1958 team finished in eighth place in the Big Ten Conference with a disappointing 2–6–1 record. Julian rushed for 180 yards on 45 carries in 1958.

Michigan head coach Bennie Oosterbaan was fired after the 1958 season and replaced with Bump Elliott. Under the new head coach, the 1959 Wolverines improved marginally to seventh place in the Big Ten and a 4–5 record. Julian was the starting right halfback in seven of Michigan's nine games in 1959, rushing for 289 yards on 72 carries. On October 24, 1959, he gained a career-high 93 yards, including a 42-yard touchdown run, in a 14–6 victory over Minnesota. He also scored the winning touchdown on a one-yard run in a 20-15 upset victory over Illinois on November 7, 1959. Julian was Michigan's leading rusher in 1959, and his total of 289 yards remains the lowest in school history for a player who led the team in rushing.

== Professional football ==
Julian was not drafted in the 1960 NFL draft. Michigan head coach Bump Elliott arranged for Julian to get a tryout with the New York Titans (renamed the Jets in 1963) in the newly formed American Football League. He tried out for the team at the Polo Grounds on July 7, 1960, and the Titans' head coach Sammy Baugh was reportedly impressed by Julian's "ability at one-to-one coverage."

Julian made the team and played appeared in all 14 games as a defensive back in the Titans' inaugural season. He led the team (and finished fourth in the league) with six pass interceptions. After a 27–7 victory over the Los Angeles Chargers, Titans general manager Steve Sebo singled out Julian as "the best defensive back on the field." Julian later recalled that he learned a tremendous amount about football from watching and listening to Sammy Baugh.

Prior to training camp in 1961, Julian learned he was likely to be drafted by the military. According to William Ryczek's history of the New York Jets, Julian was a starter for the Titans in all of their pre-season games, but the team released him before the start of the regular season due to his imminent induction into the military. He tried out with the Boston Patriots but was rejected for the same reason.

In the end, Julian was not drafted in the military. He returned to Michigan where he coached high school football and played in the newly formed World Football League for the team in Grand Rapids.

== Coaching career ==
After retiring as a football player, Julian worked in Detroit as an insurance agent during the 1960s.

In 1969, Julian returned to Grand Rapids and became the head football coach at West Catholic High School. He was the head football coach at West Catholic for 16 years.

In 1985, he took over as the head football coach at Grand Rapids Community College (GRCC), succeeding Gordon Hunsberger, who had been the head coach since the 1950s. He remained as the coach at GRCC for 18 years from 1985 to 2002, compiling a record of 139–48–2. He led GRCC to the 1988 national championship game and appearances in seven bowl games, including the 1986 Texas Junior College Shrine Bowl, 1987 East Bowl, the 1988 Valley of the Sun Bowl (National Championship Game), the 1990 Mickinnon Travel Midwest Bowl, the 1992 Dixie Rotary Bowl, the 1996 Dixie Rotary Bowl, and the 2002 Graphic Edge/Siglar Printing Bowl.

Julian retired after the 2002 season In 2003, he was inducted into the National Junior College Athletic Association Football Coaches Association Hall of Fame.

== Family ==
Julian was married to Joycelin A. Julian. They had four children. Julian's wife died in 2008, and he died in May 2013 in Comstock Park, Michigan, where he lived, at age 75.
