= Stan Noskin =

American football player (born 1938)

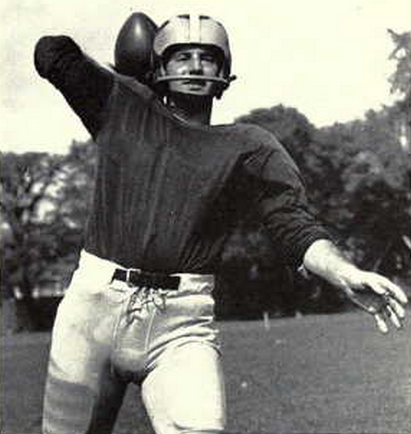
- Stan Noskin, c. 1959

No. 27 – Michigan Wolverines
- Position: Quarterback

Personal information
- Born: June 12, 1938 (age 88); Chicago, Illinois, U.S.
- Listed height: 5 ft 11 in (1.80 m)
- Listed weight: 180 lb (82 kg)

Career information
- High school: Evanston Township (Evanston, Illinois)
- College: Michigan

Career history
- 1957–1959: Michigan

Stanton Charles Noskin (born June 12, 1938) is an American former football player. He played at the quarterback position for the University of Michigan from 1957 to 1959. He was the starting quarterback for the 1959 Michigan Wolverines football team. He later became a dentist in Skokie, Illinois.

== Early life ==
A native of Chicago, Illinois, Noskin was the son of Dr. Joseph M. Noskin, a Chicago dentist, and Ruth Noskin (née Hendler). He attended Evanston Township High School. As a senior, he completed 38 of 58 passes in seven Suburban League games and led Evanston to the league football championship in 1955. He was also selected as an Illinois All-State quarterback in 1955.

== University of Michigan ==
Noskin enrolled at the University of Michigan in 1956. He was the third Jewish quarterback to start for the Michigan Wolverines football team, following Benny Friedman and Harry Newman.

=== 1957 season ===
Prior to the start of the 1957 season, Associated Press sports editor Jerry Liska visited Michigan's training camp. After seeing Noskin throw the ball, Liska wrote that, though Jim Van Pelt returned as a seasoned quarterback, "the real threat at this position could be soph Stan Noskin from Chicago." Michigan head coach Bennie Oosterbaan rated Noskin as "Michigan's best tosser since Chuck Ortmann," the Big Ten Conference passing champion in 1948.

The more experienced Van Pelt was named the starting quarterback for the 1957 Michigan team, but Noskin played in all nine games for the team. In the second game of the 1957 season, Noskin led Michigan to a 26–0 victory over Georgia. He scored two rushing touchdowns against the Bulldogs and completed five of nine passes for 80 yards, including a 35-yard pass to Dave Bowers. At the end of October 1957, Noskin threw a 37-yard touchdown pass to Bowers in a 24–7 win over Minnesota.

In November 1957, Detroit sports writer Jerry Green credited Noskin with turning Van Pelt into a "topnotch quarterback." Green wrote: "Noskin was just another varsity candidate in the spring. But the threat of the daring sophomore taking his job away spurred Van Pelt into doing things he never considered before. Most of all, Noskin's passing ability made Van Pelt into a better passer."

=== 1958 season ===
As a junior, Noskin was a backup to Bob Ptacek, the Most Valuable Player on the 1958 team. Despite Ptacek's strong play, Noskin played in seven of nine games for the 1958 team. In the season opener, Noskin completed five of eight passes for 69 yards in 20–19 win over USC. Two weeks later, he completed five of eight passes for 78 yards against Navy.

=== 1959 season ===
As a senior, Noskin was the starting quarterback in all nine games for the 1959 Michigan Wolverines football team. Under first-year head coach Bump Elliott, the team finished with a disappointing record of 4–5.

In the 1959 season opener against Missouri, Noskin completed 7 of 15 passes for 119 yards, including a 44-yard touchdown pass to Bennie McRae. He also threw three interceptions, as the Wolverines lost to Missouri, 20–15.

After a 1–3 start to the season, Noskin led the Michigan team to a 3–2 record in the final five games, starting with a 14–7 upset victory over Minnesota. Noskin completed five of nine passes and, according to the Associated Press, "ran the squad brilliantly in leading Michigan to its first Big Ten victory of the year."

On October 31, 1959, Noskin set a Michigan record by throwing five interceptions in a 19–10 loss to Wisconsin. In the same game, Noskin gained only 14 yards on passes. Noskin threw a total of 15 interceptions for th year, second most among major college players. Playing on defense, Noskin also intercepted a pass thrown by Wisconsin quarterback Dale Hackbart pass on the Michigan 26-yard line. Two plays later, Noskin threw an interception that was caught by Wisconsin center Bob Nelson at the 30-yard line. Wisconsin scored its final touchdown six plays later on a run by Wisconsin fullback, Tom Wiesner. Michigan quarterbacks gave up a total of six interceptions in the Wisconsin game, as backup Paul Palmer also gave up an interception. Noskin's single-game school interception record stood until 1987, when Demetrius Brown threw seven interceptions against Michigan State.

One week after the loss to Wisconsin, Noskin rebounded by leading Michigan to a 20–15 win over Illinois. He completed seven of ten passes for 79 yards, including a touchdown pass to 1959 Michigan MVP Tony Rio. After the Wisconsin game, the Michigan coaches encouraged Noskin to run more, noting that the opposition never worried about Noskin's running and could concentrate on his passes. He had run for 23 yards in the first six games of the season and ran for 22 yards against Illinois. After Noskin's rebound against Illinois, the Associated Press wrote: "How Stan Noskin goes, so goes Michigan football – or at least that's been the pattern in the last three games."

Against Indiana, Noskin set career highs in attempts and completions with a 14-for-24 passing performance. He threw a 25-yard touchdown pass to John Halstead in the game. He also threw three interceptions, and backup John Stamos added a fourth, as Michigan lost the game, 26–7.

In his final game for Michigan, Noskin led the Wolverines to a 23–14 victory over Ohio State. He completed seven of ten passes for 88 yards. The loss gave Woody Hayes his first losing season (3–5–1) at Ohio State. Noskin threw a touchdown pass to Tony Rio, ran for another and set up the third with key third-down pass conversions. In its game coverage, the Associated Press wrote:

"The 56th meeting between the Big Ten teams turned into a personal tug of war between Michigan's Stan Noskin and Ohio's Roger Detrick. Noskin, who has made the trip from hero to bum and back again many times, wound up his spotty career with a flawless direction of the spirited Michigan team. Time after time he came through with clutch passes on third down. Noskin passed for Michigan's first score, ran for the second and set up the third with a pair of daring third-down passes."

In a December 1959 speech to the Michigan Club of Chicago, head coach Bump Elliott mentioned Noskin as one of the best players on the 1959 team along with Tony Rio, Darrell Harper and Fred Julian, but noted that the strength of the team was its reliance upon the squad as a whole rather than upon individual stars.

=== Career statistics ===
In three years at Michigan, Noskin completed 98 of 196 passes for 1,245 yards, and seven touchdowns. At the conclusion of his career, Noskin's 1,245 passing yards ranked second in University of Michigan history behind Chuck Ortmann. He also held Michigan's career record with 21 interceptions; his record was broken by Rick Leach who threw 35 interceptions between 1975 and 1978.

== Career as a dentist ==
After graduating from the University of Michigan in 1960, Noskin attended the Loyola University School of Dentistry in Chicago. He subsequently practiced as a dentist in Skokie, Illinois with his father and brother, Gerald Noskin. He is a member of the American Dental Society, the Illinois Dental Society, the Chicago Dental Society, and Alpha Omega, a professional Jewish dental fraternity.

== Family ==
Noskin became engaged to Sharon Ruth Novak in March 1962. Noskin and his wife, Sharon, have two children and two granddaughters.
