= 1959 Purdue Boilermakers football team =

American college football season

1959 Purdue Boilermakers football
- Conference: Big Ten Conference
- Record: 5–2–2 (4–2–1 Big Ten)
- Head coach: Jack Mollenkopf (4th season)
- MVP: Len Jardine
- Captains: Len Jardine; Sam Joyner
- Home stadium: Ross–Ade Stadium

1959 Big Ten Conference football standings
	Conf.					Overall
Team	W		L		T	W		L		T
No. 6 Wisconsin $	5	–	2	–	0	7	–	3	–	0
Michigan State	4	–	2	–	0	5	–	4	–	0
Purdue	4	–	2	–	1	5	–	2	–	2
No. 13 Illinois	4	–	2	–	1	5	–	3	–	1
Northwestern	4	–	3	–	0	6	–	3	–	0
Iowa	3	–	3	–	0	5	–	4	–	0
Michigan	3	–	4	–	0	4	–	5	–	0
Indiana	2	–	4	–	1	4	–	4	–	1
Ohio State	2	–	4	–	1	3	–	5	–	1
Minnesota	1	–	6	–	0	2	–	7	–	0
$ – Conference champion; Rankings from AP Poll

The 1959 Purdue Boilermakers football team was an American football team that represented Purdue University during the 1959 Big Ten Conference football season. In their fourth season under head coach Jack Mollenkopf, the Boilermakers compiled a 5–2–2 record, finished in a tie for third place in the Big Ten Conference with a 4–2–1 record against conference opponents, and outscored opponents by a total of 109 to 81.

== Schedule ==
Date	Opponent	Rank	Site	Result	Attendance	Source
September 18	at UCLA*	No. 11	Los Angeles Memorial Coliseum; Los Angeles, CA	T 0–0	38,582–38,675	
October 3	No. 8 Notre Dame*		Ross–Ade Stadium; West Lafayette, IN (rivalry)	W 28–7	50,362	
October 10	No. 9 Wisconsin	No. 7	Ross–Ade Stadium; West Lafayette, IN	W 21–0	41,542	
October 17	at Ohio State	No. 6	Ohio Stadium; Columbus, OH	L 0–15	83,391	
October 24	No. 15 Iowa^{†}	No. 14	Ross–Ade Stadium; West Lafayette, IN	W 14–7	47,112	
October 31	at Illinois	No. 11	Memorial Stadium; Champaign, IL (rivalry)	T 7–7	42,553	
November 7	at Michigan State	No. 14	Spartan Stadium; East Lansing, MI	L 0–15	58,203	
November 14	Minnesota		Ross–Ade Stadium; West Lafayette, IN	W 29–23	34,655	
November 21	at Indiana		Memorial Stadium; Bloomington, IN (Old Oaken Bucket)	W 10–7	32,325	
*Non-conference game; ^{†}Homecoming; Rankings from AP Poll released prior to the game; Source:

== Roster ==
- Bernie Allen, QB
- Jerry Beabout, OL
- Bob Becker, OL
- Fred Brandel, OL
- Dick Brooks, WR
- Jake Ciccone, OL
- Jack Elwell, WR
- Ross Fichtner, QB
- Joe Gliwa, RB
- Jack Greiner, WR
- Maury Guttman, QB
- Len Jardine, WR
- Bob Jarus, RB
- Wayne Jones, RB
- Sam Joyner, OL
- Phil Kardasz, OL
- Joe Kulbacki, RB
- Dave Kurtz, RB
- Jack Laraway, RB
- Ron Maltony, OL
- Dick Mayoras, RB
- Donn Mayoras, RB
- Herb McGuire, QB
- Moose Mincevich, OL
- Joe Prest, QB
- Dale Rems, OL
- Stan Sczurek, OL
- Jim Tiller, RB
- Clyde Washington, RB
- Dennis Wierzal, QB
- Len Wilson, RB
- Manzie Winters, WR
- Wedge Winters, WR
