= 1959 Michigan State Spartans football team =

American college football season

1959 Michigan State Spartans football
- Conference: Big Ten Conference

Ranking
- Coaches: No. 16
- Record: 5–4 (4–2 Big Ten)
- Head coach: Duffy Daugherty (6th season)
- MVP: Dean Look
- Captain: Donald Wright
- Home stadium: Spartan Stadium

1959 Big Ten Conference football standings
	Conf.					Overall
Team	W		L		T	W		L		T
No. 6 Wisconsin $	5	–	2	–	0	7	–	3	–	0
Michigan State	4	–	2	–	0	5	–	4	–	0
Purdue	4	–	2	–	1	5	–	2	–	2
No. 13 Illinois	4	–	2	–	1	5	–	3	–	1
Northwestern	4	–	3	–	0	6	–	3	–	0
Iowa	3	–	3	–	0	5	–	4	–	0
Michigan	3	–	4	–	0	4	–	5	–	0
Indiana	2	–	4	–	1	4	–	4	–	1
Ohio State	2	–	4	–	1	3	–	5	–	1
Minnesota	1	–	6	–	0	2	–	7	–	0
$ – Conference champion; Rankings from AP Poll

The 1959 Michigan State Spartans football team represented Michigan State University in the 1959 Big Ten Conference football season. In their sixth season under head coach Duffy Daugherty, the Spartans compiled a 5–4 overall record (4–3 against Big Ten opponents), finished in second place in the Big Ten Conference, and were ranked No. 16 in the final Coaches Poll.

Quarterback Dean Look was selected by the Associated Press (AP) as a first-team player on the 1959 All-Big Ten Conference football team. Three other Spartans were selected for the third team: halfback Herb Adderly; tackle Palmer Pyle; and center Dave Manders.

The 1959 Spartans won all three of their annual rivalry games. In the annual Indiana–Michigan State football rivalry game, the Spartans defeated the Hoosiers by a 14 to 6 score. In the Notre Dame rivalry game, the Spartans defeated the Fighting Irish by a 19 to 0 score. And, in the annual Michigan–Michigan State football rivalry game, the Spartans defeated the Wolverines by a 34 to 8 score. In non-conference play, the Spartans lost to Texas A&M, 9–7, and the Miami Hurricanes, 18–13.

== Schedule ==
Date	Opponent	Rank	Site	Result	Attendance	Source
September 26	Texas A&M*		Spartan Stadium; East Lansing, MI	L 7–9	49,507–49,529	
October 3	at Michigan		Michigan Stadium; Ann Arbor, MI (rivalry)	W 34–8	103,234	
October 10	at No. 10 Iowa		Iowa Stadium; Iowa City, IA	L 8–37	59,300	
October 17	Notre Dame*		Spartan Stadium; East Lansing, MI (rivalry)	W 19–0	73,480	
October 24	Indiana^{†}		Spartan Stadium; East Lansing, MI (rivalry)	W 14–6	54,611	
October 31	at Ohio State		Ohio Stadium; Columbus, OH	L 24–30	83,130	
November 7	No. 14 Purdue		Spartan Stadium; East Lansing, MI	W 15–0	58,203	
November 14	No. 6 Northwestern	No. 19	Spartan Stadium; East Lansing, MI	W 15–10	38,421	
November 20	at No. 18 Miami (FL)*	No. 11	Burdine Stadium; Miami, FL	L 13–18	40,870	
*Non-conference game; ^{†}Homecoming; Rankings from AP Poll released prior to the game; Source:
