= Jeff Genyk =

American football player and coach (born 1960)

Biographical details
- Born: August 22, 1960 (age 66); Ann Arbor, Michigan, U.S.

Playing career
- 1978–1981: Bowling Green
- Position: Quarterback

Coaching career (HC unless noted)
- 1990–1992: Grand Rapids (QB/TE)
- 1992–1993: Northwestern (GA)
- 1994–1995: Northwestern (DFO)
- 1996: Northwestern (ST/ILB)
- 1997: Northwestern (ST/OLB)
- 1998: Northwestern (ST/S)
- 1999–2003: Northwestern (ST/RB)
- 2004–2008: Eastern Michigan
- 2010–2012: California (ST/TE)
- 2013: Nevada (ST/RB)
- 2013–2014: Wisconsin (ST/TE)
- 2015: Northwestern (QC)
- 2016–2017: Vanderbilt (ST/RB)
- 2018–2021: Northwestern (ST)
- 2022–2023: Northwestern (ST/TE)

Head coaching record
- Overall: 16–42

Jeffrey George Genyk (/ˈdʒɛnɪk/ JEN-ik; born August 22, 1960) is an American football coach and former player. He most recently served as the special teams coordinator for Northwestern. Genyk served as the head football coach at Eastern Michigan University from 2004 to 2008, compiling a record of 16–42 in five seasons. He was a television analyst for Atlantic Coast Conference football for ESPN during the 2009 season.

== Early career ==
Genyk was born in Ann Arbor, Michigan, and was raised in nearby Milan, Michigan. Jeff's father George Genyk played college football for the University of Michigan Wolverines, and served as a captain on the 1959 team. George was drafted by the New York Titans in the first tier of the 1960 American Football League draft.

Genyk graduated from Milan High School and went on to attend Bowling Green State University where he started at quarterback for the Falcons football team. He graduated in 1982 with a degree in Business Administration. He later earned a Master of Business Administration from Western Michigan University in 1989, and a master's in education from Northwestern University in 1994. During the interim, Genyk served as an assistant football coach at Grand Rapids Community College from 1990 to 1992. From 1994 to 2003, Genyk served as an assistant coach at Northwestern, at different times coaching linebackers, running backs, and the secondary. From 1998 to 2003 he served as special teams coordinator and recruiting coordinator. During his time at Northwestern, the Wildcats won three Big Ten Conference titles and participated in four bowl games.

The '95 and '96 squads (as well as the 2000 squad in perhaps one of the greatest games in college football history) defeated Michigan, which Northwestern had not done since 1965.

== Eastern Michigan ==
In his first season, 2004, Genyk helped lead EMU to a 4-4 Mid-American Conference record, the best record since the 1999 squad went 4–4 in Mid-American Conference play, and a 4–7 overall record. In addition, Genyk directed the Eagles to the Michigan MAC championship with wins over both in-state league rivals, Western Michigan and Central Michigan, for the first time since the 1986 season.

The 2005 season, Jeff Genyk's second as head coach, saw limited improvement as the Eagles finished with a 4–7 overall record (the same as 2004) and a 3-5 MAC mark. However, that final record could just as easily have been 6–5, 7–4, or even 8–3, as the Eagles dropped two one-point games (Miami University, Ball State), one two-point game (at Cincinnati), and one eight-point game (Western Michigan).

In 2006, EMU had just one win, the homecoming game against Toledo. Once again, the total could have been a lot higher, with six losses coming only by one possession. They lost two games by 8 (at Northwestern, at Kent State), one game in overtime by 7 (Central Michigan), one game by 6 (Ohio), and two games by 3 (at Bowling Green, at Western Michigan).

In 2007, the Eagles finished third in the MAC West, their highest showing since 1997. This included wins over Western Michigan University and Central Michigan University, giving EMU the Michigan MAC Trophy.

After tallying a 3–9 record during the 2008 campaign and going 16–42 overall during his five years at the helm, Genyk was fired in November. He coached the season's final game against Central Michigan, a 56–52 upset in front of a home crowd in Ypsilanti.

== After Eastern Michigan ==
During the 2009 season, Genyk served as a color commentator for ACC games on ESPN.

From 2010 to 2012, Genyk served as the special teams coordinator and tight ends coach at the University of California under head coach Jeff Tedford.

On January 23, 2013, Genyk was announced as the special teams coordinator and running backs coach at the University of Nevada, Reno under new head coach Brian Polian. Genyk served at Nevada for a little over a month before departing for the University of Wisconsin to serve as special teams coordinator and tight ends coach under head coach Gary Andersen.

For the 2015 season, Genyk rekindled a working relationship with Northwestern University, serving as a quality control coach and consulting head coach Pat Fitzgerald on special teams, offense and game management.

On January 21, 2016, Genyk was announced as the special teams coordinator and running backs coach at Vanderbilt University under head coach Derek Mason. After two sub-.500 seasons, the Vanderbilt parted ways with Genyk.

On February 9, 2018, it was announced that Genyk would again be rejoining the Northwestern coaching staff, this time as their special teams coordinator. In 2022, he added the responsibility of tight ends coach. On December 28, 2023, five days after the Wildcats beat Utah in the Las Vegas Bowl, it was reported that Genyk would not be retained by Northwestern.

== Head coaching record ==
| Year | Team | Overall | Conference | Standing | Bowl/playoffs |
|---|---|---|---|---|---|
Eastern Michigan Eagles (Mid-American Conference) (2004–2008)
| 2004 | Eastern Michigan | 4–7 | 4–4 | 4th (West) | |
| 2005 | Eastern Michigan | 4–7 | 3–5 | 6th (West) | |
| 2006 | Eastern Michigan | 1–11 | 1–7 | 6th (West) | |
| 2007 | Eastern Michigan | 4–8 | 3–4 | T–3rd (West) | |
| 2008 | Eastern Michigan | 3–9 | 2–6 | 6th (West) | |
| Eastern Michigan: | | 16–42 | 13–26 | | |
| Total: | | 16–42 | | | |
