= 1959 Wisconsin Badgers football team =

American college football season

1959 Wisconsin Badgers football

Big Ten champion

Rose Bowl, L 8–44 vs. Washington
- Conference: Big Ten Conference

Ranking
- Coaches: No. 6
- AP: No. 6
- Record: 7–3 (5–2 Big Ten)
- Head coach: Milt Bruhn (4th season)
- MVP: Jerry Stalcup
- Captains: Jerry Stalcup; Bob Zeman
- Home stadium: Camp Randall Stadium

1959 Big Ten Conference football standings
	Conf.					Overall
Team	W		L		T	W		L		T
No. 6 Wisconsin $	5	–	2	–	0	7	–	3	–	0
Michigan State	4	–	2	–	0	5	–	4	–	0
Purdue	4	–	2	–	1	5	–	2	–	2
No. 13 Illinois	4	–	2	–	1	5	–	3	–	1
Northwestern	4	–	3	–	0	6	–	3	–	0
Iowa	3	–	3	–	0	5	–	4	–	0
Michigan	3	–	4	–	0	4	–	5	–	0
Indiana	2	–	4	–	1	4	–	4	–	1
Ohio State	2	–	4	–	1	3	–	5	–	1
Minnesota	1	–	6	–	0	2	–	7	–	0
$ – Conference champion; Rankings from AP Poll

The 1959 Wisconsin Badgers football team represented the University of Wisconsin in the 1959 Big Ten Conference football season. Led by fourth-year head coach Milt Bruhn, the Badgers compiled an overall record of 7–3 with a mark of 5–2 in conference play, winning the Big Ten title. Wisconsin lost to underdog Washington in the Rose Bowl on New Year's Day. The Badgers finished the season ranked sixth in both major polls.

== Schedule ==
Date	Opponent	Rank	Site	Result	Attendance	Source
September 26	Stanford*	No. 8	Camp Randall Stadium; Madison, WI	W 16–14	41,892	
October 3	Marquette*	No. 12	Camp Randall Stadium; Madison, WI	W 44–6	47,970	
October 10	at No. 7 Purdue	No. 9	Ross–Ade Stadium; West Lafayette, IN	L 0–21	41,542	
October 17	No. 9 Iowa		Camp Randall Stadium; Madison, WI (rivalry)	W 25–16	64,256	
October 24	No. 20 Ohio State	No. 12	Camp Randall Stadium; Madison, WI	W 12–3	55,440	
October 31	at Michigan	No. 10	Michigan Stadium; Ann Arbor, MI	W 19–10	68,063	
November 7	at No. 2 Northwestern	No. 9	Dyche Stadium; Evanston, IL	W 24–19	55,282	
November 14	Illinois^{†}	No. 7	Camp Randall Stadium; Madison, WI	L 6–9	56,028	
November 21	at Minnesota	No. 9	Memorial Stadium; Minneapolis, MN (rivalry)	W 11–7	53,647	
January 1, 1960	vs. No. 8 Washington*	No. 6	Rose Bowl Stadium; Pasadena, CA (1960 Rose Bowl)	L 8–44	100,089	
*Non-conference game; ^{†}Homecoming; Rankings from AP Poll released prior to the game; Source:

== NFL draft ==
Five Badgers were selected in the 1960 NFL draft.

Player	Position	Round	Overall	Franchise
Dale Hackbart	Back	5	51	Green Bay Packers
Jerry Stalcup	Guard	6	62	Los Angeles Rams
Dan Lanphear	Tackle	8	90	Pittsburgh Steelers
Jim Heinke	Tackle	16	190	San Francisco 49ers
Bob Nelson	Center	20	235	Cleveland Browns
