= Ross Fichtner =

American football player (1938–2022)

No. 20, 28
- Position: Cornerback

Personal information
- Born: October 26, 1938; McKeesport, Pennsylvania, U.S.
- Died: October 14, 2022 (aged 83); Plymouth, Michigan, U.S.
- Listed height: 6 ft 0 in (1.83 m)
- Listed weight: 185 lb (84 kg)

Career information
- High school: McKeesport (PA)
- College: Purdue
- NFL draft: 1960: 3rd round, 33rd overall pick
- AFL draft: 1960: 2nd round

Career history

Playing
- Cleveland Browns (1960–1967); New Orleans Saints (1968)

Coaching
- Florida Blazers (1974) Defensive backs coach; Chicago Bears (1975–1977) Defensive backs coach; Green Bay Packers (1980–1983) Defensive backs coach; Minnesota Vikings (1984) Defensive backs coach

Awards and highlights
- NFL champion (1964)

Career NFL statistics
- Interceptions: 27
- Fumble recoveries: 3
- Total touchdowns: 3
- Stats at Pro Football Reference

Ross William Fichtner (October 26, 1938 – October 14, 2022) was an American professional football former cornerback in the NFL for the Cleveland Browns (1960 to 1967) and New Orleans Saints (1968). He played college football at Purdue University where he succeeded Len Dawson as the starting quarterback; he twice led the Boilermakers in passing (1957 and 1958) and total offense (1957 and 1958). He played in the Blue-Gray Game following the 1959 season. He is also the father of Randy Fichtner, who formerly served as the receivers coach, quarterbacks coach, and offensive coordinator for the Pittsburgh Steelers.

== Early life ==
Fichtner was born on October 26, 1938, in McKeesport, Pennsylvania. He attended McKeesport High School. Fichtner was a quarterback on the school's football team, under coach Al Hager.

== College career ==
Fichtner originally intended to go to the University of Miami in Florida after high school. However, when his high school coach Al Hager took a job as freshman football coach at Purdue University, Fichtner followed Hager to Purdue. He played quarterback on Purdue's freshman football team in 1956. His teammates named him the freshman team's most valuable player and a co-captain. In 1956, Purdue's starting varsity quarterback was future Pro Football Hall of Famer Len Dawson. Fichtner's freshman quarterback coach was George Steinbrenner, who later gained fame as the owner of the New York Yankees.

Fichtner played three years at quarterback on the Purdue Boilermakers varsity team, under head coach Jack Mollenkopf. He also played defensive back for the Boilermakers. He succeeded Dawson at starting quarterback in 1957, leading the Boilermakers in passing attempts, passing yards and passing touchdowns in 1957. And although Fichtner had –30 yards rushing, he still led the team in total yards on offense. One of his 1957 teammates was Erich Barnes, who would play alongside Fichtner with the Cleveland Browns from 1965 to 1967. In 1958, Fichtner again led the team in passing attempts, yards and touchdowns, and had 130 rushing yards; leading the team in total offense in yards gained.

Fichtner suffered a fractured shoulder early in his senior season (1959) in a game against Notre Dame, limiting his playing time that season. The injury occurred during the second game of the season. At the time, Mollenkopf believed Fichtner would not be able to come back that season, and suggested the possibility that Fichtner could play an additional season for Purdue in 1960. Bernie Allen played the majority of games at quarterback for Purdue that season; and later went on to play 12 years in Major League Baseball.

After missing three games in 1959, Fichtner did return to play in 1959. At first, he played sparingly in the team's next two games. In the team's eighth game, against the University of Minnesota, Allen played quarterback for most of the game, but Fichtner starred as a defensive back, with three interceptions. Fichtner returned his first interception 35 yards to set up a Purdue touchdown with less than two minutes left in the first half. On the last play of the first half, Fichtner intercepted another pass, and returned it 66 yards for a touchdown. It was the only touchdown he scored in his three-year Purdue career. With less than two minutes to play in the game, Fichtner got his third interception, and stayed in to finish the game at quarterback, in a 29–23 Purdue win. His three interceptions in a game remained a school record until broken by Paul Beery in 1976.

He was one of the Boilermakers' star players in the final game of the season, a victory over the University of Indiana. He was the starting quarterback in that annual Purdue-Indiana rivalry game, known as the Old Oaken Bucket game. He later was named outstanding player in the December 1959 Blue-Gray Game. He quarterbacked the Blue team to a 20–8 upset victory.

== Professional career ==
=== Cleveland Browns ===
The Cleveland Browns selected Fichtner in the third round of the 1960 NFL draft, 33rd overall. The Buffalo Bills selected him in the second round of the 1960 AFL draft. The Browns drafted Fichtner to play in the defensive backfield. Fichtner realized he would not be an NFL quarterback, as he lacked the arm strength to be a successful passer. During his first two seasons (1960 and 1961), Fichtner was a reserve defensive back with the Browns.

After being in military service before the 1962 season, Fichtner came back during training camp. He was promoted to the Browns starting strong safety during the 1962 season. His seven interceptions led the Browns that season, and tied for third best in the NFL. In the season opener against the New York Giants, Fichtner intercepted a pass from future Hall of Fame quarterback Y. A. Tittle. Later in the season, he intercepted a pass thrown by future Hall of Fame quarterback Sonny Jurgensen in a tie-game against the Philadelphia Eagles.

Fichtner started 13 games at free safety in 1963, with two interceptions and one fumble recovery. The Browns finished second in the NFL East Division, with a 10–4 record. He returned an interception against the Philadelphia Eagles' King Hill 39 yards in an early November game. Later that month he returned an interception 36 yards for a touchdown against Don Meredith and the Dallas Cowboys, a key score in a Browns' 27–17 win.

In 1964, Fichtner started the first four games of the season. In the fourth game on October 4, he suffered a concussion against the Dallas Cowboys that almost ended his season. In making a tackle on Cowboys' receiver Frank Clarke, his head collided with Clarke's knee and Fichtner almost swallowed his tongue. Fichtner had double vision for the next five weeks, and did not start again until the last game of the season against the New York Giants. The Browns finished the season 10–3–1, first in the NFL's East Division. Fichtner had two interceptions and one fumble recovery that season.

The Browns defeated the Baltimore Colts 27–0 in the 1964 NFL championship game on December 27. Fichtner started at free safety in that game. He was assigned to cover future NFL Hall of Fame tight end John Mackey, who only had one pass reception for two yards in the game. During the season, the Browns' defensive backs had played off the line of scrimmage with space between them and receivers they were to cover, allowing short passes. In the championship game, the Browns' defensive backs played the Colts' receivers tightly and disrupted the timing between Hall of Fame Baltimore Colts' quarterback Johnny Unitas and his receivers. After the game, Fichtner said "This is the greatest moment in my life, especially coming back after being injured. I really wanted to play in this one, but I didn't know if I would there for a while".

In 1965, Fichtner came back to start all 14 Browns' games at strong safety, with four interceptions and one fumble recovery. During an October 3 game against the Philadelphia Eagles, Fichtner returned an interception for a touchdown on a King Hill pass (32 yards).

1966 was arguably his best professional season. He started 13 games at strong safety, with a career-high eight interceptions. His eight interceptions tied for second best in the NFL. The Associated Press named him second-team All-Pro. He had three interceptions in an October 23 game against Don Meredith and the Dallas Cowboys. He had returned the third interception 58 yards when he was caught and tackled from behind by the Cowboys' future Hall of Fame receiver Bob Hayes, who was also an Olympic gold medal sprinter and nicknamed "the World's Fastest Human". The Associated Press named Fichtner the NFL's Defensive Player of the Week for his defensive performance against the Cowboys. In 1966, he also intercepted a Sunny Jurgensen pass in the season's first game. In a December 11 game against the Philadelphia Eagles, he intercepted a Jack Concannon pass and returned it 39 yards for a touchdown.

Fichtner's last season with the Browns was 1967. He started 12 games, with four interceptions and a fumble recovery. He had two interceptions on October 8 against the Pittsburgh Steelers. In an October 1 game against the New Orleans Saints, Browns' defensive back Erich Barnes intercepted a pass and then lateralled the ball to Fichtner who ran either 88 or 93 yards and was tackled on the Saints' two-yard line by receiver John Gilliam. Fichtner anticipated the possibility of a lateral from Barnes, saying at the time "I played college ball with him ... and I know he's liable to do anything".

=== Golf tournament incident ===
In July 1968, Fichter's career in Cleveland ended because of a racial conflict over an early July local Ashland, Ohio celebrity golf tournament in which he was on the planning committee. It was reported at the time that no black players had been invited to participate in the event that year, unlike the prior years. Fichtner’s teammate John Wooten, a leader among the team’s black players, strongly confronted Fichtner verbally on the issue as one of racial discrimination. Fichtner stated to Wooten and publicly that his motivation was not racial bias in not inviting the black players (among others), and maintained publicly thereafter that he was not biased against blacks. Wooten and Fichtner had discussions between themselves about the matter, before a team meeting of 10 to 15 players in the Cleveland area about this and other matters on the team. Wooten actually considered race relations among Browns players to be good compared to almost every other NFL team. Fichtner realized, however, that if the team's 15 black players felt as strongly as Wooten about the golfing incident, it would be difficult to continue on the Browns; and he was aware the Browns' owner (Art Modell), general manager (Harold Sauerbrei), and coach (Blanton Collier) were upset by the events.

The matter became highly publicized in Cleveland, with other Browns' players being asked their opinions; and was covered nationally by writers like Dick Young, Bill Wallace, and Ira Berkow. Popular Browns linebacker Vince Costello believed Fichtner was among the least prejudiced people he knew on the team. Defensive tackle Walter Johnson said if the situation were reversed, he would not have played in a tournament that only invited black players. Johnson did not believe the incident would affect the quality of the team's football play in the coming season, "but the togetherness won't be there". Browns quarterback Frank Ryan said, "I can't see the ugliness being implied here being true. I think it's more of a misunderstanding than anything else. The great thing about football is that it's a team sport–and you've got to have harmony".

On July 19, the Browns waived both Fichtner and Wooten. Wooten had been with the Browns for nine years, and Fichtner eight. Modell wished the matter had been addressed internally and not publicly, and found waiving the players distasteful. He said he thought it was necessary for team harmony to dismiss both players. Fichtner was surprised to be waived, and was not happy about leaving the Browns.

Fichtner's nickname during his Browns' playing career was "Rocky". In eight years with the Browns, Fichtner started 71 games, with 27 interceptions, three returned for touchdowns. Fichtner's 21.5 yards per interception return is 26th in AFL-NFL history (through 2025).

=== New Orleans Saints ===
Fichtner signed to play with the New Orleans Saints in late July. He was waived before the season started, but reactivated a few days later. With the Saints in his final NFL season, Fichtner was a reserve defensive back, appearing in only four games; and was on the Saints' taxi squad for the majority of the season, as coach Tom Fears wanted to evaluate his younger players. The Saints released Fichtner in July 1969, before the season started. Wooten went on to play for the Washington Redskins in 1968, also his last in the NFL.

After Fichtner joined the Saints, Ernie Wheelwright, one of the team's black players said that when Fichtner first joined the team "one of the players said to me, That's the Fichtner cat, the one who didn't invite any of the brothers to the golf tournament. I said, Is that right? But I wanted to see for myself what he was like. He's OK as far as I'm concerned".

== Coaching career ==
In 1974, Fichtner was a defensive backs coach for the Florida Blazers of the World Football League. He went on to work as a defensive backs coach for the Chicago Bears (1975 to 1977), Green Bay Packers (1980 to 1983) and Minnesota Vikings (1984).

== Personal life and death ==
After retiring from football, Fichtner lived and worked as a salesman in Pittsburgh, and as a manufacturer's representative in Meadville, Pennsylvania. During this time, in 1970, he was called to testify before a federal grand jury as part of an investigation into possible antitrust violations by the NFL, focusing on the relationship between NFL management and NFL players. He was asked about whether there were league-wide agreements to keep him or others from playing (blackballing), but he told the grand jury he did not know about that. When asked by media members whether he believed he was blackballed, Fichtner thought he should have been treated better, but would not say he was blackballed.

Fitchner and his family later lived in Plymouth, Michigan (near Detroit), where he worked as a salesman for a paper company. With his wife Karen's acceptance, he wore his 1964 NFL championship ring rather than his wedding ring. He worked with the Fellowship of Christian Athletes; and Athletes in Action, providing instruction on how to coach qualities of character in athletes.

In 1968, Fichtner was an extra in a football-based movie starring Charlton Heston and directed by Tom Gries, shot in New Orleans. During the shooting, the movie was referred to as "Pro" but when released it was entitled, Number One.

His oldest son Randy also played college football at Purdue until suffering a shoulder injury. Randy then went on to a college and professional coaching career. Among other coaching positions in college, Randy Fichtner was a wide receivers coach at Purdue, and an offensive coordinator at Arkansas State and Memphis (where he was also the quarterbacks coach). On the professional level, he coached for the Pittsburgh Steelers from 2007 to 2020, serving as offensive coordinator and quarterbacks coach during his last three seasons in Pittsburgh.

Fichtner died from Parkinson's disease on October 14, 2022, in Plymouth, Michigan. He resided in a memory loss facility for the last 18 months of his life. His obituary stated that Fichtner developed Parkinson’s disease and dementia as the result of concussions he received as a football player. At the time of Fichtner's death, he and Karen Fichtner had been married for 49 years. He also was survived by five children, 12 grandchildren and four great-grandchildren.

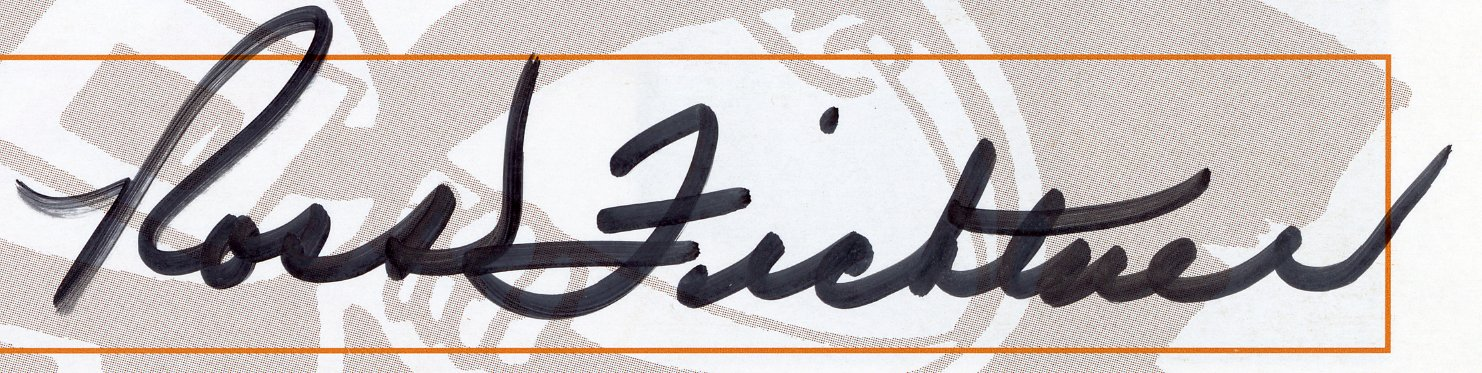
