= Darrell Harper =

American football player (1938–2008)

- Harper in 1959

No. 41
- Positions: Halfback, placekicker

Personal information
- Born: June 18, 1938; U.S.
- Died: January 19, 2008 (aged 69); Commerce Township, Michigan, U.S.
- Listed height: 6 ft 1 in (1.85 m)
- Listed weight: 195 lb (88 kg)

Career information
- High school: Royal Oak (Royal Oak, Michigan)
- College: Michigan
- NFL draft: 1960: 15th round, 171st overall pick
- AFL draft: 1960

Career history
- Buffalo Bills (1960)

Career AFL statistics
- Field goals made: 2
- Field goal attempts: 3
- Field goal %: 66.7
- Rushing yards: 3
- Stats at Pro Football Reference

Darrell L. Harper (June 18, 1938 – January 19, 2008) was an American football player. He played at the halfback position for the University of Michigan from 1957 to 1959 and for the Buffalo Bills in the 1960 AFL season. On September 11, 1960, Harper scored the first official points in the history of the Bills. He also made the Bills' first kickoff, first field goal and first extra point kick.

== University of Michigan ==
Harper attended high school in Royal Oak, Michigan, before enrolling at the University of Michigan in 1956. He played football for the Michigan Wolverines football team from 1957 to 1959.

As a junior, Harper appeared in 7 of 9 games for the 1958 Michigan Wolverines football team, three of them as the starting left halfback. He was Michigan's leading rusher in 1958, totaling 309 rushing yards, 137 receiving yards, 131 passing yards, 60 kickoff return yards and 33 punt return yards. Playing against Minnesota in October 1958, Harper ran 58 yards for the game-winning touchdown on the first play of the second half. Harper also handled punting duties for Michigan; he had a 61-yard punt against Michigan State in October 1958.

As a senior, Harper started all nine games at the left halfback position for the 1959 Michigan Wolverines football team. In the third quarter of the October 1959 game against Minnesota, Harper caught a punt at Michigan's 17-yard line and returned it 83 yards for the game's first points. The return set the Michigan record for the longest punt return, a record which stood until 1972 when David Brown returned a punt 88 yards. During the 1959 season, Harper rushed for 224 yards and also contributed 101 yards on punt returns and 62 yards on kickoff returns.

== Buffalo Bills ==
Harper was selected by the Detroit Lions in the 15th round (171st overall pick) of the 1960 NFL draft. He signed instead with the Buffalo Bills in the newly formed American Football League. Harper played as a halfback and placekicker for the 1960 Buffalo Bills and led the AFL with 10 extra points. At 2:08 p.m. on Sunday, September 11, 1960, Harper made the opening kickoff in the first regular-season game in the history of the Buffalo Bills. He also scored "the first official points" in Bills' history (and the first points in the game) on a field goal from the 35-yard line. After taking a 3-0 lead on Harper's field goal, Buffalo did not score again and lost by a score of 27-3 to the New York Titans.

In the Bill's second game (and home opener) on September 18, 1960, Harper successfully converted the Bills' first extra point kick after Wray Carlton ran for the team's first touchdown.

Playing against the Los Angeles Chargers on October 2, 1960, Harper kicked the second field goal in team history.

== Later years and death ==
After finishing his career as a football player, Harper worked as a teacher and high school football coach for many years in [Southfield, Oakland County, Michigan| Southfield-Lathrup High School]. He also coached at Walled Lake Central High School. Harper died in January 2008 at age 69. He died of complications of multiple myeloma at Huron Valley-Sinai Hospital in Commerce Township, Michigan.
