= Jack Nelson (American football coach) =

American football player and coach (1927–1978)

Biographical details
- Born: July 13, 1927
- Died: November 19, 1978 (aged 51); Edina, Minnesota, U.S.

Playing career
- 1947–1949: Gustavus Adolphus

Coaching career (HC unless noted)
- 1954: Colorado (freshman)
- 1955–1957: Utah State (ends)
- 1958: Colorado (ends)
- 1959–1965: Michigan (ends)
- 1966–1970: Gustavus Adolphus
- 1971–1978: Minnesota Vikings (LB)

Head coaching record
- Overall: 32–11–4

Accomplishments and honors

Championships
- 2 MIAC (1967–1968)

Awards
- Gustavus Adolphus College Athletic Hall of Fame (1979)

Jack "Jocko" Nelson (July 12, 1927 – November 19, 1978) was an American football coach. He coached football at Utah State University (1955–1957), the University of Colorado (1958), the University of Michigan (1959–1965), Gustavus Adolphus College (1966–1970), and for the Minnesota Vikings of the National Football League (1971–1978).

== Early years ==
Nelson was born in Minnesota in 1927. He grew up in Hibbing, Minnesota. He competed for Hibbing High School in basketball, football, track and baseball. From 1946 to 1950, he attended Gustavus Adolphus College in St. Peter, Minnesota. Nelson lettered in football, basketball, hockey, track and baseball at Gustavus Adolphus. He also briefly played professional baseball in the Milwaukee Braves organization.

== Coaching career ==
After graduating from Gustavus Adophus, Nelson spent four years as a teacher and football coach at Grand Marais High School and Mora High School. In 1955, he was hired as an assistant football coach at Utah State University. He remained at Utah State until 1958. From 1958 to 1959, he was an assistant football coach at the University of Colorado.

In 1959, he was hired as a member of Bump Elliott's coaching staff at the University of Michigan. He was an assistant football coach in charge of the ends at Michigan from 1959 to 1965.

In April 1966, Nelson was named as the head football coach at Gustavus Adolphus College in St. Peter, Minnesota. He also held the title of associate professor of physical education at Gustavus Adophus. He remained as the head coach at Gustavus Adophus for five years from 1966 to 1970. In 1967 and 1968, his teams won Minnesota Intercollegiate Athletic Conference championships.

In March 1971, Nelson was hired as an assistant defensive coach of the Minnesota Vikings. He remained with the Vikings' coaching staff for eight years. From 1971 to 1978, he served as a special teams and linebackers coach for the Vikings. He helped lead the Vikings' Purple People Eaters defense to three Super Bowls in four years from 1974 to 1977.

In addition to his career as a football coach, Nelson also owned and operated Jocko's Clearwater Lodge & Canoe Outfitters starting in 1964.

Nelson died in November 1978 at Southdale Hospital in Minneapolis, 18 days after suffering from a heart attack while playing racquetball or handball with Vikings' defensive coordinator Bob Hollway. He died during the first quarter of the Vikings' game against the San Diego Chargers, and head coach Bud Grant learned of Nelson's death shortly before halftime. The team wore black armbands for the last four games in 1978 in memory of Nelson. Nelson and his wife, Lee, had four children.

Nelson was posthumously inducted into the Gustavus Adolphus College Athletics Hall of Fame in 1979.

== Head coaching record ==
Year	Team	Overall	Conference	Standing	Bowl/playoffs
Gustavus Adolphus Gusties (Minnesota Intercollegiate Athletic Conference) (1966–1970)
1966	Gustavus Adolphus	5–2–2	4–1–2	2nd	
1967	Gustavus Adolphus	6–3	6–1	1st	
1968	Gustavus Adolphus	7–1–1	6–0–1	1st	
1969	Gustavus Adolphus	6–3–1	4–2–1	4th	
1970	Gustavus Adolphus	8–2	5–2	T–2nd	
Gustavus Adolphus:		32–11–4	25–6–4		
Total:		32–11–4			
National championship Conference title Conference division title or championship game berth
