= 1959 Notre Dame Fighting Irish football team =

American college football season

1959 Notre Dame Fighting Irish football
- Conference: Independent

Ranking
- Coaches: No. 18
- AP: No. 17
- Record: 5–5
- Head coach: Joe Kuharich (1st season)
- Captain: Ken Adamson
- Home stadium: Notre Dame Stadium

1959 Midwestern major college football independents records
	Conf.			Overall
Team	W	L	T	W		L		T
Detroit		–		6	–	4	–	0
No. 17 Notre Dame		–		5	–	5	–	0
Dayton		–		3	–	7	–	0
Marquette		–		3	–	7	–	0
Rankings from AP poll

The 1959 Notre Dame Fighting Irish football team was an American football team that represented the University of Notre Dame as an independent during the 1958 college football season. In their first year under head coach Joe Kuharich, the Irish compiled a 5–5 record, were outscored by a total of 180 to 171, and were ranked No. 17 in the final AP poll. In four games against ranked opponents, they lost to No. 2 Northwestern and No. 19 Georgia Tech and defeated No. 16 Iowa and No. 7 USC.

End Monty Stickles was a consensus first-team player on the 1959 All-America college football team. The team's statistical leaders included George Izo (661 passing yards), Gerry Gray (256 rushing yards), and Bob Scarpitto (297 receiving yards, 42 points scored).

The team played its home games at Notre Dame Stadium in Notre Dame, Indiana.

== Schedule ==
Date	Opponent	Rank	Site	Result	Attendance	Source
September 26	North Carolina		Notre Dame Stadium; Notre Dame, IN (rivalry)	W 28–8	56,746	
October 3	at Purdue	No. 8	Ross–Ade Stadium; West Lafayette, IN (rivalry)	L 7–28	50,362	
October 10	at California		California Memorial Stadium; Berkeley, CA	W 28–6	68,500	
October 17	at Michigan State		Spartan Stadium; East Lansing, MI (rivalry)	L 0–19	73,480	
October 24	No. 2 Northwestern		Notre Dame Stadium; Notre Dame, IN (rivalry)	L 24–30	59,078	
October 31	Navy		Notre Dame Stadium; Notre Dame, IN (rivalry)	W 25–22	58,652	
November 7	No. 19 Georgia Tech		Notre Dame Stadium; Notre Dame, IN (rivalry)	L 10–14	58,575	
November 14	at Pittsburgh		Pitt Stadium; Pittsburgh, PA (rivalry)	L 13–28	52,337	
November 21	at No. 16 Iowa		Iowa Stadium; Iowa City, IA	W 20–19	58,500	
November 28	No. 7 USC		Notre Dame Stadium; Notre Dame, IN (rivalry)	W 16–6	48,684	
Rankings from AP Poll released prior to the game
