= 1959 Northwestern Wildcats football team =

American college football season

1959 Northwestern Wildcats football
- Conference: Big Ten Conference
- Record: 6–3 (4–3 Big Ten)
- Head coach: Ara Parseghian (4th season)
- Captains: James Andreotti; Ron Burton; Gene Gossage; Mike Stock
- Home stadium: Dyche Stadium

1959 Big Ten Conference football standings
	Conf.					Overall
Team	W		L		T	W		L		T
No. 6 Wisconsin $	5	–	2	–	0	7	–	3	–	0
Michigan State	4	–	2	–	0	5	–	4	–	0
Purdue	4	–	2	–	1	5	–	2	–	2
No. 13 Illinois	4	–	2	–	1	5	–	3	–	1
Northwestern	4	–	3	–	0	6	–	3	–	0
Iowa	3	–	3	–	0	5	–	4	–	0
Michigan	3	–	4	–	0	4	–	5	–	0
Indiana	2	–	4	–	1	4	–	4	–	1
Ohio State	2	–	4	–	1	3	–	5	–	1
Minnesota	1	–	6	–	0	2	–	7	–	0
$ – Conference champion; Rankings from AP Poll

The 1959 Northwestern Wildcats team represented Northwestern University during the 1959 Big Ten Conference football season. In their fourth year under head coach Ara Parseghian, the Wildcats compiled a 6–3 record (4–3 against Big Ten Conference opponents), finished in fifth place in the Big Ten, and outscored their opponents by a combined total of 174 to 134. The team rose to #2 in the AP Poll before losing three consecutive games to end the season.

== Schedule ==
Date	Opponent	Rank	Site	Result	Attendance	Source
September 26	No. 2 Oklahoma*	No. 10	Dyche Stadium; Evanston, IL	W 45–13	27,500	
October 3	at No. 5 Iowa	No. 2	Iowa Stadium; Iowa City, Iowa, IA	W 14–10	25,132	
October 10	Minnesota	No. 2	Dyche Stadium; Evanston, IL	W 6–0	56,061	
October 17	at Michigan	No. 2	Michigan Stadium; Ann Arbor, MI (rivalry)	W 20–7	67,975	
October 24	at Notre Dame*	No. 2	Notre Dame Stadium; Notre Dame, IN (rivalry)	W 30–24	59,078	
October 31	Indiana	No. 2	Dyche Stadium; Evanston, IL	W 30–13	41,296	
November 7	No. 9 Wisconsin	No. 2	Dyche Stadium; Evanston, IL	L 19–24	55,282	
November 14	at No. 19 Michigan State	No. 6	Spartan Stadium; East Lansing, MI	L 10–15	38,421	
November 21	at Illinois	No. 8	Memorial Stadium; Champaign, IL (rivalry)	L 0–28	32,390	
*Non-conference game; Rankings from AP Poll released prior to the game; Source:
