= 1959 Iowa Hawkeyes football team =

American college football season

1959 Iowa Hawkeyes football
- Conference: Big Ten Conference
- Record: 5–4 (3–3 Big Ten)
- Head coach: Forest Evashevski (8th season)
- MVP: Don Norton
- Captains: Don Norton; Ray Jauch
- Home stadium: Iowa Stadium

1959 Big Ten Conference football standings
	Conf.					Overall
Team	W		L		T	W		L		T
No. 6 Wisconsin $	5	–	2	–	0	7	–	3	–	0
Michigan State	4	–	2	–	0	5	–	4	–	0
Purdue	4	–	2	–	1	5	–	2	–	2
No. 13 Illinois	4	–	2	–	1	5	–	3	–	1
Northwestern	4	–	3	–	0	6	–	3	–	0
Iowa	3	–	3	–	0	5	–	4	–	0
Michigan	3	–	4	–	0	4	–	5	–	0
Indiana	2	–	4	–	1	4	–	4	–	1
Ohio State	2	–	4	–	1	3	–	5	–	1
Minnesota	1	–	6	–	0	2	–	7	–	0
$ – Conference champion; Rankings from AP Poll

The 1959 Iowa Hawkeyes football team was an American football team that represented the University of Iowa as a member of the Big Ten Conference during the 1959 Big Ten football season. In their eighth season under head coach Forest Evashevski, the Hawkeyes compiled a 5–4 record (3–3 in conference games), finished sixth in the Big Ten, and outscored opponents by a total of 233 to 100. They were ranked in the AP poll for most of the season (peaking at No. 5), dominating against defending PCC champion California (42–12), Michigan State (37–8), Kansas State (53–0), and Minnesota (33–0), defeating Ohio State (16–7), but losing close games to No. 2 Northwestern (10–14), No. 14 Purdue (7–14), and Notre Dame (19–20). They were dropped from the final AP poll. The victory over Minnesota was Iowa's 43rd under Evashevski, surpassing Howard Jones to become the winningest coach in Iowa history.

The 1959 Hawkeyes gained 2,151 rushing yards and 1,248 passing yards. On defense, they gave up 1,037 rushing yards and 1,098 passing yards. Iowa's average of 239 rushing yards per game ranks fourth in school history. The scoring defense also ranks fourth in Iowa history, having allowed an average of only 11.1 points per game. They also rank fifth in school history for total defense, having given up only 237.2 yards per game.

The team's statistical leaders included halfback Bob Jeter (609 rushing yards), quarterback Olen Treadway (86-of-147 passing for 1,014 yards), end Don Norton (30 receptions for 428 yards), and fullback Don Horn (42 points on seven touchdowns). Norton was selected by the Football Writers Association of America for Look magazine as a first-team All-American. Norton and Jeter received first-team All-Big Ten honors from both the AP and UPI. Norton and halfback Ray Jauch were the team captains. Norton was also selected as the team's most valuable player.

The team played its home games at Iowa Stadium in Iowa City, Iowa. Home attendance totaled 279,400 an average of 55,880 per game.

== Schedule ==
Date	Opponent	Rank	Site	TV	Result	Attendance	Source
September 26	at California*	No. 13	California Memorial Stadium; Berkeley, CA		W 42–12	45,000	
October 3	No. 2 Northwestern	No. 5	Iowa Stadium; Iowa City, IA		L 10–14	25,132	
October 10	Michigan State^{†}	No. 10	Iowa Stadium; Iowa City, IA	NBC	W 37–8	59,300	
October 17	at Wisconsin	No. 9	Camp Randall Stadium; Madison, WI		L 16–25	64,256	
October 24	at No. 14 Purdue	No. 15	Ross–Ade Stadium; West Lafayette, IN	ABC	L 7–14	47,112	
October 31	Kansas State*		Iowa Stadium; Iowa City, IA		W 53–0	45,000	
November 7	Minnesota		Iowa Stadium; Iowa City, IA (rivalry)		W 33–0	57,000	
November 14	at Ohio State	No. 16	Ohio Stadium; Columbus, OH		W 16–7	82,126	
November 21	Notre Dame*	No. 16	Iowa Stadium; Iowa City, IA		L 19–20	58,500	
*Non-conference game; ^{†}Homecoming; Rankings from AP Poll released prior to the game; Source:

== Personnel ==
=== Players ===
The following players received varsity letters for their performance on the 1959 Iowa football team:

- John Brown, halfback, No. 43, Kansas City, MO
- Richard Clark, guard, Maquoketa, IA
- Dick Clauson, end
- Roger Ewen, halfback, 175 pounds, Milford, IA
- Larry Ferguson, fullback, Madison, IL
- Bob Hain, tackle, Davenport, IA
- George Harrell, tackle, Beloit, WI
- Don Horn, fullback, 189 pounds
- Al Hinton, tackle, Saginaw, MI
- Wilburn Hollis, quarterback, sophomore
- Don Horn, fullback, No. 30, 189 pounds, Detroit
- Lloyd Humphreys, center, Chicago
- Ray Jauch, halback, senior, No. 46, 5-11, 166 pounds, Mendota, IL
- Bob Jeter, halback, senior, No. 11, 183 pounds, Weirton, WV
- Jeff Langston, end, Iowa City, IA
- Bill Lapham, center, No. 52, 230 pounds, Des Moines, IA
- Charles Lee, tackle, 221 pounds, Fair Oaks, CA
- Paul Lees, Pana, IL
- Mark Manders, guard, junior, 200 pounds, Des Moines, IA (son of Pug Manders)
- Jerry Mauren, halfback, Wyandotte, MI
- Curt Merz, end, senior, No. 82, 214 pounds, Springfield, NJ
- Ernie Mielke, tackle, Chicago
- Al Miller, end
- Tom Moore, quarterback, junior
- Eugene Mosley, fullback
- Don Norton, end, senior, No. 89, 174 pounds, Anamosa, IA
- Gerald Novack, guard, 198 pounds, Lorain, OH
- John Sawin, tackle, 204 pounds, Chicago
- Don Shipanick, guard, 180 pounds, Chicago
- Sherwyn Thorson, guard, sophomore, 6-0, 195 pounds, Fort Dodge, IA
- Olen Treadway, quarterback, junior, No. 22, 159 pounds, Muskogee, OK
- Bill Whisler, end, sopomore, 6-2, 215 pounds, Yankton, SD
- Virgil Williams, back, sophomore, 180 pounds, Omaha, NE
- Bernie Wyatt, back, junior, No. 45

=== Coaches and administrators ===
- Head coach - Forest Evashevski
- Assistant coaches - Jerry Burns, Bob Commings, Bob Flora
- Student manager - John Grier
