= George Genyk =

American football player and coach (1938–2017)

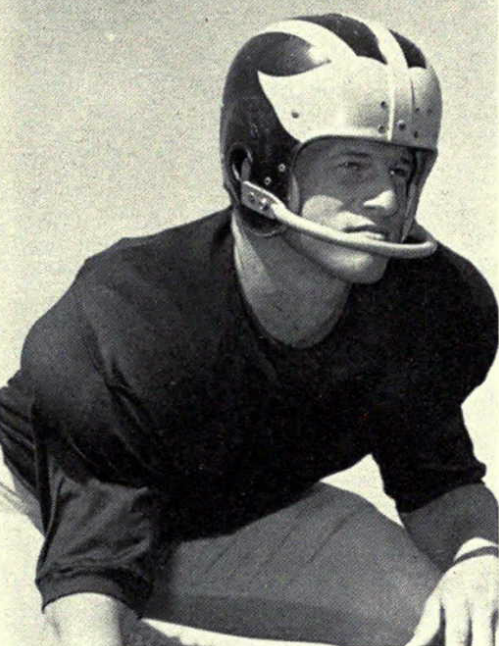
- Genyk from 1960 Michiganensian

Profile
- Positions: Guard, tackle

Personal information
- Born: June 6, 1938; Detroit, Michigan
- Died: April 29, 2017 (aged 78); Phoenix, Arizona

Career information
- College: Michigan
- NFL draft: 1960: 1st round
- AFL draft: 1960: 2nd round

George William Genyk (June 6, 1938 – April 29, 2017) was an American football lineman and coach.

Genyk played college football for the University of Michigan from 1957 to 1959 and was the captain of the 1959 Michigan team. He was drafted by the newly formed New York Titans (renamed the Jets in 1963) in the first tier 1960 American Football League draft. He coached high school football in Michigan for more than 30 years.

== Early life ==
Genyk was born and raised in Detroit, Michigan, and graduated from Pershing High School. He played on the 1953 Pershing Doughboys football team that outscored opponents 303–55 and was selected as the state's Class A football champions.

== Football career ==
=== Michigan career ===
Genyk attended the University of Michigan and played for the Michigan Wolverines football team from 1957 to 1959. In 1957, he became the second recipient of the John F. Maulbetsch Award, presented to him as the freshman football candidate for showing "desire, character, capacity for leadership and future success both on and off the gridiron." In May 1958, he also received a Yost Honor Award for combined athletic and scholastic achievement during the 1957–58 academic year.

As a junior, he started for the 1958 Michigan Wolverines football team. The 1958 team finished in eighth place in the Big Ten Conference with a disappointing 2-6-1 record. Genyk was the starting left tackle in all nine games and appeared in 246 out of the 540 minutes of play during the 1958 season. In late November 1958, after the final game had been played, the Michigan players elected Genyk as the captain of the 1959 Michigan team.

Michigan head coach Bennie Oosterbaan was fired after the 1958 season and replaced with Bump Elliott. Under the new head coach, the 1959 Wolverines improved marginally to 7th place in the Big Ten and a 4–5 record. Genyk was the starting left guard in eight of Michigan's nine games in 1959. He became known as the "Ironman" of the Michigan line, playing in 430 out of the 540 minutes in Michigan's nine football games. He missed one game after being knocked out in pregames warmups. He suffered a head wound that required several stitches.

After Michigan's 1959 season was complete, Genyk accepted an invitation to play in the North–South Shrine Game held at the Orange Bowl on December 26, 1959.

=== Professional football ===
Genyk was drafted by the New York Titans in the 1960 AFL draft. In late December 1959, Titans general manager Steve Sebo signed Genyk to a contract. It appears that Genyk was cut before the 1960 AFL season began.

=== Later career ===
After his playing career ended, Genyk worked as a head school football coach and high school teacher for over 30 years, including stints at Milan High School and Saginaw High School.

Genyk's son, Jeff Genyk, was the head football coach at Eastern Michigan University from 2004 to 2008.

Genyk died from cancer at a medical clinic in Arizona on April 29, 2017, at age 78.
