= 1959 Indiana Hoosiers football team =

American college football season

1959 Indiana Hoosiers football
- Conference: Big Ten Conference
- Record: 4–4–1 (2–4–1 Big Ten)
- Head coach: Phil Dickens (2nd season)
- MVP: Ted Aucreman
- Captain: Ted Smith
- Home stadium: Memorial Stadium

1959 Big Ten Conference football standings
	Conf.					Overall
Team	W		L		T	W		L		T
No. 6 Wisconsin $	5	–	2	–	0	7	–	3	–	0
Michigan State	4	–	2	–	0	5	–	4	–	0
Purdue	4	–	2	–	1	5	–	2	–	2
No. 13 Illinois	4	–	2	–	1	5	–	3	–	1
Northwestern	4	–	3	–	0	6	–	3	–	0
Iowa	3	–	3	–	0	5	–	4	–	0
Michigan	3	–	4	–	0	4	–	5	–	0
Indiana	2	–	4	–	1	4	–	4	–	1
Ohio State	2	–	4	–	1	3	–	5	–	1
Minnesota	1	–	6	–	0	2	–	7	–	0
$ – Conference champion; Rankings from AP Poll

The 1959 Indiana Hoosiers football team represented the Indiana Hoosiers in the 1959 Big Ten Conference football season. They participated as members of the Big Ten Conference. The Hoosiers played their home games at Memorial Stadium in Bloomington, Indiana. The team was coached by Phil Dickens, in his second year as head coach of the Hoosiers.

== Schedule ==
Date	Opponent	Site	Result	Attendance	Source
September 26	Illinois	Memorial Stadium; Bloomington, IN (rivalry)	W 20–0	18,000	
October 3	at Minnesota	Memorial Stadium; Minneapolis, MN	L 14–24	52,927	
October 10	Marquette*	Memorial Stadium; Bloomington, IN	W 33–13	30,000	
October 17	at Nebraska*	Memorial Stadium; Lincoln, NE	W 7–23	34,471	
October 24	at Michigan State	Spartan Stadium; East Lansing, MI (rivalry)	L 6–14	54,611	
October 31	at No. 2 Northwestern	Dyche Stadium; Evanston, IL	L 13–30	41,296	
November 7	at Ohio State	Ohio Stadium; Columbus, OH	T 0–0	82,075	
November 14	Michigan	Memorial Stadium; Bloomington, IN	W 26–7	24,171	
November 21	Purdue	Memorial Stadium; Bloomington, IN (Old Oaken Bucket)	L 7–20	32,325	
*Non-conference game; Rankings from AP Poll released prior to the game; Source:

== 1960 NFL draftees ==
Player	Position	Round	Pick	NFL club
Ted Aucreman	End	11	123	Detroit Lions
Vic Jones	Back	13	146	Chicago Cardinals
