= Tony Rio =

American football player (1937–1987)

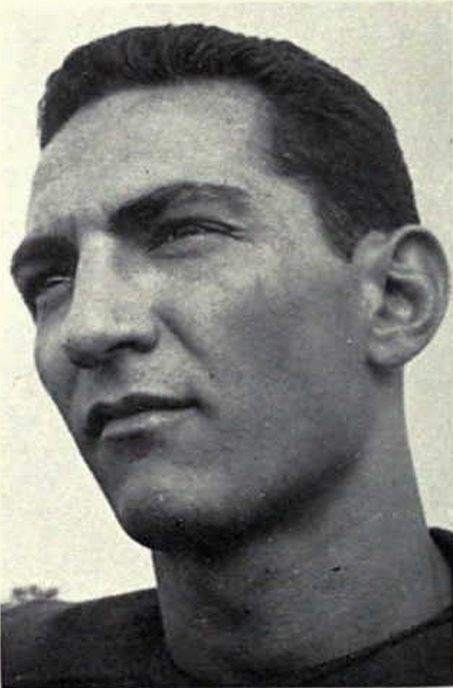
- Tony Rio, 1959

Profile
- Position: Fullback

Personal information
- Born: July 9, 1937
- Died: June 1987 (aged 49)
- Listed height: 6 ft 0 in (1.83 m)
- Listed weight: 182 lb (83 kg)

Career information
- High school: St. Philip High School (Chicago)
- College: Michigan (1957–1959)

Awards and highlights
- Most Valuable Player, 1959 Michigan Wolverines football team

Tony Rio (July 9, 1937 – June 1987) was an American football player. He played at the fullback position for the University of Michigan from 1957 to 1959. He was chosen as the Most Valuable Player on the 1959 Michigan Wolverines football team.

A native of Lombard, Illinois, he attended Chicago's St. Philip High School where he played fullback for the St. Philip Gaels football team.

Rio received a football scholarship to attend the University of Michigan and played fullback for the Michigan Wolverines football teams from 1957 to 1959. As a sophomore in 1957, Rio appeared as a back-up fullback in games against Indiana and Ohio State, gaining 33 yards in 6 carries.

As a junior in 1958, Rio played in the Wolverines' first five games, including two games as the starting fullback. He scored his first collegiate touchdown on October 11, 1958, against the Navy Midshipmen.

Two weeks after scoring his first Michigan touchdown, Rio was arrested by campus police on charges of engaging in an illegal occupation. Six other students were also arrested, including Rio's roommate, Jack Lewis, who was the captain of Michigan's basketball team, and Carl Riseman, associate sports editor of the campus newspaper. Rio was accused of being part of a "$10,000-a-week football gambling ring" involved in selling "football spot cards", in which the purchaser bet on a series of football games and won prizes if he did better than the spread on a certain number of games. Michigan's athletic director Fritz Crisler immediately suspended both Rio and Lewis from their respective teams until the criminal charges were resolved.

The story drew national media attention, including a photo-story in Life, noting that the informant, an editor at The Michigan Daily, had been hung in effigy. After initially pleading not guilty, Rio and Lewis pleaded guilty to a misdemeanor charge in November 1958 and were placed on probation by the university for the remainder of the academic year. The university announced at the time that Rio and Lewis could appear before the university's dean of men and the joint judiciary council to seek to restore their athletic eligibility, but a "high university source" said it was doubtful the two would receive "a clean bill of health." Newspapers reported that there was "only a remote possibility" that their eligibility would be restored.

In August 1959, the university restored Rio's athletic eligibility, allowing him to play football in his senior year. Bump Elliott, in his first year as Michigan's head football coach, announced that Rio had been invited to join 75 others when practice opened and added, "As far as I'm concerned the whole thing is past."

Rio responded to his reinstatement with the best year of his football career, starting all nine games at fullback for the 1959 Michigan Wolverines football team. He gained 58 yards on 12 carries in an 18-7 win over Oregon State and had a career-long 50-yard run in a 14-7 win over Minnesota. In his final game for Michigan, Rio scored two touchdowns in a 23-14 win over Ohio State. His first touchdown came 70 seconds into the game on a pass into the end zone from quarterback Stan Noskin. The second came on a one-yard run in the third quarter. At the conclusion of the 1959 season, Rio was named the Most Valuable Player on the 1959 Michigan team.

Rio tried out with the New York Titans of the newly formed American Football League in the summer of 1960, but he was cut by the Titans on July 19, 1960.

In June 1987, Rio died at age 49.
