= 1959 Illinois Fighting Illini football team =

American college football season

1959 Illinois Fighting Illini football
- Conference: Big Ten Conference

Ranking
- Coaches: No. 12
- AP: No. 13
- Record: 5–3–1 (4–2–1 Big Ten)
- Head coach: Ray Eliot (18th season)
- MVP: Bill Burrell
- Captain: Bill Burrell
- Home stadium: Memorial Stadium

1959 Big Ten Conference football standings
	Conf.					Overall
Team	W		L		T	W		L		T
No. 6 Wisconsin $	5	–	2	–	0	7	–	3	–	0
Michigan State	4	–	2	–	0	5	–	4	–	0
Purdue	4	–	2	–	1	5	–	2	–	2
No. 13 Illinois	4	–	2	–	1	5	–	3	–	1
Northwestern	4	–	3	–	0	6	–	3	–	0
Iowa	3	–	3	–	0	5	–	4	–	0
Michigan	3	–	4	–	0	4	–	5	–	0
Indiana	2	–	4	–	1	4	–	4	–	1
Ohio State	2	–	4	–	1	3	–	5	–	1
Minnesota	1	–	6	–	0	2	–	7	–	0
$ – Conference champion; Rankings from AP Poll

The 1959 Illinois Fighting Illini football team was an American football team that represented the University of Illinois as a member of the Big Ten Conference during the 1959 Big Ten season In their 18th and final year under head coach Ray Eliot, the Fighting Illini compiled a 5–3–1 record (4–2–1 in conference games), finished in a tie for third place in the Big Ten, and outscored opponents by a total of 111 to 93. They were ranked No. 13 in the final AP poll.

The team's statistical leaders included quarterback Mel Meyers (495 passing yards, 50.8% completion percentage), Bill Brown (504 rushing yards, 5.7 yards per carry), and Johnny Counts (19 receptions for 314 yards, 16.5 yards per reception). Guard Bill Burrell was selected as the team's most valuable player, received the Chicago Tribune Silver Football trophy as the Big Ten's most valuable player, and was a consensus first-team All-American. Burrell and tackle Joe Rutgens received first-team honors on the 1959 All-Big Ten Conference football team.

The team played its home games at Memorial Stadium in Champaign, Illinois.

== Schedule ==
Date	Opponent	Rank	Site	Result	Attendance	Source
September 26	at Indiana		Memorial Stadium; Bloomington, IN (rivalry)	L 0–20	18,000	
October 3	No. 4 Army*		Memorial Stadium; Champaign, IL	W 20–14	64,891	
October 10	at Ohio State	No. 20	Ohio Stadium; Columbus, OH (Illibuck)	W 9–0	82,980	
October 17	Minnesota	No. 13	Memorial Stadium; Champaign, IL	W 14–6	57,485	
October 24	vs. No. 8 Penn State*	No. 13	Cleveland Stadium; Cleveland, OH	L 9–20	15,045	
October 31	No. 11 Purdue		Memorial Stadium; Champaign, IL (rivalry)	T 7–7	42,553	
November 7	Michigan		Memorial Stadium; Champaign, IL (rivalry)	L 15–20	45,573	
November 14	at No. 7 Wisconsin		Camp Randall Stadium; Madison, WI	W 9–6	56,028	
November 21	No. 8 Northwestern		Memorial Stadium; Champaign, IL (rivalry)	W 28–0	32,390	
*Non-conference game; Rankings from AP Poll released prior to the game; Source:

== Awards and honors ==
- Bill Burrell (offensive guard)
  - Chicago Tribune Silver Football
  - Consensus All-American, (guard)
