= Bob Hollway =

American football player and coach (1926–1999)

Personal information
- Born: January 29, 1926; Ann Arbor, Michigan, U.S.
- Died: March 13, 1999 (aged 73)
- Listed height: 6 ft 3 in (1.91 m)
- Listed weight: 199 lb (90 kg)

Career information
- High school: Superior (WI) Central
- College: Michigan

Career history
- Minnesota Vikings (1967–1970) Assistant coach/defensive line coach/defensive coordinator; St. Louis Cardinals (1971–1972) Head coach; Detroit Lions (1973–1974) Assistant coach; San Francisco 49ers (1975) Assistant coach; Seattle Seahawks (1976–1977) Defensive coordinator; Minnesota Vikings (1978–1985) Defensive coordinator

Awards and highlights
- NFL champion (1969); National champion (1948)

Head coaching record
- Regular season: NFL: 8–18–2 (.321)
- Coaching profile at Pro Football Reference

Robert Condon Hollway (January 29, 1926 – March 13, 1999) was an American football player and coach. He played college football for the University of Michigan and was a member of Michigan's undefeated 1947 and 1948 teams. He thereafter served as an assistant at the University of Maine (1951–1952), Eastern Michigan University (1953), Michigan (1954–1965) before joining the NFL with the Minnesota Vikings (1967–1970, 1978–1986), as the head coach of the National Football League (NFL)'s St. Louis Cardinals (1971–1972), and assistant coaching stints with the Detroit Lions (1973–1974), San Francisco 49ers (1975), and Seattle Seahawks (1976–1977).

== College career ==
Hollway was born and raised in Ann Arbor, Michigan. He was the son of longtime Pioneer High School athletic teacher Lou Hollway, the namesake of the school's football stadium, Hollway Field. Bob Hollway attended the University of Michigan, playing at the end position for the Michigan Wolverines football teams from 1947 to 1949.

After graduating in 1950, Hollway entered the coaching ranks the following year as an assistant at the University of Maine. After two seasons, he returned to the state of Michigan as both an assistant football and head basketball coach at Eastern Michigan University in 1953. From 1954 to 1965, he was an assistant football coach at the University of Michigan.

== NFL career ==
On January 22, 1966, Hollway announced he was resigning to enter private business, but that time away, which included doing radio commentary on Wolverine games, lasted only one season before he came back as defensive line coach of the National Football League's Minnesota Vikings under new head coach Bud Grant. During his first season with the team, he helped shape a group of linemen who became known as the "Purple People Eaters," including two future Hall of Famers in Carl Eller and rookie Alan Page. Over the next three years, Hollway was promoted to defensive coordinator.

Four years of success, including an appearance in Super Bowl IV, raised Hollway's profile and led to his hiring as head coach of the Cardinals on February 12, 1971. However, the team was unable to beat out either the Dallas Cowboys or the resurgent Washington Redskins over the next two seasons, with Hollway paying the price with his dismissal on December 18, 1972, one day after the end of the 1972 NFL season. The Cardinals finished 4–9–1 in both of Hollway's seasons with the Cardinals, as the team suffered through numerous injuries and inconsistent play at quarterback, as Hollway shuffled between Jim Hart, Pete Beathard and Gary Cuozzo with little success, despite the presence of fleet wide receiver John Gilliam (who was traded to Minnesota in 1972) and future Pro Football Hall of Fame tight end Jackie Smith.

In February 1973, Hollway was hired a Detroit Lions' assistant coach under Don McCafferty. However, McCafferty died suddenly during the team's 1974 training camp, and Hollway resigned as the lions secondary coach in January 1975. In 1975, Hollway became the defensive backs coach for the San Francisco 49ers. In January 1976, after 49ers head coach Dick Nolan was replaced, Hollway became defensive backfield coach with the expansion Seattle Seahawks, where he reunited with former Viking assistant Jack Patera, the expansion team's first head coach.

In April 1978, Hollway resigned to again serve as defensive coordinator of the Minnesota Vikings, but became involved in controversy when the Seahawks claimed the Vikings had tampered with him while still under contract.

Following the retirement of Grant at the conclusion of the 1983 NFL season, Hollway was demoted by Les Steckel to quality control assistant, serving primarily as a personnel director and scout.

Hollway died in 1999 at the age of 73.

Hollway's son Michael retired in 2011 after serving as the head football coach at Ohio Wesleyan University in Delaware, Ohio for 25 years. His son Bruce was a managing partner for John Hancock Financial Network in Maple Grove, Minnesota. Bruce died in 2020.
