= Bennie McRae =

American football player (1939–2012)

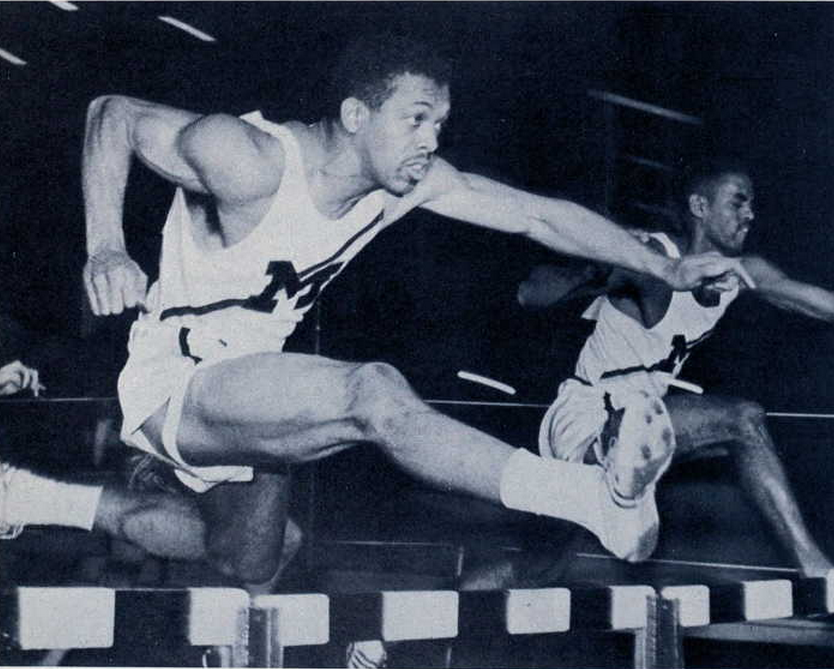

No. 26
- Position: Cornerback

Personal information
- Born: December 8, 1939; Aberdeen, North Carolina, U.S.
- Died: November 22, 2012 (aged 72); Columbia, Maryland, U.S.
- Listed height: 6 ft 0 in (1.83 m)
- Listed weight: 180 lb (82 kg)

Career information
- High school: Huntington (Newport News, Virginia)
- College: Michigan (1959–1961)
- NFL draft: 1962: 2nd round, 21st overall pick
- AFL draft: 1962: 8th round, 62nd overall pick

Career history
- Chicago Bears (1962–1970); New York Giants (1971)

Awards and highlights
- NFL champion (1963); Second-team All-Pro (1965); 100 greatest Bears of All-Time; Third-team All-American (1961); First-team All-Big Ten (1961)

Career NFL statistics
- Interceptions: 27
- Interception yards: 485
- Fumble recoveries: 6
- Defensive touchdowns: 4
- Stats at Pro Football Reference

Benjamin Prince McRae (December 8, 1939 – November 22, 2012) was an American football cornerback who played for 10 seasons in the National Football League (NFL), primarily with the Chicago Bears. He played college football as a halfback for the Michigan Wolverines from 1959 to 1961 and was selected by the Bears in the second round of the 1962 NFL draft.

== Early life ==
McRae was born in Aberdeen, North Carolina, in 1939. He attended Collis P. Huntington High School in Newport News, Virginia.

== University of Michigan ==
McRae enrolled at the University of Michigan in 1958 and played college football at the halfback position for head coach Bump Elliott's Michigan Wolverines football teams from 1959 to 1961. In November 1961, McRae demonstrated his versatility, scoring three touchdowns—on a five-yard run, a 15-yard reception, and a 34-yard interception return—in a 28–14 victory over Duke. In three years at Michigan, he rushed for 1,037 yards on 231 carries for an average of 4.5 yards per carry. He also had 411 receiving yards, 465 yards on 24 kickoff returns and 171 yards on 29 punt returns.

McRae was also a star track athlete at Michigan, competing in both the high and low hurdles. He won four Big Ten Conference hurdle championships and was ranked as one of the top 10 hurdlers in the world in 1961 by Track and Field News. He was inducted into the University of Michigan Athletic Hall of Honor in 2002.

== Professional football ==
McRae was selected by the Chicago Bears in the second round (21st overall pick) of the 1962 NFL draft. He signed with the Bears in June 1962, and went on to play nine seasons for the Bears from 1962 to 1970, principally at the cornerback position. In October 1966, McRae was named the NFL's Defensive Player of the Week after intercepting two Johnny Unitas passes and knocking down several others to lead the Bears to an upset victory over the Baltimore Colts. One of his interceptions was made seven yards into the end zone and was followed by a 53-yard runback. In nine seasons with the Bears, McRae had 27 interceptions, including six during the 1963 NFL season. He also held the Bears' franchise record with four interceptions returned for touchdowns.

In September 1971, the Bears traded McRae and Bob Hyland to the New York Giants in exchange for the Giants' No. 1 pick in the 1972 NFL draft. McRae appeared in eight games for the Giants during the 1971 NFL season.

== Later life ==
After retiring from football, McRae went into the construction business as the proprietor of McRae Construction Co. in Newport News. In 1973, he left the contracting business to focus on developing plans for housing projects.

McRae was married, and he and his wife, Suzanne, had seven children. McRae died in 2012 due to an illness at age 72.

== See also ==
- University of Michigan Athletic Hall of Honor
