= 1959 Ohio State Buckeyes football team =

American college football season

1959 Ohio State Buckeyes football
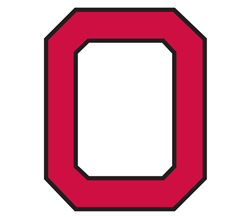
- Conference: Big Ten Conference
- Record: 3–5–1 (2–4–1 Big Ten)
- Head coach: Woody Hayes (9th season)
- MVP: Jim Houston
- Captain: Jim Houston
- Home stadium: Ohio Stadium

1959 Big Ten Conference football standings
	Conf.					Overall
Team	W		L		T	W		L		T
No. 6 Wisconsin $	5	–	2	–	0	7	–	3	–	0
Michigan State	4	–	2	–	0	5	–	4	–	0
Purdue	4	–	2	–	1	5	–	2	–	2
No. 13 Illinois	4	–	2	–	1	5	–	3	–	1
Northwestern	4	–	3	–	0	6	–	3	–	0
Iowa	3	–	3	–	0	5	–	4	–	0
Michigan	3	–	4	–	0	4	–	5	–	0
Indiana	2	–	4	–	1	4	–	4	–	1
Ohio State	2	–	4	–	1	3	–	5	–	1
Minnesota	1	–	6	–	0	2	–	7	–	0
$ – Conference champion; Rankings from AP Poll

The 1959 Ohio State Buckeyes football team was an American football team that represented the Ohio State University as a member of the Big Ten Conference during the 1959 Big Ten season. In their ninth year under head coach Woody Hayes, the Buckeyes compiled a 3–5–1 record (2–4–1 in conference games), tied for eighth place in the Big Ten, and were outscored by a total of 114 to 83. They were ranked No. 7 at the start of the season, but lost games against No. 11 USC, No. 20 Illinois, No. 12 Wisconsin, No. 15 Iowa, and unranked Michigan.

The team's statistical leaders included quarterback Tom Matte (439 passing yards, 54.9% completion percentage); fullback Bob Ferguson (371 rushing yards, 6.1 yards per carry); and end Jim Houston (11 receptions for 214 yards). Houston received first-team honors from the AP and UPI on the 1959 All-Big Ten Conference football team.

The team played its home games at ohio Stadium in Columbus, Ohio.

== Schedule ==
Date	Opponent	Rank	Site	Result	Attendance	Source
September 26	Duke*	No. 12	Ohio Stadium; Columbus, OH	W 14–13	82,834	
October 2	at No. 11 USC*	No. 14	Los Angeles Memorial Coliseum; Los Angeles, CA	L 0–17	49,592	
October 10	No. 20 Illinois		Ohio Stadium; Columbus, OH (Illibuck)	L 0–9	82,980	
October 17	No. 6 Purdue		Ohio Stadium; Columbus, OH	W 15–0	83,391	
October 24	at No. 12 Wisconsin	No. 20	Camp Randall Stadium; Madison, WI	L 3–12	55,440	
October 31	Michigan State		Ohio Stadium; Columbus, OH	W 30–24	83,130	
November 7	Indiana		Ohio Stadium; Columbus, OH	T 0–0	82,075	
November 14	No. 16 Iowa		Ohio Stadium; Columbus, OH	L 7–16	82,126	
November 21	at Michigan		Michigan Stadium; Ann Arbor, MI (rivalry)	L 14–23	90,093	
*Non-conference game; Rankings from AP Poll released prior to the game; Source:

== Game summaries ==
=== Duke ===
Team	1	2	3	4	Total
Duke	0	0	0	13	13
• Ohio State	7	0	0	7	14

- Date: September 26
- Location: Ohio Stadium
- Game attendance: 82,834
- Game weather: Clear, 83 °F (28 °C)

Scoring summary
Q1	OSU	Ferguson 15 yard run (Kilgore kick)	OSU 7–0
Q4	DUKE	Wilson 3 yard run (pass failed)	OSU 7–6
Q4	DUKE	McGee 1 yard run (Browning kick)	DUKE 7–13
Q4	OSU	Matte 22 yard pass to Bryant (Kilgore kick)	OSU 14–13

=== USC ===
Team	1	2	3	4	Total
Ohio State	0	0	0	0	0
• Southern California	0	9	0	8	17

- Date: October 2
- Location: Memorial Coliseum, Los Angeles
- Game attendance: 49,592
- Game weather: Clear, 60 °F (16 °C)

Scoring summary
Q2	USC	Zachik 27 yard field goal	USC 0–3
Q2	USC	Charles 38 yard pass to Hayes (kick field)	USC 0–9
Q4	USC	Charles 4 yard run (Charles to Wilder pass good)	USC 0–17

=== Illinois ===
Team	1	2	3	4	Total
• Illinois	6	0	0	3	9
Ohio State	0	0	0	0	0

- Date: October 10
- Location: Ohio Stadium
- Game attendance: 82,980
- Game weather: Clear, 68 °F (20 °C)

Scoring summary
Q1	ILL	Meyers 73 yard pass to Counts (kick failed)	ILL 0–6
Q4	ILL	Roberts 25 yard field goal	ILL 0–9

=== Purdue ===
Team	1	2	3	4	Total
Purdue	0	0	0	0	0
• Ohio State	3	9	0	3	15

- Date: October 17
- Location: Ohio Stadium
- Game attendance: 83,391
- Game weather: Cloudy, 58 °F (14 °C)

Scoring summary
Q1	OSU	Kilgore 36 yard field goal	OSU 3–0
Q2	OSU	Team safety	OSU 5–0
Q2	OSU	Fields punt return (Kilgore kick)	OSU 12–0
Q4	OSU	Kilgore 35 yard field goal	OSU 15–0

=== Wisconsin ===
Team	1	2	3	4	Total
Ohio State	0	3	0	0	3
• Wisconsin	9	3	0	0	12

- Date: October 24
- Location: Camp Randall Stadium, Madison, WI
- Game attendance: 55,440
- Game weather: Rain, wind 30-40 mph, 39 °F (4 °C)

Scoring summary
Q1	WIS	Hackbart 7 yard run (Holzwarth kick)	WIS 0–7
Q1	WIS	Team safety	WIS 0–9
Q1	OSU	Kilgore 27 yard field goal	WIS 3–9
Q4	WIS	Holzwarth 27 yard field goal	Wis 3–12

=== Indiana ===
Team	1	2	3	4	Total
Indiana	0	0	0	0	0
Ohio State	0	0	0	0	0

- Date: November 7
- Location: Ohio Stadium
- Game attendance: 82,075
- Game weather: Cloudy, 36 °F (2 °C)

Scoring summary

Ohio State: 127 yards total offense; 5 first downs; 8 punts for 333 yards; missed FGs from 58 and 50 yards

Indiana: 179 yards total offense; 11 first downs; 7 punts for 290 yards

=== Iowa ===
Team	1	2	3	4	Total
Iowa	7	0	0	0	7
• Ohio State	6	0	0	10	16

- Date: MONTHDAY
- Location: Ohio Stadium
- Game attendance: 82,126
- Game weather: Cloudy, 37 °F (3 °C)

Scoring summary
Q1	IOWA	Hollis 13 yard pass to Whiskr (kick failed)	IOWA 0–6
Q1	OSU	Detrick 1 yard run (Kilgore kick)	OSU 7–6
Q4	IOWA	Moore 26 yard field goal	IOWA 7–9
Q4	IOWA	Mauren 4 yard run (Moore kick)	IOWA 7–16

== Coaching staff ==
- Woody Hayes - Head Coach - 9th year

== 1960 pro draftees ==
Player	Draft	Round	Pick	Position	NFL club
Jim Houston	NFL	1	8	Linebacker	Cleveland Browns
Jim Marshall	NFL	4	44	Defensive End	Cleveland Browns
Bob White	NFL	8	91	Fullback	Cleveland Browns
