= 1959 Minnesota Golden Gophers football team =

American college football season

1959 Minnesota Golden Gophers football
- Conference: Big Ten Conference
- Record: 2–7 (1–6 Big Ten)
- Head coach: Murray Warmath (6th season)
- MVP: Tom Moe
- Captain: Michael W. Wright
- Home stadium: Memorial Stadium

1959 Big Ten Conference football standings
	Conf.					Overall
Team	W		L		T	W		L		T
No. 6 Wisconsin $	5	–	2	–	0	7	–	3	–	0
Michigan State	4	–	2	–	0	5	–	4	–	0
Purdue	4	–	2	–	1	5	–	2	–	2
No. 13 Illinois	4	–	2	–	1	5	–	3	–	1
Northwestern	4	–	3	–	0	6	–	3	–	0
Iowa	3	–	3	–	0	5	–	4	–	0
Michigan	3	–	4	–	0	4	–	5	–	0
Indiana	2	–	4	–	1	4	–	4	–	1
Ohio State	2	–	4	–	1	3	–	5	–	1
Minnesota	1	–	6	–	0	2	–	7	–	0
$ – Conference champion; Rankings from AP Poll

The 1959 Minnesota Golden Gophers football team represented the University of Minnesota in the 1959 Big Ten Conference football season. In their sixth year under head coach Murray Warmath, the Golden Gophers compiled a 2–7 record and were outscored by their opponents by a combined total of 159 to 98.

End Tom Moe received the team's Most Valuable Player award. Tackle Michael W. Wright was named an Academic All-American and Academic All-Big Ten. Offensive lineman Jerome Shetler was also named Academic All-Big Ten.

Total attendance at five home games was 263,983, an average of 52,796 per game. The largest crowd was against Michigan.

== Schedule ==
Date	Opponent	Site	Result	Attendance	Source
September 26	Nebraska*	Memorial Stadium; Minneapolis, MN (rivalry)	L 12–32	50,951	
October 3	Indiana	Memorial Stadium; Minneapolis, MN	W 24–14	52,927	
October 10	at No. 2 Northwestern	Dyche Stadium; Evanston, IL	L 0–6	56,061	
October 17	at No. 13 Illinois	Memorial Stadium; Champaign, IL	L 6–14	57,485	
October 24	Michigan	Memorial Stadium; Minneapolis, MN (Little Brown Jug)	L 6–14	57,354	
October 31	Vanderbilt*^{†}	Memorial Stadium; Minneapolis, MN	W 20–6	49,284	
November 7	at Iowa	Iowa Stadium; Iowa City, IA (rivalry)	L 0–33	57,000	
November 14	at Purdue	Ross–Ade Stadium; West Lafayette, IN	L 23–29	34,655	
November 21	No. 9 Wisconsin	Memorial Stadium; Minneapolis, MN (rivalry)	L 7–11	53,647	
*Non-conference game; ^{†}Homecoming; Rankings from AP Poll released prior to the game; Source:
