= 1960 NFL draft =

National Football League draft

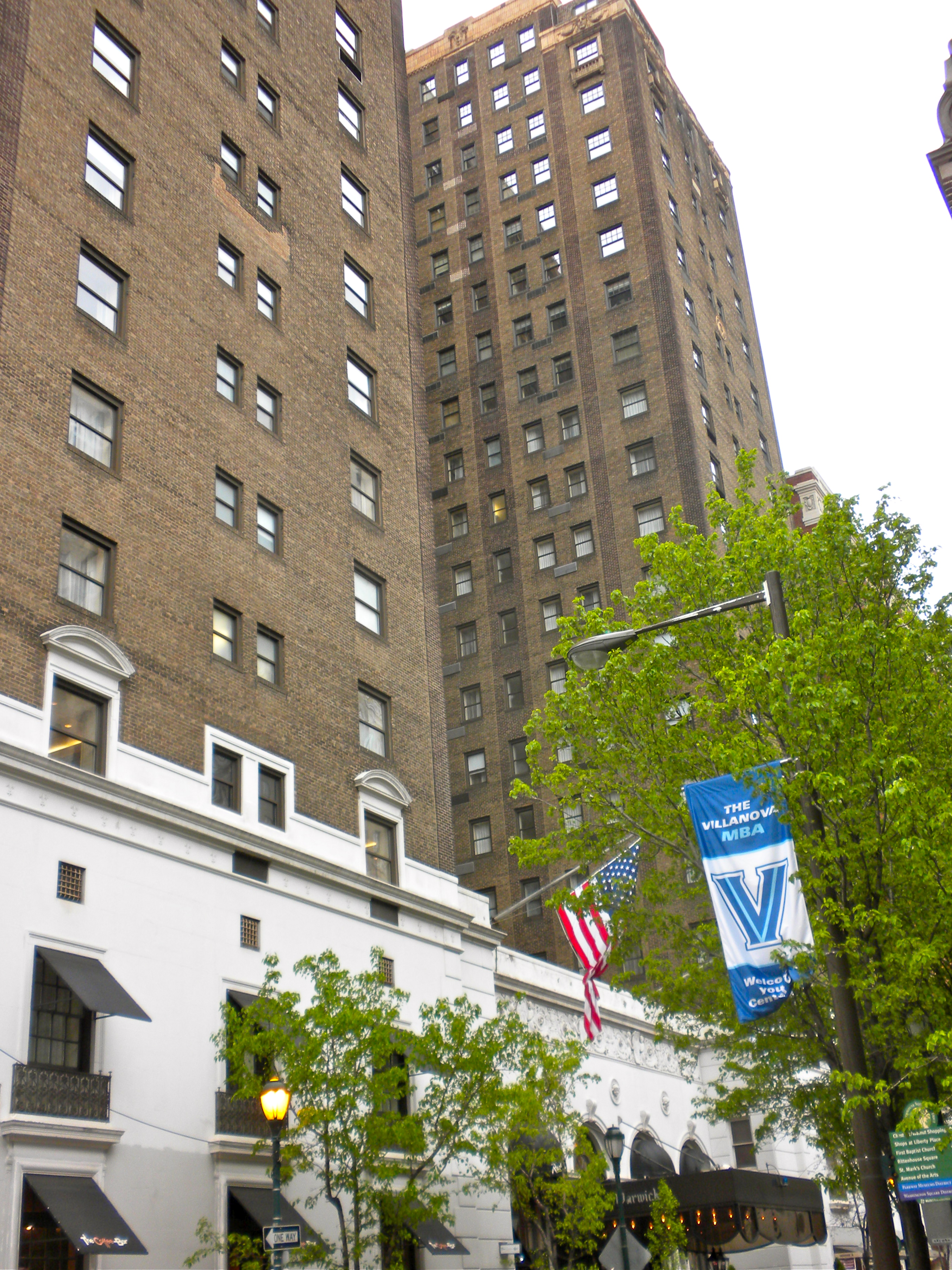
- The Warwick (location of the draft), photographed in 2010

General information
- Date: November 30, 1959
- Location: Warwick Hotel in Philadelphia, Pennsylvania

Overview
- 240 total selections in 20 rounds
- League: NFL
- First selection: Billy Cannon, RB; Los Angeles Rams
- Mr. Irrelevant: Bill Gorman, T New York Giants
- Most selections (26): Los Angeles Rams
- Fewest selections (17): Green Bay Packers; Pittsburgh Steelers
- Hall of Famers: 5: S Johnny Robinson; OT Ron Mix; DB Larry Wilson; C Jim Otto; S Willie Wood

The 1960 NFL draft in which NFL teams take turns selecting amateur college American football players and other first-time eligible players, was held at the Warwick Hotel in Philadelphia on November 30, 1959. Many players, including half of those drafted in the first round, signed with teams in the newly created American Football League, including the first overall pick and Heisman Trophy winner Billy Cannon. At the time of the draft, the Cardinals were still the Chicago Cardinals; they moved to St. Louis in March 1960. The Dallas Cowboys were enfranchised in January 1960 after the draft.

== Player selections ==
= Pro Bowler	= AFL All-Star	= Hall of Famer

=== Round 1 ===
Pick no.	NFL team	Player	Position	College
1	Los Angeles Rams	Billy Cannon	Running back	LSU
2	Chicago Cardinals ^{(became St. Louis Cardinals after this draft)}	George Izo	Quarterback	Notre Dame
3	Detroit Lions	Johnny Robinson	Safety	LSU
4	Washington Redskins	Richie Lucas	Quarterback	Penn State
5	Green Bay Packers	Tom Moore	Running back	Vanderbilt
6	Pittsburgh Steelers	Jack Spikes	Running back	Texas Christian
7	Chicago Bears	Roger Davis	Guard	Syracuse
8	Cleveland Browns	Jim Houston	Defensive end	Ohio State
9	Philadelphia Eagles	Ron Burton	Running back	Northwestern
10	Baltimore Colts	Ron Mix	Offensive tackle	USC
11	San Francisco 49ers	Monty Stickles	End	Notre Dame
12	New York Giants	Lou Cordileone	Defensive tackle	Clemson

=== Round 2 ===
Pick #	NFL team	Player	Position	College
13	Chicago Cardinals	Harold Olson	Tackle	Clemson
14	Chicago Cardinals	Mike McGee	Guard	Duke
15	Detroit Lions	Warren Rabb	Quarterback	Louisiana State
16	San Francisco 49ers	Mike Magac	Guard	Missouri
17	Green Bay Packers	Bob Jeter	Halfback	Iowa
18	Cleveland Browns	Larry Stephens	Tackle	Texas
19	Cleveland Browns	Prentice Gautt	Running back	Oklahoma
20	Philadelphia Eagles	Maxie Baughan	Linebacker	Georgia Tech
21	Washington Redskins	Sam Horner	Halfback	Virginia Military Inst
22	San Francisco 49ers	Carl Kammerer	Guard	Pacific
23	Baltimore Colts	Don Floyd	Tackle	Texas Christian
24	Baltimore Colts	Marvin Terrell	Guard	Mississippi

=== Round 3 ===
Pick #	NFL team	Player	Position	College
25	Los Angeles Rams	Charley Britt	Quarterback	Georgia
26	Chicago Cardinals	Hugh McInnis	End	Southern Mississippi
27	Detroit Lions	Bob Scholtz	Center	Notre Dame
28	Washington Redskins	Andy Stynchula	Tackle	Penn State
29	Chicago Cardinals	Charley Ellzey	Center	Southern Mississippi
30	Los Angeles Rams	Pervis Atkins	Running back	New Mexico State
31	Philadelphia Eagles	Curt Merz	End	Iowa
32	Chicago Bears	Don Meredith	Quarterback	Southern Methodist
33	Cleveland Browns	Ross Fichtner	Defensive back	Purdue
34	Baltimore Colts	Jim Welch	Defensive back	Southern Methodist
35	San Francisco 49ers	Rod Breedlove	Guard	Maryland
36	New York Giants	Jim Leo	Defensive end	Cincinnati

=== Round 4 ===
Pick #	NFL team	Player	Position	College
37	Chicago Cardinals	Willie West	Halfback	Oregon
38	Chicago Cardinals	Silas Woods	End	Marquette
39	Detroit Lions	Jim Andreotti	Center	Northwestern
40	Philadelphia Eagles	Ted Dean	Running back	Wichita State
41	Cleveland Browns	Johnny Brewer	Tight end	Mississippi
42	Detroit Lions	Roger Brown	Tackle	Maryland-Eastern Shore
43	Chicago Bears	Billy Martin	Back	Minnesota
44	Cleveland Browns	Jim Marshall	Tackle	Ohio State
45	Philadelphia Eagles	Jack Cummings	Quarterback	North Carolina
46	San Francisco 49ers	Ray Norton	Halfback	San Jose State
47	Baltimore Colts	Gerhard Schwedes	Running back	Syracuse
48	Washington Redskins	Vince Promuto	Guard	Holy Cross

=== Round 5 ===
Pick #	NFL team	Player	Position	College
49	Los Angeles Rams	Charlie Janerette	Tackle	Penn State
50	Chicago Cardinals	Bill Burrell	Linebacker	Illinois
51	Green Bay Packers	Dale Hackbart	Back	Wisconsin
52	Washington Redskins	Don Stallings	Tackle	North Carolina
53	Cleveland Browns	Bob Jarus	Running back	Purdue
54	Chicago Cardinals	George Phelps	Back	Cornell College (IA)
55	Pittsburgh Steelers	Abner Haynes	Running back	North Texas State
56	Philadelphia Eagles	Don Norton	End	Iowa
57	Chicago Bears	Dick Norman	Quarterback	Stanford
58	Baltimore Colts	Marv Lasater	Back	Texas Christian
59	San Francisco 49ers	Len Rohde	Tackle	Utah State
60	St. Louis Cardinals	Ed Mazurek	Tackle	Xavier

=== Round 6 ===
Pick #	NFL team	Player	Position	College
61	Chicago Cardinals	Jacky Lee	Quarterback	Cincinnati
62	Los Angeles Rams	Jerry Stalcup	Guard	Wisconsin
63	Detroit Lions	Gail Cogdill	Wide receiver	Washington State
64	Washington Redskins	Dave Hudson	End	Florida
65	Green Bay Packers	Mike Wright	Tackle	Minnesota
66	Los Angeles Rams	Don Ellersick	End	Washington State
67	Philadelphia Eagles	Emmett Wilson	Tackle	Georgia Tech
68	Chicago Bears	Ed Kovac	Back	Cincinnati
69	Cleveland Browns	Bob Khayat	Guard/placekicker	Mississippi
70	San Francisco 49ers	Lee Murchison	End	Pacific
71	Baltimore Colts	Al Bansavage	Guard	USC
72	New York Giants	George Blair	Back	Mississippi

=== Round 7 ===
Pick #	NFL team	Player	Position	College
73	Los Angeles Rams	Ron Morrison	Tackle	New Mexico
74	Chicago Cardinals	Larry Wilson	Safety	Utah
75	Detroit Lions	Jim Norton	Wide receiver	Idaho
76	Pittsburgh Steelers	Leonard Wilson	Back	Purdue
77	Green Bay Packers	Kirk Phares	Guard	South Carolina
78	Pittsburgh Steelers	Lonnie Dennis	Guard	Brigham Young
79	Chicago Bears	Charlie Bivins	Running back	Morris Brown
80	Cleveland Browns	Taz Anderson	Running back	Georgia Tech
81	Philadelphia Eagles	John Wilkins	Tackle	USC
82	Baltimore Colts	Jerry Beabout	Tackle	Purdue
83	San Francisco 49ers	Bobby Waters	Quarterback	Presbyterian
84	New York Giants	Bob Yates	Tackle	Syracuse

=== Round 8 ===
Pick #	NFL team	Player	Position	College
85	Chicago Cardinals	Wayne Crow	Halfback	California
86	Los Angeles Rams	Carroll Dale	Wide receiver	Virginia Tech
87	Washington Redskins	Earl Kohlhaas	Guard	Penn State
88	San Francisco 49ers	Bill Mathis	Halfback	Clemson
89	Green Bay Packers	Don Hitt	Center	Oklahoma State
90	Pittsburgh Steelers	Dan Lanphear	Tackle	Wisconsin
91	Cleveland Browns	Bob White	Back	Ohio State
92	Philadelphia Eagles	Monte Lee	End	Texas
93	Chicago Bears	Pete Manning	End	Wake Forest
94	San Francisco 49ers	Max Fugler	Center	Louisiana State
95	Baltimore Colts	Jim "Rocky" Colvin	Tackle	Houston
96	New York Giants	Fred Hageman	Center	Kansas

=== Round 9 ===
Pick #	NFL team	Player	Position	College
97	Los Angeles Rams	Marv Luster	End	UCLA
98	Chicago Cardinals	Dewitt Hoopes	Tackle	Northwestern
99	Detroit Lions	Max Messner	Tackle	Cincinnati
100	Washington Redskins	Dwight Bumgamer	End	Duke
101	Green Bay Packers	Frank Brixius	Tackle	Minnesota
102	Pittsburgh Steelers	Marshall Harris	Guard	Texas Christian
103	Baltimore Colts	Bob Hall	Tackle	Army
104	Chicago Bears	Ken Kirk	Center	Mississippi
105	Cleveland Browns	Chris Burford	Wide receiver	Stanford
106	Baltimore Colts	Don Perkins	Back	New Mexico
107	San Francisco 49ers	Bobby Wasden	End	Auburn
108	New York Giants	Bob Anderson	Halfback	Army

=== Round 10 ===
Pick #	NFL team	Player	Position	College
109	Chicago Cardinals	Charley Johnson	Quarterback	New Mexico State
110	Los Angeles Rams	Curtis McClinton	Running back	Kansas
111	Detroit Lions	Grady Alderman	Tackle	Detroit
112	Baltimore Colts	Ernie Barnes	Tackle	North Carolina Central
113	St. Louis Cardinals	Paul Oglesby	Tackle	UCLA
114	Pittsburgh Steelers	John Kapele	Tackle	Brigham Young
115	Pittsburgh Steelers	Arvie Martin	Center	Texas Christian
116	Cleveland Browns	Clyde Washington	Halfback	Purdue
117	Detroit Lions	Jim O'Brien	Tackle	Boston College
118	San Francisco 49ers	Mel Branch	Defensive end	Louisiana State
119	Baltimore Colts	Bobby Boyd	Cornerback	Oklahoma
120	New York Giants	Bob Simms	End	Rutgers

=== Round 11 ===
Pick #	NFL team	Player	Position	College
121	Los Angeles Rams	Ken Young	Running back	Valparaiso
122	Chicago Cardinals	Bobby Towns	Halfback	Georgia
123	Detroit Lions	Ted Aucreman	End	Indiana
124	Washington Redskins	Jim Eifrid	Center	Colorado State
125	Green Bay Packers	Ron Ray	Tackle	Howard Payne
126	San Francisco 49ers	Ed Pitts	Tackle	South Carolina
127	Cleveland Browns	Bobby Franklin	Safety	Mississippi
128	Chicago Bears	Stan Fanning	Tackle	Idaho
129	Chicago Bears	Glenn Shaw	Running back	Kentucky
130	Baltimore Colts	Bob Wehking	Center	Florida
131	San Francisco 49ers	Ernie Hansen	Center	Northern Arizona
132	New York Giants	Dale Rems	Tackle	Purdue

=== Round 12 ===
Pick #	NFL team	Player	Position	College
133	Chicago Cardinals	Tom Chapman	End	Detroit
134	Los Angeles Rams	Doug Pat Brown	Guard	Fresno State
135	Detroit Lions	Dave Ross	End	Cal State–Los Angeles
136	Washington Redskins	Jim Crotty	Halfback	Notre Dame
137	Green Bay Packers	Harry Ball	Tackle	Boston College
138	Pittsburgh Steelers	Earl Butler	Tackle	North Carolina
139	Philadelphia Eagles	Dave Grosz	Quarterback	Oregon
140	Chicago Bears	Tom Budrewicz	Tackle	Brown
141	Cleveland Browns	Rich Mostardi	Back	Kent State
142	San Francisco 49ers	Jim Williams	Guard	North Carolina
143	Baltimore Colts	Bill Bucek	Halfback	Rice
144	New York Giants	Pete Hall	Quarterback	Marquette

=== Round 13 ===
Pick #	NFL team	Player	Position	College
145	Los Angeles Rams	James Jones	End	Southern Methodist
146	Chicago Cardinals	Vic Jones	Halfback	Indiana
147	Detroit Lions	Pete Tuney	Halfback	Occidental
148	Washington Redskins	Bill Herron	End	Georgia
149	Green Bay Packers	Paul Winslow	Back	North Carolina Central
150	Pittsburgh Steelers	Joe Womack	Running back	Cal State-Los Angeles
151	Chicago Bears	Bob Spada	End	Duke
152	Cleveland Browns	Dick Grecni	Center	Ohio
153	Philadelphia Eagles	Dave Graham	End	Virginia
154	Baltimore Colts	Jim Nemeth	Center	South Carolina
155	San Francisco 49ers	Dean Hinshaw	Tackle	Stanford
156	New York Giants	Jim Varnado	Running back	Southern

=== Round 14 ===
Pick #	NFL team	Player	Position	College
157	Chicago Cardinals	Bob DeMarco	Tackle	Dayton
158	Los Angeles Rams	Harold Stanger	Center	North Texas State
159	Detroit Lions	Jim Glasgow	Tackle	Jacksonville State
160	Washington Redskins	Charlie Milstead	Back	Texas A&M
161	Green Bay Packers	Jon Gilliam	Center	East Texas State
162	Pittsburgh Steelers	Brady Keys	Defensive back	Colorado State
163	Cleveland Browns	Bill Dumbauld	Tackle	West Virginia
164	Philadelphia Eagles	Ray Petersen	Back	West Virginia
165	Chicago Bears	Jim Sorey	Tackle	Texas Southern
166	San Francisco 49ers	Gary Campbell	Back	Whittier
167	Baltimore Colts	Dale Johannsen	Tackle	Augustana (SD)
168	New York Giants	Doug Cline	Running back	Clemson

=== Round 15 ===
Pick #	NFL team	Player	Position	College
169	Los Angeles Rams	Harry Rakowski	Center	The Citadel
170	Chicago Cardinals	Frank Mestnik	Running back	Marquette
171	Detroit Lions	Darrell Harper	Halfback	Michigan
172	Washington Redskins	Bernie Darre	Guard	Tulane
173	Green Bay Packers	Garney Henley	Back	Huron
174	Pittsburgh Steelers	Larry Essenmacker	Tackle	Alma
175	Philadelphia Eagles	John Wilcox	Tackle	Oregon
176	Chicago Bears	Warren Lashua	Back	Whitworth
177	Cleveland Browns	Tom Watkins	Running back	Iowa State
178	Baltimore Colts	Larry Grantham	End	Mississippi
179	San Francisco 49ers	Mike Dowdle	Back	Texas
180	New York Giants	Walter Beach	Defensive back	Central Michigan

=== Round 16 ===
Pick #	NFL team	Player	Position	College
181	Chicago Cardinals	Jim Lee "Earthquake" Hunt	Tackle	Prairie View A&M
182	Los Angeles Rams	Don Kacmarek	Tackle	North Dakota
183	Detroit Lions	Steve Rasso	Back	Cincinnati
184	Washington Redskins	Joe Kulbacki	Back	Purdue
185	Green Bay Packers	John B. Littlejohn	Back	Kansas State
186	Pittsburgh Steelers	Dave Ames	Back	Richmond
187	Chicago Bears	John "Bo" Farrington	End	Prairie View A&M
188	Cleveland Browns	Jim Walden	Quarterback	Wyoming
189	Philadelphia Eagles	Larry Lancaster	Tackle	Georgia
190	San Francisco 49ers	Jim Heinke	Tackle	Wisconsin
191	Baltimore Colts	George Boynton	Back	North Texas State
192	New York Giants	Bill Beck	Tackle	Gustavus Adolphus

=== Round 17 ===
Pick #	NFL team	Player	Position	College
193	Los Angeles Rams	Emanuel Congedo	End	Villanova
194	Chicago Cardinals	Joe Davis	Tackle	The Citadel
195	Detroit Lions	Bob Hudson	End	Louisiana Tech
196	Washington Redskins	Billy Roland	Guard	Georgia
197	Green Bay Packers	Joe Gomes	Back	South Carolina
198	Pittsburgh Steelers	Dale Chamberlain	Running back	Miami (OH)
199	Cleveland Browns	Lovell Coleman	Back	Western Michigan
200	Philadelphia Eagles	Mike Graney	End	Notre Dame
201	Chicago Bears	Jim Hanna	End	USC
202	Baltimore Colts	Jim Beaver	Tackle	Florida
203	San Francisco 49ers	Austin "Goose" Gonsoulin	Defensive back	Baylor
204	New York Giants	Dave Baker	End	Syracuse

=== Round 18 ===
Pick #	NFL team	Player	Position	College
205	Chicago Cardinals	Bob Haas	Halfback	Missouri
206	Los Angeles Rams	Tom Gates	Back	San Bernardino Valley
207	Detroit Lions	Frank Walton	Halfback	John Carroll
208	Washington Redskins	John Lawrence	Guard	North Carolina State
209	Green Bay Packers	Royce Whittington	Tackle	Southwestern Louisiana
210	Pittsburgh Steelers	Charley Lee	Tackle	Iowa
211	Philadelphia Eagles	Emory Turner	Guard	Purdue
212	Chicago Bears	Claude King	Back	Houston
213	Cleveland Browns	Jack Hanlon	Back	Pennsylvania
214	San Francisco 49ers	Carl Robinson	Tackle	South Carolina State
215	Baltimore Colts	Dan Sheehan	Tackle	Tennessee-Chattanooga
216	New York Giants	Tony Polychronis	Tackle	Utah

=== Round 19 ===
Pick #	NFL team	Player	Position	College
217	Los Angeles Rams	Jim Boeke	Tackle	Heidelberg
218	Chicago Cardinals	Herman Alexander	Tackle	Findlay
219	Detroit Lions	Gene Prebola	End	Boston University
220	Washington Redskins	Ron Maltony	Guard	Purdue
221	Green Bay Packers	Rich Brooks	End	Purdue
222	Pittsburgh Steelers	Howard Turley	End	Louisville
223	Chicago Bears	Lloyd Roberts	Tackle	Georgia
224	Cleveland Browns	Jack Campbell	End	Toledo
225	Philadelphia Eagles	Bob Hain	Tackle	Iowa
226	Baltimore Colts	Bill Carpenter	End	Army
227	San Francisco 49ers	Bobby Pate	Back	Presbyterian
228	New York Giants	Jim Webster	Halfback	Marquette

=== Round 20 ===
Pick #	NFL team	Player	Position	College
229	Chicago Cardinals	Tom Day	Guard	North Carolina A&T
230	Los Angeles Rams	Royce Shelton	Halfback	Stephen F. Austin
231	Detroit Lions	Dean Look	Quarterback	Michigan State
232	Washington Redskins	Jimmy Wolf	Halfback	Panhandle State
233	Green Bay Packers	Gilmer Lewis	Tackle	Oklahoma
234	Pittsburgh Steelers	George Hershberger	Tackle	Wichita State
235	Cleveland Browns	Bob Nelson	Center	Wisconsin
236	Philadelphia Eagles	Ramon Armstrong	Guard	Texas Christian
237	Chicago Bears	Angelo Coia	Back	USC
238	San Francisco 49ers	Jim Woodward	Tackle	Lamar
239	Baltimore Colts	Bob Hogue	Tackle	Shepherd
240	New York Giants	Bill Gorman	Tackle	McMurry

= Pro Bowler	= AFL All-Star	= Hall of Famer

== Hall of Famers ==
- Larry Wilson, defensive back from University of Utah taken 7th round 74th overall by the Chicago Cardinals.

Inducted: Professional Football Hall of Fame class of 1978.

- Ron Mix, offensive tackle from USC taken 1st round 10th overall by the Baltimore Colts, but signed with the Los Angeles Chargers of the AFL.

Inducted: Professional Football Hall of Fame class of 1979.

- Jim Otto, center from University of Miami (Florida) signed undrafted by the Oakland Raiders of the AFL

Inducted: Professional Football Hall of Fame class of 1980

- Willie Wood, safety from USC signed undrafted by Green Bay Packers

Inducted: Professional Football Hall of Fame class of 1989

- Johnny Robinson, safety from LSU taken 1st round 3rd overall by the Detroit Lions, but signed with the Dallas Texans of the AFL.

Inducted: Professional Football Hall of Fame class of 2019

== Notable undrafted players ==
^{†}	= Pro Bowler	‡	= Hall of Famer

Original NFL team	Player	Pos.	College	Notes
Green Bay Packers	Willie Wood^{‡}	S	USC	
Green Bay Packers	Ken Iman	C	Southeast Missouri State	
Green Bay Packers	Dick Pesonen	CB	Minnesota–Duluth	
Los Angeles Rams	Danny Villanueva	K/P	New Mexico State	
Pittsburgh Steelers	Charley Scales	RB	Indiana	
Pittsburgh Steelers	Fred Williamson ^{†}	S	Northwestern	
Washington Redskins	Bob Whitlow	C	Arizona	

== See also ==
- 1960 NFL expansion draft
- 1960 American Football League draft
