= Ron Ray =

American gridiron football player

Profile
- Position: Tackle

Personal information
- Born: 1933 or 1934 (age 92–93)
- Listed height: 6 ft 4 in (1.93 m)
- Listed weight: 245 lb (111 kg)

Career information
- NFL draft: 1960: 11th round, 125th overall pick
- AFL draft: 1960

Career history
- 1960–1963: Hamilton Tiger-Cats

Awards and highlights
- Grey Cup champion (1963)

Ron Ray (born c. 1934) was a Canadian football player who played for the Hamilton Tiger-Cats. He won the Grey Cup with them in 1963. He played college football at Howard Payne University in Brownwood, Texas. After his retirement in 1964, he moved to Detroit, Michigan where he owned a furniture business.
