= Charley Ellzey =

American football player (1938–2014)

No. 55
- Positions: Center, linebacker

Personal information
- Born: February 17, 1938; Meridian, Mississippi, U.S.
- Died: January 27, 2014 (aged 75); Cookeville, Tennessee, U.S.
- Listed height: 6 ft 3 in (1.91 m)
- Listed weight: 240 lb (109 kg)

Career information
- High school: Meridian
- College: Mississippi Southern (1956–1959)
- NFL draft: 1960: 3rd round, 29th overall pick

Career history
- St. Louis Cardinals (1960–1961)

Awards and highlights
- Small college national champion (1958)
- Stats at Pro Football Reference

Charles Melvin Ellzey Jr. (February 17, 1938 – January 27, 2014) was an American professional football player for the St. Louis Cardinals of the National Football League (NFL). He played college football for the Mississippi Southern Southerners and was selected by the Cardinals in the third round of the 1960 NFL draft.

== Early life ==
Charles Melvin Ellzey Jr. was born on February 17, 1938, in Meridian, Mississippi. He attended Meridian High School, graduating in 1956.

== College career ==
Ellzey enrolled at Mississippi Southern College to play college football for the Southerners as a center on offense and linebacker on defense. He was on the freshman team in 1956 and was a three-year varsity letterman from 1957 to 1959. He was a backup in 1957 and a starter from 1958 to 1959. The 1958 team went 9–0 and were named UPI small college national champions. Ellzey was inducted into the school's athletics hall of fame in 2003.

== Professional career ==
Ellzey was selected by the St. Louis Cardinals in the third round, with the 29th overall pick, of the 1960 NFL draft and by the Dallas Texans in the second selections portion of the 1960 AFL draft. He chose to sign with the Cardinals on December 3, 1959. He played in nine or eleven games, starting one, for the Cardinals during the 1960 season. Ellzey broke his ankle on November 27, 1960, against the Cleveland Browns.

Ellzey only appeared in five games in 1961 due to injury. On August 25, 1962, it was reported that he would sit out the 1962 season to give his injury time to heal while also serving as the University of Southern Mississippi's freshman football coach.

== Personal life ==
Ellzey coached football at Gulfport High School in Gulfport, Mississippi, for six years. He was a salesman for the Houston based-Flexitallic Gasket Co. for over 20 years until retiring in 1994. In 2006, he moved from Gulfport to Cookeville, Tennessee. Ellzey died on January 27, 2014, at Cookeville Regional Medical Center.
