= Harold Olson =

American football player (born 1938)

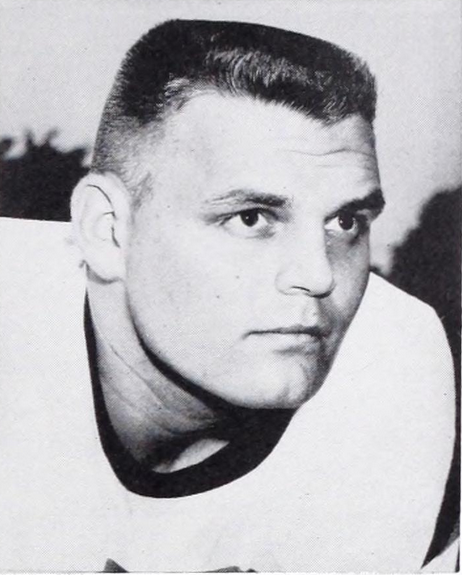
- Olson at Clemson in 1959

No. 74, 76
- Position: Offensive tackle

Personal information
- Born: January 19, 1938 (age 88); Asheville, North Carolina, U.S.
- Listed height: 6 ft 2 in (1.88 m)
- Listed weight: 255 lb (116 kg)

Career information
- High school: Decatur (GA) Southwest DeKalb
- College: Clemson
- NFL draft: 1960: 2nd round, 13th overall pick
- AFL draft: 1960: 1st round

Career history
- Buffalo Bills (1960-1962); Denver Broncos (1963-1964)

Awards and highlights
- First-team All-Pro (1962); AFL All-Star (1961); Second-team All-ACC (1959)

Career AFL statistics
- Games played: 70
- Games started: 55
- Stats at Pro Football Reference

Harold Vincent Olson (born January 19, 1938) is an American former professional football player who was an offensive tackle in the American Football League (AFL) for the Buffalo Bills and the Denver Broncos. Olson made the AFL Pro Bowl team in 1961 and was named first-team All-Pro in 1962.

Olson played college football for the Clemson Tigers, including playing in the 1959 Sugar Bowl against Louisiana State University. Olson was inducted into the Clemson Athletic Hall of Fame in 2010.

== See also ==
- Other American Football League players
