= Dave Graham (American football) =

American football player (born 1939)

No. 78
- Position: Offensive tackle

Personal information
- Born: February 1, 1939 (age 87); Bridgeport, Connecticut, U.S.
- Listed height: 6 ft 3 in (1.91 m)
- Listed weight: 250 lb (113 kg)

Career information
- High school: Fairfield (CT) Ludlowe
- College: Virginia
- NFL draft: 1960: 13th round, 153rd overall pick
- AFL draft: 1960

Career history
- Philadelphia Eagles (1963–1969)

Awards and highlights
- Second-team All-ACC (1962)

Career NFL statistics
- Games played: 83
- Games started: 31
- Fumble recoveries: 2
- Stats at Pro Football Reference

David Elliott Graham (born February 1, 1939) is an American former professional football player who was an offensive tackle for six seasons with the Philadelphia Eagles of the National Football League (NFL). He played college football for the Virginia Cavaliers. After his six seasons in the NFL, he became a high school principal in Markham, Fauquier County, Virginia.
