= 1958 All-Atlantic Coast Conference football team =

American college football all-star team

The 1958 All-Atlantic Coast Conference football team consists of American football players chosen by various selectors for their All-Atlantic Coast Conference ("ACC") teams for the 1958 college football season. Selectors in 1958 included the Associated Press (AP) and the United Press International (UPI). Players selected to the first team by both the AP and UPI are displayed below in bold.

== All-Atlantic Coast selections ==
=== Ends ===
- **Al Goldstein**, North Carolina (AP-1; UPI-1)
- Ray Masneri, Clemson (AP-1)
- Ben Scotti, Maryland (UPI-1)
- Pete Manning, Wake Forest (AP-2)
- John Schroeder, North Carolina (AP-2)
- Bob Pepe, North Carolina State (UPI-2)
- Bert Lattimore, Duke (UPI-2)

=== Tackles ===
- **Phil Blazer**, North Carolina (AP-1; UPI-1)
- Ed Pitts, South Carolina (AP-1; UPI-2)
- Jim Padgett, Clemson (UPI-1; AP-2)
- Fred Cole, Maryland (AP-2; UPI-2)

=== Guards ===
- **Mike McGee**, Duke (AP-1; UPI-1) (College Football Hall of Fame)
- Rod Breedlove, Maryland (AP-1; UPI-2)
- Bill Rearick, North Carolina State (UPI-1; AP-2)
- Fred Swearingen, North Carolina (AP-2)
- Joe Rodri, North Carolina State (UPI-2)

=== Centers ===
- Bill Thomas, Clemson (AP-1; UPI-2)
- Ronnie Koes, North Carolina (UPI-1; AP-2)

=== Backs ===
- **Jack Cummings**, North Carolina (AP-1 [QB]; UPI-1)
- **Wray Carlton**, Duke (AP-1; UPI-1)
- **Alex Hawkins**, South Carolina (AP-1; UPI-1)
- Wade Smith, North Carolina (AP-1 [HB]; UPI-2)
- John Saunders, South Carolina (UPI-1)
- Norm Snead, Wake Forest (AP-2)
- Harvey White, Clemson (AP-2; UPI-2)
- Don Klochak, North Carolina (AP-2; UPI-2)
- Sonny Randle, Virginia (AP-2)
- Neil MacLean, Wake Forest (UPI-2)

== Key ==
AP = Associated Press

UPI = United Press International

== See also ==
- 1958 College Football All-America Team
