= Al Bansavage =

American football player (1938–2003)

No. 57, 53
- Position: Linebacker

Personal information
- Born: January 9, 1938; Jersey City, New Jersey, U.S.
- Died: August 19, 2003 (aged 65); Jupiter, Florida, U.S.
- Listed height: 6 ft 2 in (1.88 m)
- Listed weight: 220 lb (100 kg)

Career information
- High school: Union Hill (Union City, NJ)
- College: USC
- NFL draft: 1960: 6th round, 71st overall pick
- AFL draft: 1960

Career history
- Los Angeles Chargers (1960); Oakland Raiders (1961)

Awards and highlights
- Second-team All-PCC (1959)

Career AFL statistics
- Games played: 17
- Stats at Pro Football Reference

Albert Anthony Bansavage (January 9, 1938 – August 19, 2003) was an American professional football linebacker who played in the American Football League (AFL).

== Early life ==
Bansavage prepped at Union Hill High School in Union City, New Jersey.

== College career ==
Bansavage played college football at The Citadel and at Southern California. He waived his final year of eligibility to sign with the Baltimore Colts after being selected in the 1960 AFL draft.

== Professional career ==
Bansavage played professionally in the American Football League for the Los Angeles Chargers in 1960 and the AFL's Oakland Raiders in 1961. He was at the center of a controversy in the 1960 season when the Raiders asked to have a game they lost to the Chargers forfeited due to Bansavage being an ineligible player.

== Personal life ==
Bansavage died on August 19, 2003. He had three sons and a wife named Helen.

== See also ==
- List of American Football League players
