= Glenn Shaw =

American football player (born 1938)

No. 29, 34, 32
- Position: Fullback

Personal information
- Born: July 11, 1938 (age 88); Paducah, Kentucky, U.S.
- Listed height: 6 ft 2 in (1.88 m)
- Listed weight: 220 lb (100 kg)

Career information
- High school: Paducah Tilghman
- College: Kentucky
- NFL draft: 1960: 11th round, 129th overall pick
- AFL draft: 1960

Career history
- Chicago Bears (1960); Los Angeles Rams (1962); San Francisco 49ers (1963)*; Oakland Raiders (1963-1964)
- * Offseason or practice squad member only

Career NFL/AFL statistics
- Rushing yards: 148
- Rushing average: 3.1
- Receptions: 8
- Receiving yards: 146
- Total touchdowns: 4
- Stats at Pro Football Reference

Glenn Shaw (born July 11, 1938) is an American former professional football player who was a fullback in the National Football League (NFL) and American Football League (AFL). He played college football for the Kentucky Wildcats. Shaw for the Chicago Bears in 1960, the Los Angeles Rams in 1962 and for the Oakland Raiders from 1963 to 1964.
