= Lou Cordileone =

American football player (born 1937)

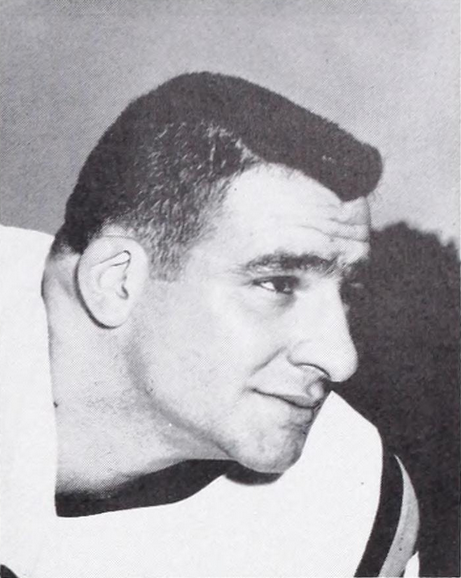
- Cordileone at Clemson in 1959

No. 51, 74, 79, 87
- Positions: Guard, defensive tackle, defensive end

Personal information
- Born: August 4, 1937 (age 89); Jersey City, New Jersey, U.S.
- Listed height: 6 ft 1 in (1.85 m)
- Listed weight: 250 lb (113 kg)

Career information
- High school: Union City (NJ) St. Michael's
- College: Clemson
- NFL draft: 1960: 1st round, 12th overall pick
- AFL draft: 1960

Career history
- New York Giants (1960); San Francisco 49ers (1961); Los Angeles Rams (1962); Pittsburgh Steelers (1962–1963); Rhode Island Indians (1965); New Orleans Saints (1967–1968)

Awards and highlights
- Third-team All-American (1959); First-team All-ACC (1959)

Career NFL statistics
- Fumble recoveries: 3
- Interceptions: 1
- Sacks: 9
- Stats at Pro Football Reference

Louis Anthony Cordileone (born August 4, 1937) is an American former professional football player who was an offensive lineman, primarily guard, who in nine years played six seasons in the National Football League (NFL), for five different teams. He played college football for the Clemson Tigers and was selected in the first round (twelfth overall) of the 1960 NFL draft.

Cordileone is best known for being traded in 1961 from the New York Giants to the San Francisco 49ers for quarterback Y. A. Tittle. At the time, Tittle was 34 years old and a 4-time Pro Bowler. Cordileone was quoted as reacting "Me, even up for Y. A. Tittle? You're kidding", and later remarked that the Giants traded him for "a 42-year-old quarterback".

His stay in San Francisco was short-lived, as he went to the Rams in 1962, where he played only 2 games, before moving to Pittsburgh, playing 26 games until the end of the 1963 season. After a 3-year hiatus, he joined the expansion team New Orleans Saints for their first two seasons, 1967 and 1968, as offensive guard and defensive tackle. In his last season, he fumbled once, and returned an interception for 7 yards, after having recovered three fumbles in his first two pro seasons.

In 2013 Cordileone starred in the TV Land reality show Forever Young.
