= Gorden Kelley =

American football player (1938–2015)

- Kelley in 1961

No. 83, 51, 41
- Position: Linebacker

Personal information
- Born: June 11, 1938; Decatur, Georgia, U.S.
- Died: October 22, 2015 (aged 77); Highland Beach, Florida, U.S.
- Listed height: 6 ft 3 in (1.91 m)
- Listed weight: 230 lb (104 kg)

Career information
- College: Georgia
- AFL draft: 1960

Career history
- 1960–1961: San Francisco 49ers
- 1962–1963: Washington Redskins
- 1965: Edmonton Eskimos

Career NFL statistics
- Games played: 51
- Starts: 42
- Interceptions: 4
- Fumble recoveries: 1
- Stats at Pro Football Reference

Gorden Bond Kelley (June 11, 1938 – October 22, 2015) was an American professional football player who was a linebacker in the National Football League for the San Francisco 49ers and the Washington Redskins. He played college football for the Georgia Bulldogs.

He was married to Charlotte and had two children, son Gordon Jr. and daughter Mary. The son played college football in Virginia. After retirement, he worked in real estate as well as owning a furniture store in Ocean Ridge, Florida.
