= Vernon Cole =

American gridiron football player (1938–1972)

Profile
- Position: Quarterback

Personal information
- Born: May 26, 1938; Pilot Point, Texas, U.S.
- Died: June 23, 1972 (aged 34); Waco, Texas, U.S.
- Listed height: 6 ft 1 in (1.85 m)
- Listed weight: 190 lb (86 kg)

Career information
- College: North Texas
- AFL draft: 1960

Career history
- 1960: Winnipeg Blue Bombers
- 1964: Montreal Alouettes

Francis Vernon Cole (May 26, 1938 – June 23, 1972) was an American professional football player who played for the Winnipeg Blue Bombers. He played college football at the University of North Texas. He died in 1972 after a long illness.
