= Pete Manning (gridiron football) =

American gridiron football player (1937–2019)

No. 86, 74, 70, 34, 45
- Position: Defensive back

Personal information
- Born: August 11, 1937; Hudson, Massachusetts, U.S.
- Died: January 5, 2019 (aged 81); Worcester, Massachusetts, U.S.
- Listed height: 6 ft 3 in (1.91 m)
- Listed weight: 208 lb (94 kg)

Career information
- High school: Hudson
- College: Wake Forest
- NFL draft: 1960: 8th round, 93rd overall pick
- AFL draft: 1960

Career history
- Chicago Bears (1960–1961); Calgary Stampeders (1962–1965); Toronto Argonauts (1966–1967); Toronto Rifles (1967); Norfolk Neptunes (1967)

Awards and highlights
- 3× CFL Western All-Star (1962-1964); First-team All-ACC (1959); Second-team All-ACC (1958)
- Stats at Pro Football Reference

Peter Jonathan Manning (August 11, 1937 – January 5, 2019) was an American professional football player who played for the Chicago Bears, Calgary Stampeders and Toronto Argonauts. He played college football at Wake Forest University in North Carolina.
