= Charlie Milstead =

American football player (1937–2022)

No. 12
- Positions: Quarterback, defensive back

Personal information
- Born: November 21, 1937; Tyler, Texas, U.S.
- Died: February 17, 2022 (aged 84)
- Listed height: 6 ft 2 in (1.88 m)
- Listed weight: 190 lb (86 kg)

Career information
- High school: John Tyler (Tyler)
- College: Texas A&M
- NFL draft: 1960: 14th round, 160th overall pick
- AFL draft: 1960

Career history
- Houston Oilers (1960-1961)

Awards and highlights
- 2× AFL champion (1960, 1961); First-team All-SWC (1958); Second-team All-SWC (1959)

Career NFL statistics
- Passing yards: 43
- Interceptions: 2
- Punts: 66
- Punting yards: 2,365
- Stats at Pro Football Reference

Charles Frank Milstead (November 21, 1937 – February 17, 2022) was an American professional football player who was a quarterback and defensive back for the Houston Oilers of the American Football League (AFL). He played college football at Texas A&M University and was drafted 160th overall in the fourteenth round of the 1960 NFL draft by the Washington Redskins.

== Career ==
Milstead played 22 games in his career, having minimal time as quarterback while spending time as a punter and defensive back. He threw seven career passes and had four completions for 43 yards. On defense, he had two interceptions. As a rusher, he ran for three yards on three carries. He had 66 punts for 2,365 yards for a 35.8 yard average. His punts and punting yards were both fourth in the league in 1960. In addition, Milstead kicked an extra point in a game against the Oakland Raiders on September 9th, 1961.

== Personal life and death ==
He died on February 17, 2022, at the age of 84.
