= Jim Andreotti =

American gridiron football player (1938–2022)

Profile
- Positions: Guard, Linebacker

Personal information
- Born: March 27, 1938; Chicago, Illinois, U.S.
- Died: May 10, 2022 (aged 84); Naples, Florida, U.S.
- Listed height: 6 ft 1 in (1.85 m)
- Listed weight: 200 lb (91 kg)

Career information
- AFL draft: 1960

Career history
- 1960–1962: Toronto Argonauts
- 1963–1966: Montreal Alouettes
- 1967: Toronto Argonauts

Awards and highlights
- 4× CFL East All-Star (1960, 1961, 1962, 1963); First-team All-American (1959); First-team All-Big Ten (1959); Second-team All-Big Ten (1958)

James P. Andreotti (March 27, 1938 – May 10, 2022) was an American Canadian football player who played for the Toronto Argonauts and Montreal Alouettes.

== Biography ==
Andreotti was born in Illinois and was a letter winner in college football at Northwestern University, where he was also an All-American, first-team All-Big Ten and Northwestern's Most Valuable Player. He was drafted in the 1960 NFL draft by the Detroit Lions (Round 4, #39).

Andreotti died on May 10, 2022.
