= Pete Hall =

American football player (born 1939)

No. 12
- Position: End

Personal information
- Born: February 28, 1939 (age 87); Farrell, Pennsylvania, U.S.
- Listed height: 6 ft 2 in (1.88 m)
- Listed weight: 200 lb (91 kg)

Career information
- College: Marquette
- NFL draft: 1960: 12th round, 144th overall pick
- AFL draft: 1960

Career history
- New York Giants (1961); Toronto Argonauts (1962)

Career NFL statistics
- Receptions: 2
- Receiving yards: 22
- Stats at Pro Football Reference

Clyde Pete Hall (born February 28, 1939) is a former player in the National Football League (NFL). He was drafted in the twelfth round of the 1960 NFL draft by the New York Giants and later played with the team during the 1961 NFL season.

== Personal life ==
While playing football for the Giants, Hall appeared on the November 13, 1961 episode of the CBS gameshow To Tell the Truth, posing as an imposter for Hank Ballard.

After football, Hall became a financial analyst. However, what Hall truly did was enter a life of crime, being arrested numerous times for possession of cocaine and general con artist schemes. He was arrested in 2010 for investment fraud after stealing more than four million dollars from investors, and his wife was arrested along with him for the scheme. He spent over a decade defrauding people. Hall had defrauded investors with fake letters from big banks, stole $80,000 from an ex-wife, and filed phony bankruptcy claims. For this crime, he was sentenced to 20 years in prison.

He was also arrested in the past for wire fraud and other offenses. Hall was released from prison into home confinement due to the pandemic, and while in home confinement he arranged for a cocaine deal with undercover agents and was arrested once again in his apartment in April 2021.

Hall's son, Alexander, was sentenced to 15 years in prison in 2007 for shooting at and murdering a random passerby in anger after getting kicked out of a club for smoking.
