= David Ames (American football) =

American football player (1937–2009)

No. 25, 22, 44
- Positions: Halfback, defensive back

Personal information
- Born: January 16, 1937; Portsmouth, Virginia, U.S.
- Died: August 4, 2009 (aged 72); Richmond, Virginia, U.S.
- Listed height: 6 ft 0 in (1.83 m)
- Listed weight: 185 lb (84 kg)

Career information
- High school: Woodrow Wilson (Portsmouth)
- College: Richmond
- NFL draft: 1960: 16th round, 186th overall pick
- AFL draft: 1960

Career history
- New York Titans (1961); Denver Broncos (1961); Richmond Rebels (1964-1965)

Career AFL statistics
- Rushing yards: 114
- Rushing average: 6
- Receptions: 6
- Receiving yards: 20
- Interceptions: 1
- Stats at Pro Football Reference

David Randolph Ames (January 16, 1937 – August 4, 2009) was an American professional football player who was a defensive back and halfback. He played college football for the Richmond Spiders, and played professionally in the American Football League (AFL) for the New York Titans and the Denver Broncos in 1961. He was drafted by the National Football League (NFL)'s Pittsburgh Steelers in the 1960 NFL draft. Ames died from Lou Gehrig's disease (ALS).

== See also ==
- List of American Football League players
