= Bob Scholtz =

American football player (born 1937)

No. 50, 55
- Position: Offensive lineman

Personal information
- Born: December 25, 1937 (age 88); Watertown, South Dakota, U.S.
- Listed height: 6 ft 4 in (1.93 m)
- Listed weight: 250 lb (113 kg)

Career information
- High school: Tulsa (OK) Marquette Catholic
- College: Notre Dame
- NFL draft: 1960: 3rd round, 27th overall pick
- AFL draft: 1960: 1st round

Career history
- Detroit Lions (1960–1964); New York Giants (1965–1966); New Orleans Saints (1966)

Career NFL statistics
- Games played: 81
- Games started: 59
- Fumble recoveries: 3
- Stats at Pro Football Reference

Robert Joseph Scholtz (born December 25, 1937) is an American former professional football player who was an offensive lineman in the National Football League (NFL). He was selected in the third round (27th overall) by the Detroit Lions in the 1960 NFL draft after playing college football for the Notre Dame Fighting Irish. He played seven seasons for the Lions, New York Giants, and New Orleans Saints in the NFL.
