= Vince Promuto =

American football player (1938–2021)

No. 65
- Position: Guard

Personal information
- Born: June 8, 1938; New York, New York, U.S.
- Died: June 1, 2021 (aged 82); Pompano Beach, Florida U.S.
- Listed height: 6 ft 1 in (1.85 m)
- Listed weight: 245 lb (111 kg)

Career information
- High school: Mount St. Michael (Bronx, New York)
- College: Holy Cross
- NFL draft: 1960: 4th round, 48th overall pick
- AFL draft: 1960

Career history
- Washington Redskins (1960–1970)

Awards and highlights
- 2× Pro Bowl (1963, 1964); 80 Greatest Redskins; Washington Commanders Ring of Fame; Second-team All-Eastern (1959)

Career NFL statistics
- Games played: 130
- Games started: 113
- Fumble recoveries: 8
- Stats at Pro Football Reference

Vincent Louis Promuto (June 8, 1938 – June 1, 2021) was an American professional football player who was a guard for the Washington Redskins (now Washington Commanders) in the National Football League (NFL). He was later a Drug Enforcement Administration official.

== Early life and college ==
Promuto was born on June 8, 1938, in New York City, and grew up in the Pelham Bay section of The Bronx. He was a tough kid who was in a neighborhood gang in the 1950s.

Promuto did not begin to play football until he was a high school junior at Mount St. Michael Academy. On November 14, 2024, he was posthumously inducted into the Mount St. Michael Academy Athletic Hall of Fame, joining NFL Hall of Famers Bill Polian and Art Donovan, among others. Donovan's and Promuto's NFL careers overlapped in 1960-1961, when Donovan was still a defensive tackle for the Baltimore Colts and Promuto an offensive lineman for Washington. Their teams met on September 25,1960 and November 26, 1961.

He played college football at the College of the Holy Cross. He was a starter from his sophomore through senior years. He was first-team All-New England and an honorable mention All-America as a senior. He once recovered eight fumbles in a single game, against rival Boston College. While at Holy Cross, Promuto also starred on the track team, graduating with the school shot put record.

In 1977, Promuto was inducted into the Holy Cross Varsity Club Hall of Fame. In 2010, he was an inaugural member of the Crusader Football Legends Ring of Honor in 2010.

== Professional football career ==
Promuto was drafted by Washington in the fourth round of the 1960 NFL draft (the 48th overall pick). He played guard for Washington from 1960 to 1970. He played 130 games in his career, starting 113, all with Washington. He was a Pro Bowl selection in 1963 and 1964. He was a pass blocker for Hall of Fame quarterback Sonny Jurgenson.

In 1969, when the legendary Vince Lombardi became Washington's head coach for one season, Promuto was named a team captain. It was the team's first winning season (7-5-2) in 14 years. After George Allen became coach in 1971, he wanted Promuto to continue playing, but Promuto was not physically up to continuing his career, and retired.

In 1968, he received the Outstanding Redskin Award, and in 2002, he was named one of Washington's 70 greatest all-time players. In 2010, he was made a member of the Washington Commanders Ring of Fame.

== Legal, government and business career ==
Encouraged by team owner and prominent lawyer Edward Bennett Williams, Promuto attended American University Law School during his playing career, graduating with distinction. He was a law clerk for a federal judge and was an Assistant United States Attorney.

When the U.S. Drug Enforcement Agency (USDEA) was created, he became its first Director of Public Affairs. The USDEA terminated him in 1976, a decision he successfully appealed, winning an order of reinstatement, back pay, and clearing his record. The USDEA appealed that decision though it did reinstate him (while refusing him back pay). The case ultimately settled, with Promuto receiving his back pay, resigning (after his reinstatement), and withdrawing a Freedom of Information Act request for documents. He was leaving in any event, but wanted to clear his name first. Promuto eventually left the law and government altogether, to take over his father's sanitation business in the Bronx. He expanded the business significantly until it was acquired by Waste Management in the 1990s. He won the first bid in New York for moving waste by rail; thus, reducing truck emissions in the process.

== Retirement and death ==
Promuto moved to Ft. Lauderdale, Florida in 1992, after a successful business career. He and his wife owned a 90 ft yacht, and he became a licensed yacht captain.

He died of congestive heart failure on June 1, 2021, in Pompano Beach, Florida, one week before his 83rd birthday.
