= Ken Kirk =

American football player (1938–2009)

No. 53, 37, 51
- Position: Linebacker

Personal information
- Born: February 26, 1938; Nashville, Tennessee, U.S.
- Died: November 16, 2009 (aged 71); Tupelo, Mississippi, U.S.
- Listed height: 6 ft 2 in (1.88 m)
- Listed weight: 230 lb (104 kg)

Career information
- High school: Tupelo
- College: Ole Miss
- NFL draft: 1960: 9th round, 104th overall pick
- AFL draft: 1960

Career history
- Chicago Bears (1960–1961); Pittsburgh Steelers (1962); Los Angeles Rams (1963)

Career NFL statistics
- Fumble recoveries: 1
- Sacks: 1
- Stats at Pro Football Reference

Kenneth Henry Kirk (February 26, 1938 – November 16, 2009) was an American professional football player who was a linebacker for the Chicago Bears (1960–1961), Pittsburgh Steelers (1962), and Los Angeles Rams (1963) of the National Football League (NFL). He played college football for the Ole Miss Rebels.

== Early life ==
A native of Tupelo, Mississippi, Kirk attended Tupelo High School and then played college football at the University of Mississippi from 1957 to 1959. He was a co-captain of the 1959 Ole Miss Rebels football team that compiled a 10–1 record, gave up only 21 points during the entire season, and was recognized as national champion. He graduated in 1960 with a degree in finance.

== Professional career ==
Kirk was selected by the Chicago Bears in the ninth round with the 104th overall pick in the 1960 NFL draft. He played for the Bears during the 1960 and 1961 seasons, the Pittsburgh Steelers in 1962, and the Los Angeles Rams in 1963. He appeared in a total of 44 NFL games.

== Personal life and death ==
After his football career ended, Kirk worked as a real estate developer, property manager, and construction executive. He died in 2009 at the North Mississippi Medical Center in Tupelo, Mississippi.
