= Hugh McInnis =

American football player (1938–2019)

No. 86, 84
- Position: Tight end

Personal information
- Born: September 18, 1938; Mobile, Alabama, U.S.
- Died: July 18, 2019 (aged 80); Winder, Georgia, U.S.
- Listed height: 6 ft 3 in (1.91 m)
- Listed weight: 228 lb (103 kg)

Career information
- College: Southern Miss
- NFL draft: 1960: 3rd round, 26th overall pick
- AFL draft: 1960

Career history
- St. Louis Cardinals (1960–1962); Dallas Cowboys (1963)*; Detroit Lions (1964); BC Lions (1967)
- * Offseason or practice squad member only

Awards and highlights
- First-team Little All-American (1959)

Career NFL statistics
- Receptions: 22
- Receiving yards: 392
- Stats at Pro Football Reference

Hugh McInnis (September 18, 1938 – July 18, 2019) was an American professional football player who was a tight end for five seasons with the St. Louis Cardinals, and Detroit Lions of the National Football League (NFL). He played college football for the Southern Miss Golden Eagles before being selected by the Cardinals in the third round of the 1960 NFL draft.

McInnis died on July 18, 2019, at the age of 80.
