= Sam Horner =

American football player (born 1938)

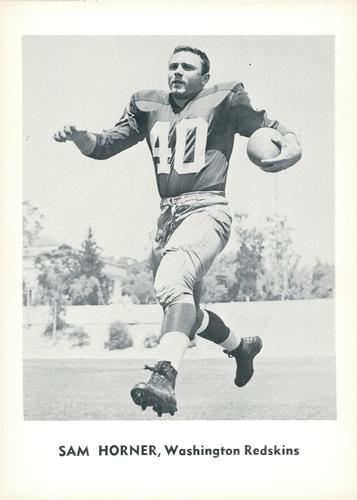

No. 40, 26
- Positions: Halfback, defensive back, punter

Personal information
- Born: March 4, 1938 (age 88); Fort Sill, Oklahoma, U.S.
- Listed height: 6 ft 0 in (1.83 m)
- Listed weight: 198 lb (90 kg)

Career information
- High school: The Hill School (Pottstown, Pennsylvania)
- College: VMI
- NFL draft: 1960: 2nd round, 21st overall pick
- AFL draft: 1960: Second Selectionsth round

Career history
- Washington Redskins (1960–1961); New York Giants (1962)

Awards and highlights
- Third-team All-American (1959)

Career NFL statistics
- Rushing yards: 355
- Rushing average: 3
- Receptions: 17
- Receiving yards: 219
- Total touchdowns: 1
- Stats at Pro Football Reference

Samuel Watson Horner, III (born March 4, 1938) is an American former professional football player who was a halfback, defensive back, and punter in the National Football League (NFL) for the Washington Redskins and the New York Giants. He played college football for the VMI Keydets and was selected in the second round of the 1960 NFL draft. He is a 1956 graduate of The Hill School

== Other work ==
After Horner retired from the NFL, he attended the University of Georgia Veterinary School and earned a DVM degree. He practiced Equine Medicine and Surgery for 40 years in the Atlanta, Ga. area until his retirement in 2008. Sam was inducted into the VMI Sports Hall of Fame in 1973, and in 2000 he was the Georgia Equine Veterinarian of the Year.
