= Andy Stynchula =

American football player (1939–1985)

No. 71, 72, 83, 87
- Position: Defensive tackle / Defensive end

Personal information
- Born: January 7, 1939; Greenwald, Pennsylvania, U.S.
- Died: August 1, 1985 (aged 46); Berry Islands, Bahamas
- Listed height: 6 ft 3 in (1.91 m)
- Listed weight: 250 lb (113 kg)

Career information
- High school: Latrobe (PA)
- College: Penn State
- NFL draft: 1960: 3rd round, 28th overall pick
- AFL draft: 1960

Career history
- Washington Redskins (1960–1963); New York Giants (1964–1965); Baltimore Colts (1966–1967); Dallas Cowboys (1968)

Awards and highlights
- Pro Bowl (1960); NFL All-rookie team (1960); Red Worrell Award (1958); First-team All-Eastern (1959)

Career NFL statistics
- Games played: 104
- Fumble recoveries: 11
- Stats at Pro Football Reference

Andrew Ralph Stynchula (January 7, 1939 – August 1, 1985) was an American professional football defensive lineman in the National Football League (NFL) for the Washington Redskins, New York Giants, Baltimore Colts, and Dallas Cowboys. He played college football at Penn State University.

== Early life ==
Stynchula attended Latrobe High School, before moving on to Penn State University. He played as a defensive and offensive tackle.

In 1958, he was the first recipient of the Red Worrell Award, given in Penn State to the player that shows exemplary conduct, loyalty, interest, attitude and improvement during spring practice.

== Professional career ==
=== Washington Redskins ===
Stynchula was selected in the third round (28th overall) of the 1960 NFL draft. He was also selected by the New York Titans in the 1960 AFL draft. As a rookie, he was named the starter at right defensive end and received Pro Bowl honors.

On April 10, 1964, he was traded along with running back Dick James to the New York Giants in exchange for All-Pro linebacker Sam Huff and a fifth round draft choice (#62-Frank Lambert).

=== New York Giants ===
In 1964, he was moved to left defensive tackle. The next year, he was switched to right defensive end and played out his contract option, so he could become a free agent in 1966. On February 16, 1966, to avoid losing him without receiving any compensation, he was traded to the Baltimore Colts in exchange for safety Wendell Harris.

=== Baltimore Colts ===
In 1966, he was placed on the injured reserve list after the eighth game of the season. He was released on September 10, 1968.

=== Dallas Cowboys ===
On October 31, 1968, he was signed by the Dallas Cowboys to the taxi squad. On November 9, he was promoted to the active roster and played in 5 games as a reserve. On July 13, 1969, he announced his retirement.

== Personal life ==
On Thursday, August 1, 1985, he died in a car accident on the northernmost island of the Berry Islands, while on vacation in the Bahamas.
