= Jim Crotty =

American football player (1938–2021)

No. 22, 46, 25, 33
- Position: Defensive back

Personal information
- Born: March 31, 1938; Storm Lake, Iowa, U.S.
- Died: 20 November 2021 (aged 83); Burien, Washington, U.S.
- Listed height: 6 ft 1 in (1.85 m)
- Listed weight: 190 lb (86 kg)

Career information
- High school: Falls (International Falls, Minnesota)
- College: Notre Dame
- NFL draft: 1960: 12th round, 136th overall pick
- AFL draft: 1960: 2nd round

Career history
- Washington Redskins (1960–1961); Buffalo Bills (1961–1962); Calgary Stampeders (1963)

Career NFL/AFL statistics
- Interceptions: 3
- Fumble recoveries: 1
- Stats at Pro Football Reference

James Richard Crotty (March 31, 1938 – November 20, 2021) was an American professional football defensive back in the National Football League (NFL) for the Washington Redskins and in the American Football League (AFL) for the Buffalo Bills. He played college football at the University of Notre Dame and was selected in the 12th round of the 1960 NFL draft.

In 1969, Crotty married Karen Kerola. They had four children, all of whom are living.

Crotty died on November 20, 2021, in Burien, Washington. He was 83 years old.
