= Fred Hageman =

American football player (1937–2012)

No. 50
- Positions: Center, linebacker

Personal information
- Born: June 30, 1937; Bunkie, Louisiana, U.S.
- Died: November 4, 2012 (aged 75); Lawrence, Kansas, U.S.
- Listed height: 6 ft 5 in (1.96 m)
- Listed weight: 242 lb (110 kg)

Career information
- High school: Batesville (Batesville, Arkansas)
- College: Arkansas (1955); Kansas (1958-1960)
- NFL draft: 1960: 8th round, 96th overall pick
- AFL draft: 1960

Career history
- Washington Redskins (1961–1964); Chicago Bears (1965)

Awards and highlights
- 2× First-team All-Big Eight (1959, 1960)

Career NFL statistics
- Games played: 55
- Games started: 44
- Fumble recoveries: 2
- Stats at Pro Football Reference

Fred John Hageman (June 30, 1937 – November 4, 2012) was an American football linebacker in the National Football League (NFL) for the Washington Redskins. He played college football at the University of Arkansas and University of Kansas, and was drafted in the 2nd round in 1959 by the Oakland Raiders but did not report and returned to Kansas to finish his undergraduate degree and play out his senior season where he was a 2 time All Big 8 selection as a center and middle linebacker. He was a Tri-Captain and played in 4 post season games including the College All-Star game with numerous All Americans. Was drafted in the 7th round of the 1960 NFL draft by the New York Giants and was immediately traded to Washington for cash and a high draft pick. He was the "Tribe's" defensive leader and starting middle linebacker upon reporting to camp. He was a runner-up for Rookie of the Year as a middle linebacker and played more minutes than any other player in the NFL in 1961. After his first stellar season, he was moved to starting Center where he played at an elite level. He was traded to the Chicago Bears in 1965, where he was injured in a pre-season game. Although urged to return by many, Fred returned to Kansas and earned his master's degree in education.

He went on to a successful business career. The "gentle giant" at 6 foot 5 and 255 pounds of solid muscle with world class speed, Hageman was named as Kansas University's "Center of the Century" and was named to its first team "All-Time KU Football Team". Known as "Pappy" to many, he led Kansas to a #2 Ranking and a Big 8 Championship in 1960. Some believe the teams he led in 1959 and 1960, along with John Hadl, were the best in KU's history. Hageman was enshrined in the Batesville, Arkansas Area Sports Hall of Fame in 1989. He was the first All-State Athlete at Batesville High School.
