= Max Messner =

American football player (1938–1996)

No. 64, 54
- Position: Linebacker

Personal information
- Born: October 13, 1938 (age 88); Ashland, Ohio, U.S.
- Died: March 13, 1996 (aged 57)
- Listed height: 6 ft 3 in (1.91 m)
- Listed weight: 225 lb (102 kg)

Career information
- High school: Ashland
- College: Cincinnati
- NFL draft: 1960: 9th round, 99th overall pick
- AFL draft: 1960

Career history
- Detroit Lions (1960–1963); New York Giants (1964); Pittsburgh Steelers (1964–1965)

Career NFL statistics
- Interceptions: 2
- Fumble recoveries: 3
- Sacks: 6
- Stats at Pro Football Reference

Max Messner was an American professional football player who was a linebacker for six seasons for the Pittsburgh Steelers, Detroit Lions, and New York Giants
