= Bill Burrell =

American football player (1936–1998)

Profile
- Positions: Linebacker, offensive guard

Personal information
- Born: May 27, 1936; Chebanse, Illinois, U.S.
- Died: March 28, 1998 (aged 61); Aurora, Illinois, U.S.
- Listed height: 6 ft 0 in (1.83 m)
- Listed weight: 220 lb (100 kg)

Career information
- College: University of Illinois
- NFL draft: 1959: 5th round

Career history
- 1960–1965: Saskatchewan Roughriders

Awards and highlights
- 2× CFL West All-Star (1960, 1962)

William Ford Burrell (May 27, 1936 – March 22, 1998) was an American football player at the University of Illinois.

== Early life ==
Burrell was the third son born in Illinois. He attended Central High School in Clifton, Illinois, excelling in football and basketball.

== Career ==
A linebacker and guard, in 1959 Burrell won the Chicago Tribune Silver Football as the MVP of the Big Ten Conference. Burrell also finished fourth as a Heisman Trophy candidate that year, the first Illini to finish in the top four for the Heisman. He was a consensus All-American. He was the first black captain of the Illini football team. Jesse Jackson, a freshman on the 1959 team and future reverend, marveled at Burrell's ability to make tackles when double-teamed, calling it "marvelous". His 26 tackles against Purdue was a school record for 18 years. Burrell served in the Army ROTC program during his time at Illinois. Representative of the times, rather than doing desk work that other athletes did, Burrell and other black student-athletes were assigned to pick up trash at Memorial Stadium. Burrell is among the fabled members of the "cradle of linebackers" that played at Illinois alongside Ray Nitschke and Dick Butkus. Despite his accomplishments, Burrell has not been inducted into the College Football Hall of Fame nor was he nominated for decades.

Burrell was drafted by the Buffalo Bills in the 1960 American Football League draft, and by the St. Louis Cardinals in the fifth round of the 1960 NFL draft.

Rejecting the AFL and NFL due to money, he played for the Saskatchewan Roughriders of the Canadian Football League and was that team's nominee for the Schenley Award as Outstanding Lineman in 1960. He was named a CFL Western All-Star in 1960 and 1962. He became a business owner in Kankakee, Illinois after retirement, building and buying apartments and businesses. He also worked with the NAACP.

== Personal life ==
Bill Burrell died on March 22, 1998 in Aurora, Illinois at the age of 61.

== Legacy ==
The football field at Central High was named Bill Burrell Field on September 15, 2017. Burrell is included in The Pigskin Club of Washington, D.C. National Intercollegiate All-American Football Players Honor Roll. Burrell was inducted into the Illinois Athletics Hall of Fame in 2022.
