= Don Ellersick =

American football player (1938–1996)

No. 44
- Position: Defensive back

Personal information
- Born: May 7, 1938; Ione, Washington, U.S.
- Died: June 13, 1996 (aged 58); Spokane, Washington, U.S.
- Listed height: 6 ft 1 in (1.85 m)
- Listed weight: 193 lb (88 kg)

Career information
- High school: Newport (WA)
- College: Washington State
- NFL draft: 1960: 6th round, 66th overall pick
- AFL draft: 1960

Career history
- Los Angeles Rams (1960); Green Bay Packers (1961)*
- * Offseason or practice squad member only

Career NFL statistics
- Interceptions: 2
- Stats at Pro Football Reference

Don Ellersick (May 7, 1938 – June 13, 1996) was an American football defensive back. He played for the Los Angeles Rams in 1960.
