= Lonnie Dennis =

American gridiron football player (born 1937)

No. 61
- Position: Offensive tackle

Personal information
- Born: December 10, 1937; Los Angeles, California, U.S.
- Died: January 6, 1997 (aged 59)
- Listed height: 6 ft 1 in (1.85 m)
- Listed weight: 220 lb (100 kg)

Career information
- College: BYU (1956–1960)
- NFL draft: 1960: 7th round, 78th overall pick
- AFL draft: 1960

Career history
- 1960–1968: BC Lions

Awards and highlights
- 2× CFL All-Star (1963, 1964); 3× CFL West All-Star (1962, 1963, 1964); BC Lions Wall of Fame

Lonnie Dennis (December 10, 1937 – January 6, 1997) was an American professional football player with the Canadian Football League (CFL)'s the British Columbia Lions. After playing college football at Brigham Young University, Dennis spent his entire 9-year CFL career as an offensive lineman for the Lions. He was named CFL All-Star in 1963 and 1964, and was a part of the Lions Grey Cup victory in 1964. Dennis died on January 6, 1997 at the age of 59.
