= Bill Mathis =

American football player (1938–2020)

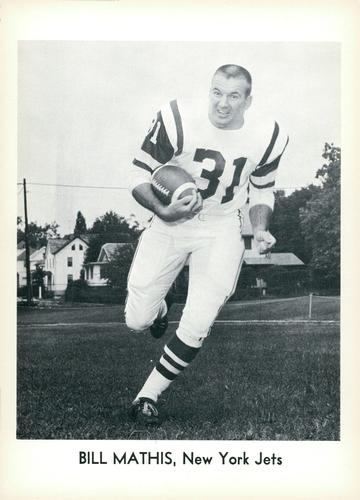

No. 31
- Position: Running back

Personal information
- Born: December 10, 1938; Rocky Mount, North Carolina, U.S.
- Died: October 20, 2020 (aged 81); Marietta, Georgia, U.S.
- Listed height: 6 ft 1 in (1.85 m)
- Listed weight: 220 lb (100 kg)

Career information
- High school: Manchester (GA)
- College: Clemson
- NFL draft: 1960: 8th round, 88th overall pick
- AFL draft: 1960: 1st round

Career history
- New York Titans/Jets (1960–1969)

Awards and highlights
- Super Bowl champion (III); TSN All-AFL (1961); 2× AFL All-Star (1961, 1963); First-team All-ACC (1959)

Career AFL statistics
- Rushing yards: 3,589
- Rushing average: 3.4
- Receptions: 149
- Receiving yards: 1,775
- Total touchdowns: 46
- Stats at Pro Football Reference

Bill Mathis (December 10, 1938 – October 20, 2020) was an American professional football player who was a running back for the New York Titans/Jets in the American Football League (AFL). He played college football for the Clemson Tigers. He also competed on the Clemson Tigers track and field team. He started his professional career with the Titans, and played his entire career with the AFL's New York franchise. One of four Titans who remained with the New York Jets to play in and win a Super Bowl, Mathis led the AFL in carries in 1961 and was selected by his peers to the Sporting News 1961 AFL All-League team. He was an AFL Eastern Division All-Star in 1961 and 1963. Mathis had a collarbone broken in the third game of 1961, against the Boston Patriots. He played in the next game, and in fact in all the remaining games of the season.

That persistence allowed him to gain a roster spot year after year, including being a member of the 1968 world champion Jets team that beat the NFL champion Baltimore Colts in Super Bowl III. Mathis played one additional season in 1969 before retiring. He is one of 20 players who were in the AFL for its entire 10-year existence, and one of 7 players who played their entire AFL careers for one franchise. He was inducted into the Clemson University Hall of Fame, South Carolina Hall of Fame, and the Georgia Hall of Fame.

While a member of the Jets, Mathis appeared as an imposter for a Coast Guard captain on the October 11, 1965 episode of the CBS Television game show To Tell the Truth, receiving one of the four votes.

After retiring from football, Mathis began a career on Wall Street, starting at the firm Cogan, Berlind, Weill & Levitt.

== AFL career statistics ==
Legend
	Won the Super Bowl
	Led the league
**Bold**	Career high

=== Regular season ===
Year	Team	Games		Rushing					Receiving				
Year	Team	GP	GS	Att	Yds	Avg	Lng	TD	Rec	Yds	Avg	Lng	TD
1960	NYT	14	9	92	307	3.3	17	2	18	103	5.7	24	0
1961	NYT	14	14	**202**	**846**	**4.2**	30	**7**	12	42	3.5	14	1
1962	NYT	11	6	71	245	3.5	41	3	6	32	5.3	14	0
1963	NYJ	14	12	107	268	2.5	16	1	18	177	9.8	33	1
1964	NYJ	14	13	105	305	2.9	31	4	4	39	9.8	15	0
1965	NYJ	14	14	147	604	4.1	**79**	5	17	242	14.2	32	1
1966	NYJ	14	7	72	208	2.9	23	2	22	379	**17.2**	**70**	1
1967	NYJ	14	9	78	243	3.1	18	4	**25**	**429**	**17.2**	38	**3**
1968	NYJ	14	5	74	208	2.8	16	5	9	149	16.6	31	1
1969	NYJ	14	2	96	355	3.7	27	4	18	183	10.2	35	1
Career		137	91	1,044	3,589	3.4	79	37	149	1,775	11.9	70	9

=== Playoffs ===
Year	Team	Games		Rushing					Receiving				
Year	Team	GP	GS	Att	Yds	Avg	Lng	TD	Rec	Yds	Avg	Lng	TD
1968	NYJ	2	0	**6**	10	1.7	5	0	**3**	**20**	**6.7**	**13**	0
1969	NYJ	1	0	**6**	**11**	**1.8**	**6**	0	1	4	4.0	4	0
Career		3	0	12	21	1.8	6	0	4	24	6.0	13	0

== See also ==
- Other American Football League players
