= Bob Simms =

American football player (born 1938)

No. 83, 34
- Positions: Linebacker, end

Personal information
- Born: September 3, 1938 (age 88); Clendenin, West Virginia, U.S.
- Listed height: 6 ft 1 in (1.85 m)
- Listed weight: 230 lb (104 kg)

Career information
- High school: Charleston (Charleston, West Virginia)
- College: Rutgers
- NFL draft: 1960: 10th round, 120th overall pick
- AFL draft: 1960

Career history
- New York Giants (1960–1962); Pittsburgh Steelers (1962)

Awards and highlights
- Second-team All-Eastern (1959)

Career NFL statistics
- Fumble recoveries: 2
- Stats at Pro Football Reference

Robert Alderson Simms (born September 3, 1938) is an American former professional football player who was a linebacker for three seasons with the New York Giants and Pittsburgh Steelers of the National Football League (NFL). He played college football for the Rutgers Scarlet Knights.
