= Rod Breedlove =

American football player (1938–2021)

No. 63
- Position: Linebacker

Personal information
- Born: March 10, 1938; Cumberland, Maryland, U.S.
- Died: May 25, 2021 (aged 83); Rising Sun, Maryland, U.S.
- Listed height: 6 ft 2 in (1.88 m)
- Listed weight: 230 lb (104 kg)

Career information
- High school: Allegany (Cumberland)
- College: Maryland
- NFL draft: 1960: 3rd round, 35th overall pick
- AFL draft: 1960

Career history
- Washington Redskins (1960–1964); Pittsburgh Steelers (1965–1967)

Awards and highlights
- Pro Bowl (1962); 2× First-team All-ACC (1957, 1958); Second-team All-ACC (1959)

Career NFL statistics
- Interceptions: 11
- Fumble recoveries: 9
- Sacks: 15
- Stats at Pro Football Reference

Rodney Winston Breedlove (March 10, 1938 – May 25, 2021) was an American professional football player who was a linebacker for eight seasons in the National Football League (NFL) with the Washington Redskins and the Pittsburgh Steelers from 1960 to 1967. Breedlove was a one-time Pro Bowler in 1962.

Breedlove received an All-American honorable mention in 1957–59, AP All-ACC selection in 1957 and 1958, and All-ACC First-team selection in 1957 as a Maryland Terrapins guard.
