= Charley Britt =

American football player (born 1938)

No. 17
- Position: Defensive back

Personal information
- Born: March 20, 1938 (age 88); Augusta, Georgia, U.S.
- Listed height: 6 ft 2 in (1.88 m)
- Listed weight: 180 lb (82 kg)

Career information
- High school: North Augusta (SC)
- College: Georgia
- NFL draft: 1960: 3rd round, 25th overall pick
- AFL draft: 1960

Career history
- Los Angeles Rams (1960–1963); Minnesota Vikings (1964); San Francisco 49ers (1964)

Career NFL statistics
- Interceptions: 14
- Interception yards: 241
- Touchdowns: 1
- Stats at Pro Football Reference

Charles William Britt (born March 20, 1938) is an American former professional football player who was a defensive back in the National Football League (NFL). He played college football as a quarterback for the Georgia Bulldogs. Britt was selected by the Los Angeles Rams in the third round of the 1960 NFL draft and also played for the Minnesota Vikings and San Francisco 49ers.

During his playing career, Britt appeared in the TV series, The Adventures of Ozzie and Harriet from 1961 to 1965.
