= Dave Ross (American football) =

American football player (born 1938)

No. 80
- Position: End

Personal information
- Born: February 1, 1938 (age 88); San Diego County, California, U.S.
- Listed height: 6 ft 3 in (1.91 m)
- Listed weight: 210 lb (95 kg)

Career information
- High school: California (Whittier, California)
- College: Los Angeles State
- NFL draft: 1960: 12th round, 135th overall pick
- AFL draft: 1960

Career history
- Washington Redskins (1960)*; New York Titans (1960); Oakland Raiders (1961)*
- * Offseason or practice squad member only

Career AFL statistics
- Receptions: 10
- Receiving yards: 122
- Touchdowns: 1
- Stats at Pro Football Reference

David Ross (born February 1, 1938) is an American former professional football player who was an end with the New York Titans of the American Football League (AFL). He played college football for Los Angeles State College.
