= Ed Kovac =

American football player (1938–2020)

No. 35, 43
- Positions: Running back, safety

Personal information
- Born: April 22, 1938; McKeesport, Pennsylvania, U.S.
- Died: March 8, 2020 (aged 81); Cincinnati, Ohio, U.S.
- Listed height: 6 ft 0 in (1.83 m)
- Listed weight: 195 lb (88 kg)

Career information
- High school: McKeesport
- College: Cincinnati (1956–1959)
- NFL draft: 1960: 6th round, 68th overall pick
- AFL draft: 1960: 1st round

Career history
- Chicago Bears (1960); Baltimore Colts (1960–1961)*; New York Titans/Jets (1962–1963)
- * Offseason or practice squad member only

Awards and highlights
- 2× First-team All-MVC (1958–1959)

Career NFL statistics
- Games played: 16
- Games started: 4
- Rushing yards: 6
- Receptions: 3
- Receiving yards: 30
- Return yards: 90
- Interceptions: 1
- Stats at Pro Football Reference

Edward William Kovac (April 22, 1938 – March 8, 2020) was an American former professional football running back and safety who played in the National Football League (NFL) with the Chicago Bears and Baltimore Colts and the American Football League (AFL) with the New York Titans/Jets. He played college football for the Cincinnati Bearcats.

== Early life ==
Kovac was born on April 22, 1938, in McKeesport, Pennsylvania. He attended McKeesport Area High School.

== College career ==
Kovac played college football for the Cincinnati Bearcats from 1956 to 1959. He was a three-year letterman from 1957 to 1959. In 30 games, Kovac totaled 958 rushing yards on 267 attempts, 13 rushing touchdowns, 38 receptions for 460 yards and five receiving touchdowns. He also attempted five passes, completing four of them for 74 yards and two touchdowns. Kovac was a two time All-Missouri Valley Conference recipient in 1958 and 1959.

== Professional career ==
=== Chicago Bears ===
Kovac was selected in the sixth round, with the 68th overall selection, by the Chicago Bears in the 1960 NFL draft. On April 30, 1960, he officially signed with the team. Kovac was released by the team prior to the start of the season.

=== Baltimore Colts ===
On September 21, 1960, Kovac was picked up off waivers by the Baltimore Colts. He played in 12 games, recording one rushing yard, two receptions for 27 yards and eight return yards. On May 20, 1961, Kovac re-signed with the Colts. On August 29, he was released by the team as part of roster cut-downs.

=== New York Titans/Jets ===
In 1962, after Kovac returned from military service, he signed with the New York Titans of the American Football League (AFL) who had drafted him in 1960. On September 4, 1962, he was released but was re-signed on October 4. He played on both sides of the ball as a running back and safety, and rushed for five yards, caught one pass for three yards, 72 return yards and one interception. On August 13, 1963 he was released by the team.
