= Jack Atchason =

American football player (1936–2020)

No. 84, 85
- Position: End

Personal information
- Born: November 16, 1936; Springfield, Illinois, U.S.
- Died: February 5, 2020 (aged 83); Camp Hill, Pennsylvania, U.S.
- Listed height: 6 ft 4 in (1.93 m)
- Listed weight: 215 lb (98 kg)

Career information
- College: Western Illinois
- AFL draft: 1960

Career history
- Boston Patriots (1960); Houston Oilers (1960)

Awards and highlights
- AFL champion (1960)

Career statistics
- Games played-started: 3
- Receptions: 5
- Receiving yards: 48
- Touchdowns: 1
- Stats at Pro Football Reference

John Dean "Jack" Atchason (November 16, 1936 - February 5, 2020) was an American football end. He played college football at Western Illinois University, and played professionally in the American Football League (AFL) in 1960, for the Boston Patriots and the Houston Oilers.

Atchason died on February 5, 2020.

== See also ==
- List of American Football League players
