= Ronnie Koes =

American gridiron football player (1937–2014)

No. 57, 56
- Positions: Centre, linebacker

Personal information
- Born: August 6, 1937; Duryea, Pennsylvania, U.S.
- Died: November 30, 2014 (aged 77); Bridgewater, New Jersey, U.S.
- Listed height: 6 ft 2 in (1.88 m)
- Listed weight: 230 lb (104 kg)

Career information
- College: North Carolina
- NFL draft: 1959: 3rd round, 30th overall pick

Career history
- 1959–1960: Saskatchewan Roughriders
- 1960–1961: Ottawa Rough Riders

Awards and highlights
- Grey Cup champion (1960); First-team All-ACC (1958)

Ronald "Killer" Koes (August 6, 1937 – November 30, 2014) was an American professional football player who played for the Saskatchewan Roughriders and Ottawa Rough Riders. He won the Grey Cup with them in 1960. Before he went into the CFL, he was selected by the Detroit Lions 30th overall in the third round of the 1959 NFL draft. He played college football for the University of North Carolina at Chapel Hill. Koes died in 2014 at the age of 77.
