= Taz Anderson =

American football player (1938–2016)

No. 85, 87
- Position: Tight end

Personal information
- Born: November 15, 1938; Savannah, Georgia, U.S.
- Died: September 26, 2016 (aged 77); Atlanta, Georgia, U.S.
- Listed height: 6 ft 2 in (1.88 m)
- Listed weight: 220 lb (100 kg)

Career information
- High school: Savannah (GA)
- College: Georgia Tech
- NFL draft: 1960: 7th round, 80th overall pick
- AFL draft: 1960: 2nd round

Career history
- St. Louis Cardinals (1961–1964); Atlanta Falcons (1966–1967)

Awards and highlights
- Cardinals Rookie of the Year (1961); Savannah (GA) Football athlete of century; Georgia Sports Hall of Fame; Georgia Tech Athletic Hall of Fame

Career NFL statistics
- Receptions: 87
- Receiving yards: 1,335
- Receiving touchdowns: 9
- Stats at Pro Football Reference

Tazwell Leigh Anderson Jr. (November 15, 1938 – September 26, 2016) was an American football player who played for the Georgia Tech Yellow Jackets football team and professionally for the St. Louis Cardinals and the Atlanta Falcons. While at Georgia Tech, he was a member of Chi Phi fraternity. In 2005, he was elected to the Georgia Sports Hall of Fame.

After his professional sports career, Anderson became an Atlanta-area realtor, and owned TazMedia and Taz Anderson Realty. He helped create the Centennial Tower (a large olympic flame commemorating the 1996 Summer Olympics) next to The Varsity.

Anderson was also deeply involved with the Georgia Tech Athletic Association; for ten years, he was a trustee, and "has been [a] member of or chair of every major project for the Tech Athletic Association for the past 30 years." He organized and served as developer of the 1985 renovation of Alexander Memorial Coliseum. He died on September 26, 2016, at the age of 77.
