= Buddy Allen =

American football player (1937–2020)

No. 22
- Position: Halfback

Personal information
- Born: July 11, 1937; St. Louis, Missouri
- Died: January 15, 2020 (aged 82)
- Listed height: 5 ft 11 in (1.80 m)
- Listed weight: 193 lb (88 kg)

Career information
- High school: McClymonds (Oakland, California)
- College: Utah State
- AFL draft: 1960: 1st round

Career history
- Denver Broncos (1961); Indianapolis Warriors (1961–1964); Philadelphia Bulldogs (1965–1966); Wilmington Clippers (1967); Pottstown Firebirds (1968–1970)

Career statistics
- Games played: 1
- Rushing attempts: 3
- Rushing yards: -4
- Receptions: 0
- Receiving yards: 0
- Touchdowns: 0
- Stats at Pro Football Reference

Elihu "Buddy" Allen Jr. (July 11, 1937 – January 15, 2020) was an American football halfback.

Allen was born in 1937 in St. Louis. He attended McClymonds High School in Oakland, California. He played college football at Oakland Junior College in 1955 and 1956. He next played for Utah State University from 1957 to 1959.

Allen played professional football in 1961 for the Denver Broncos of the American Football League, appearing in one game. He also played for the Indianapolis Warriors of the United Football League from 1961 to 1963 and for the Philadelphia Bulldogs of the Continental Football League in 1965 and 1966. He helped the Bulldogs win the CFL title in 1966. He concluded his career in the Atlantic Coast Football League, playing for the Wilmington Clippers (1967) and Pottstown Firebirds (1968–1970).

Allen was also a detective for the Philadelphia police department. He died on January 15, 2020, at the age of 82.

== See also ==
- List of American Football League players
