= Jim Leo =

American football player (born 1937)

No. 30, 59, 51, 77, 72, 87, 83, 84
- Positions: Defensive end, linebacker

Personal information
- Born: June 18, 1937 (age 89); Niagara Falls, New York, U.S.
- Listed height: 6 ft 1 in (1.85 m)
- Listed weight: 228 lb (103 kg)

Career information
- High school: Bishop Duffy (Niagara Falls)
- College: Cincinnati
- NFL draft: 1960: 3rd round, 36th overall pick
- AFL draft: 1960: 1st round

Career history
- New York Giants (1960); Minnesota Vikings (1961–1962); Buffalo Bills (1963)*; Toronto Argonauts (1963–1964); Toronto Rifles (1965-1967); Orlando Panthers (1967)
- * Offseason or practice squad member only

Career NFL statistics
- Fumble recoveries: 1
- Sacks: 4
- Safeties: 1
- Stats at Pro Football Reference

James Phillip Leo (born June 18, 1937) is an American former professional football player who was a defensive end with the New York Giants and Minnesota Vikings of the National Football League (NFL). He played college football for the Cincinnati Bearcats. He was born in Niagara Falls, New York, where he went to Bishop Duffy High School.
