= Stan Fanning =

American football player (1937–1995)

No. 65, 79, 86
- Positions: Offensive tackle, defensive tackle, defensive end

Personal information
- Born: November 22, 1937; Peoria, Illinois, U.S.
- Died: November 21, 1995 (aged 57)
- Listed height: 6 ft 7 in (2.01 m)
- Listed weight: 270 lb (122 kg)

Career information
- High school: Pullman (WA)
- College: Idaho
- NFL draft: 1960: 11th round, 128th overall pick
- AFL draft: 1960

Career history
- Chicago Bears (1960–1962); Los Angeles Rams (1963); Denver Broncos (1964); Houston Oilers (1964)

Career NFL/AFL statistics
- Games played: 52
- Games started: 5
- Fumble recoveries: 3
- Stats at Pro Football Reference

Stanley Lynn Fanning (November 22, 1937 – November 21, 1995) was an American professional football tackle, defensive end, and defensive tackle. He played for the Chicago Bears from 1960 to 1962, the Los Angeles Rams in 1963 and the Denver Broncos and Houston Oilers in 1964.

Fanning went to high school in Pullman, Washington, and played college football at nearby Idaho. He was selected by the Bears in the eleventh round of the 1960 NFL draft, 128th overall.
