= Mike McGee (American football) =

American football player and coach (1938–2019)

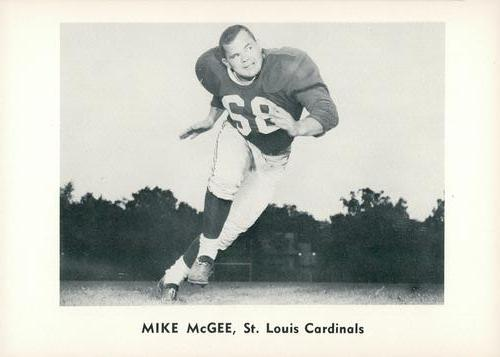
- McGee in 1961

No. 68
- Position: Guard

Personal information
- Born: December 1, 1938; Washington, D.C., U.S.
- Died: August 16, 2019 (aged 80); Montrose, Colorado, U.S.
- Listed height: 6 ft 1 in (1.85 m)
- Listed weight: 230 lb (104 kg)

Career information
- High school: Elizabeth City (Elizabeth City, North Carolina)
- College: Duke
- NFL draft: 1960: 2nd round, 14th overall pick
- AFL draft: 1960: 1st round

Career history

Playing
- St. Louis Cardinals (1960–1962)

Coaching
- Duke (1963–1965) Assistant coach; Wisconsin (1966) Assistant coach; Minnesota (1967–1969) Assistant coach; East Carolina (1970) Head coach; Duke (1971–1978) Head coach

Operations
- Cincinnati (1980–1984) Athletic director; USC (1984–1993) Athletic director; South Carolina (1993–2005) Athletic director

Awards and highlights
- Outland Trophy (1959); First-team All-American (1959); ACC Player of the Year (1959); ACC Athlete of the Year (1960); 2× First-team All-ACC (1958, 1959)

Career NFL statistics
- Games played: 37
- Games started: 36
- Fumble recoveries: 2
- Stats at Pro Football Reference

Head coaching record
- Regular season: 40–55–4 (.424)
- College Football Hall of Fame

Michael Burnette McGee (December 1, 1938 – August 16, 2019) was an American professional football player who was an offensive guard in the National Football League (NFL) who later became a successful college football coach and college athletics administrator. He was an All-American at Duke University and in 1959 won the Outland Trophy, given to the nation's best interior lineman. After playing for the St. Louis Cardinals from 1960 to 1962, he returned as an assistant coach to Duke, and then at the University of Minnesota and the University of Wisconsin–Madison, before becoming head coach at East Carolina University (1970) and Duke (1971–1978). At East Carolina, he compiled a 3–8 record, and at Duke he compiled a 37–47–4 record. His overall record as a head coach was 40–55–4. His best seasons came in 1971 and 1974, when he went 6–5. He later became athletic director at the University of Cincinnati (1980–1984), the University of Southern California (1984–1993), and the University of South Carolina (1993–2005). McGee was inducted into the College Football Hall of Fame as a player in 1990. He died in 2019 at the age of 80.

== University of South Carolina ==
McGee's years at the University of South Carolina were arguably his most successful. The university did not previously have a significant history of success. Before McGee's arrival, the Gamecocks had won no national championships.

McGee's goal was to build a foundation to foster athletic success for years to come. Upon his retirement, his accomplishments at the University of South Carolina included:

- After winning only one football bowl game previously, the Gamecocks won three straight bowl games, including back-to-back Outback Bowl Championships against Ohio State. Those two victories catapulted the school to consecutive Top 20 national finishes, a first in the history of the program. Included in that stretch (2000–01) were the most wins (17) in consecutive years in the history of the football program.
- McGee's ability to attract and hire high-caliber coaches. Among his hires at South Carolina were Curtis Frye (track and field), Lou Holtz (football), Ray Tanner (baseball), Dave Odom (men's basketball) and Steve Spurrier (football). Over McGee's final eight seasons, 13 Gamecock head coaches had earned either National Coach of the Year or Southeastern Conference Coach of the Year accolades.
- Overseeing a dramatic increase in the athletics department's overall revenue, rising from approximately $18 million when he first came to South Carolina, to $52.8 million in fiscal year 2004.
- The women's track team won the school's first national team championship, claiming the 2002 NCAA Outdoor title.
- The baseball team made three straight appearances in the College World Series and was the winningest program in the country over McGee's final five seasons.
- In 2000, for the first time in the history of the Southeastern Conference, South Carolina had three athletes named National Athlete of the Year in their respective sports: Kip Bouknight (baseball); Terrence Trammell (men's indoor and outdoor track); and Miki Barber (women's outdoor track).
- Winning eight SEC team championships, including baseball (3), women's outdoor track (2), men's basketball (1), softball (1), and women's golf (1).
- More than $110 million in facility improvements, including the 18,000-seat Colonial Center and a major expansion of Williams-Brice Stadium.

== Head coaching record ==
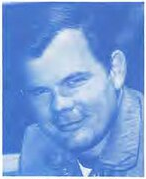
McGee in 1976

Year	Team	Overall	Conference	Standing	Bowl/playoffs
East Carolina Pirates (Southern Conference) (1970)
1970	East Carolina	3–8	2–2	4th	
East Carolina:		3–8	2–2		
Duke Blue Devils (Atlantic Coast Conference) (1971–1978)
1971	Duke	6–5	2–3	T–3rd	
1972	Duke	5–6	3–3	4th	
1973	Duke	2–8–1	1–4–1	5th	
1974	Duke	6–5	2–4	5th	
1975	Duke	4–5–2	3–0–2	2nd	
1976	Duke	5–5–1	2–3–1	4th	
1977	Duke	5–6	2–4	5th	
1978	Duke	4–7	2–4	5th	
Duke:		37–47–4	17–25–4		
Total:		40–55–4			
