= Marvin Terrell =

American football player (1938–2018)

No. 63, 51
- Position: Guard

Personal information
- Born: June 10, 1938; West Memphis, Arkansas, U.S.
- Died: December 1, 2018 (aged 80); Jackson, Mississippi, U.S.
- Listed height: 6 ft 1 in (1.85 m)
- Listed weight: 235 lb (107 kg)

Career information
- College: Ole Miss
- NFL draft: 1960: 2nd round, 24th overall pick
- AFL draft: 1960

Career history
- Dallas Texans/Kansas City Chiefs (1960-1963); Toronto Argonauts (1964)

Awards and highlights
- AFL champion (1962); AFL All-Star (1962); First-team All-American (1959); First-team All-SEC (1959)

Career AFL statistics
- Games played: 38
- Games started: 24
- Stats at Pro Football Reference

Marvin Terrell Jr. (June 10, 1938 – December 1, 2018) was an American professional football player who was a guard for four seasons in the American Football League (AFL) from 1960 to 1963 for the Dallas Texans/Kansas City Chiefs. He played college football for the Ole Miss Rebels.

== Biography ==
He was an AFL All-Star in 1962, when the Texans won the longest game up to that time, the double-overtime victory over the Houston Oilers in the AFL Championship Game. He was inducted into the Mississippi Hall of Fame in 2001.

== See also ==
- Other American Football League players
