= 1959 All-Atlantic Coast Conference football team =

American college football all-star team

The 1959 All-Atlantic Coast Conference football team consists of American football players chosen by various selectors for their All-Atlantic Coast Conference ("ACC") teams for the 1959 college football season. Selectors in 1959 included the Associated Press (AP) and the United Press International (UPI). Players selected to the first team by both the AP and UPI are displayed below in bold.

== All-Atlantic Coast selections ==
=== Ends ===
- **Pete Manning**, Wake Forest (AP-1; UPI-1)
- **Gary Barnes**, Clemson (AP-1; UPI-1)
- Jack Pitt, South Carolina (AP-2)
- Gary Collins, Maryland (AP-2)
- Al Goldstein, North Carolina (UPI-2)
- John Schroeder, North Carolina (UPI-2)

=== Tackles ===
- **Lou Cordileone**, Clemson (AP-1; UPI-1)
- **Ed Pitts**, South Carolina (AP-1; UPI-1)
- Harold Olson, Clemson (AP-2; UPI-2)
- Jim Gardner, Duke (AP-2; UPI-2)

=== Guards ===
- **Mike McGee**, Duke (AP-1; UPI-1) (College Football Hall of Fame)
- Tom Gunerman, Maryland (AP-1)
- Nick Patella, Wake Forest (UPI-1)
- Jake Bodkin, South Carolina (AP-2; UPI-2)
- Rod Breedlove, Maryland (AP-2; UPI-2)

=== Centers ===
- Ross "Rip" Hawkins, North Carolina (AP-1)
- Paul Snyder, Clemson (AP-2; UPI-1)
- Paul Balonick, NC State (UPI-2)

=== Backs ===
- **Norm Snead**, Wake Forest (AP-1 [QB]; UPI-1)
- **Bill Mathis**, Clemson (AP-1 [HB]; UPI-1)
- **Joel Arrington**, Duke (AP-1 [HB]; UPI-1)
- Jim Joyce, Maryland (AP-1 [FB])
- Phil Lavoie, South Carolina (AP-2; UPI-1)
- Harvey White, Clemson (AP-2; UPI-2)
- Ron Podwika, NC State (AP-2; UPI-2)
- Wade Smith, North Carolina (AP-2)
- Doug Cline, Clemson (UPI-2)
- Jack Cummings, North Carolina (UPI-2)

== Key ==
AP = Associated Press

UPI = United Press International

== See also ==
- 1959 College Football All-America Team
