= Joe Kulbacki =

American football player, author, vintner, and entrepreneur

No. 43
- Position: Halfback

Personal information
- Born: March 1, 1938; Ridgway, Pennsylvania, U.S.
- Died: November 26, 2012 (aged 74); Buffalo, New York, U.S.
- Listed height: 6 ft 0 in (1.83 m)
- Listed weight: 185 lb (84 kg)

Career information
- High school: Youngsville (Youngsville, Pennsylvania)
- College: Purdue
- NFL draft: 1960: 16th round, 184th overall pick
- AFL draft: 1960: 2nd round

Career history
- Buffalo Bills (1960)

Career AFL statistics
- Rushing yards: 108
- Rushing average: 2.6
- Receptions: 2
- Receiving yards: 9
- Total touchdowns: 1
- Stats at Pro Football Reference

Joseph Vincent Kulbacki (March 1, 1938 – November 26, 2012) was an American author, vintner, entrepreneur, and football halfback, in college for Purdue and in professional football in the American Football League (AFL) for the Buffalo Bills.

== Biography ==
Born in Ridgway, Pennsylvania, on March 1, 1938, Kulbacki played college football at Purdue University. Drafted in the sixteenth round of the 1960 NFL draft by the Washington Redskins, he chose, instead, to play for the AFL's Bills during their first season, 1960.

Kulbacki was also author of America...A Nation That's Lost Its Way, a conservative critique of modern American politics and society in the context of its Judeo-Christian values, and paralleling the rise and fall of past civilizations, particularly Ancient Rome.

Kulbacki died in 2012.

== See also ==
- Other American Football League players
