= Jim Welch =

American football player (1938–2017)

No. 46
- Position: Defensive back

Personal information
- Born: March 17, 1938; Anson, Texas, U.S.
- Died: October 25, 2017 (aged 79); Southlake, Texas, U.S.
- Listed height: 6 ft 0 in (1.83 m)
- Listed weight: 196 lb (89 kg)

Career information
- High school: Abilene (Abilene, Texas)
- College: SMU
- NFL draft: 1960: 3rd round, 34th overall pick
- AFL draft: 1960: 2nd round

Career history
- Baltimore Colts (1960–1967); Detroit Lions (1968)

Awards and highlights
- Big Country Hall of Fame (2008)

Career NFL statistics
- Interceptions: 5
- Fumble recoveries: 6
- Sacks: 2
- Stats at Pro Football Reference

James Welch (March 17, 1938 — October 25, 2017) was an American professional football player for nine seasons in the National Football League (NFL).

Welch is one of at least 345 NFL players to be diagnosed after death with chronic traumatic encephalopathy (CTE), which is caused by repeated hits to the head.
