= Ed Meyer (American football) =

American football player (1936–2014)

No. 62
- Positions: Offensive tackle, guard

Personal information
- Born: October 17, 1936; Shidler, Oklahoma
- Died: March 15, 2014 (aged 77); Fort Worth, Texas

Career information
- College: West Texas State
- AFL draft: 1960: 1st round

Career history
- Pittsburgh Steelers (1960)*; Buffalo Bills (1960)
- * Offseason or practice squad member only

Career statistics
- Games played: 9
- Stats at Pro Football Reference

Clarence Edwin Meyer (October 17, 1936 – March 15, 2014) was an American football player. An offensive tackle and guard, he played professionally in the American Football League for the Buffalo Bills.

== College football ==
Meyer played college football at West Texas State, and played in the Tangerine Bowl and the Copper Bowl All-Star Game while there. He was inducted into the West Texas A&M Hall of Champions in 2010.

== Professional ==
He was drafted by the New York Titans, and signed with the Pittsburgh Steelers of the National Football League before going to the Buffalo Bills. He joined the Buffalo Bills as a tackle in 1960.
