= Curt Merz =

American football player (1938–2022)

No. 74, 77, 64
- Positions: Guard, defensive end

Personal information
- Born: April 17, 1938; Newark, New Jersey, U.S.
- Died: April 22, 2022 (aged 84); Springfield, Missouri, U.S.
- Listed height: 6 ft 4 in (1.93 m)
- Listed weight: 267 lb (121 kg)

Career information
- High school: Jonathan Dayton (Springfield, New Jersey)
- College: Iowa
- NFL draft: 1960: 3rd round, 31st overall pick
- AFL draft: 1960

Career history
- Winnipeg Blue Bombers (1960); Ottawa Rough Riders (1960); Dallas Texans / Kansas City Chiefs (1962-1968)

Awards and highlights
- 2× AFL champion (1962, 1966)

Career AFL statistics
- Games played: 92
- Games started: 55
- Stats at Pro Football Reference

Curtis Karl Merz (April 17, 1938 – April 22, 2022) was a former college and professional American football guard who played seven seasons in the American Football League (AFL) from 1962–1968. He started for the 1966 AFL Champion Kansas City Chiefs and in Super Bowl I.

Born in Newark, New Jersey, Merz was raised in Springfield Township, Union County, New Jersey, and played prep football at Jonathan Dayton High School.

Merz also played one season in the Canadian Football League (CFL) with the 1960 Grey Cup champion Ottawa Rough Riders.

After his football career, Merz became a Kansas City broadcaster where he did a morning talk show in 1986. Rush Limbaugh did a segment for the show. The station was KMBZ.

== See also ==
- Other American Football League players
