= Al Goldstein (American football) =

American football player (1936–1991)

No. 81
- Position: End

Personal information
- Born: January 8, 1936; Brooklyn, New York, U.S.
- Died: October 14, 1991 (aged 55); West Bloomfield, Michigan, U.S.
- Listed height: 6 ft 0 in (1.83 m)
- Listed weight: 204 lb (93 kg)

Career information
- High school: Lafayette (Brooklyn)
- College: North Carolina
- NFL draft: 1959: 10th round, 117th overall pick
- AFL draft: 1960: 1st round

Career history
- Oakland Raiders (1960)

Awards and highlights
- First-team All-American (1958); First-team All-ACC (1958); Second-team All-ACC (1959)

Career AFL statistics
- Receptions: 27
- Receiving yards: 354
- Total touchdowns: 2
- Stats at Pro Football Reference

Alan Goldstein (January 8, 1936 – October 14, 1991) was an American football player. He was a first-team All-American end at the University of North Carolina at Chapel Hill in 1958 and played professional football for the Oakland Raiders during their inaugural 1960 season.

Goldstein was born and raised in Brooklyn, New York, and graduated from Lafayette High School. He then attended the University of North Carolina where he played college football at the end position for the North Carolina Tar Heels football team from 1957 to 1959. As a junior, he was selected by the Football Writers Association of America and the Newspaper Enterprise Association as a first-team end on their respective 1958 College Football All-America Teams.

Goldstein was drafted by the Los Angeles Rams in the 10th round of the 1959 NFL draft. He opted instead to play in the newly formed American Football League. He appeared in 14 games for the Oakland Raiders during the inaugural 1960 AFL season, compiling 27 receptions for 354 yards and one touchdown. He died in 1991 at age 55 in West Bloomfield, Michigan.
