= Jim Colvin =

American football player (1937–2019)

No. 67, 75, 77, 72
- Positions: Defensive tackle, defensive end, guard

Personal information
- Born: November 30, 1937; Monahans, Texas, U.S.
- Died: August 30, 2019 (aged 81); Uvalde, Texas, U.S.
- Listed height: 6 ft 3 in (1.91 m)
- Listed weight: 252 lb (114 kg)

Career information
- High school: Lutcher-Stark (Orange, Texas)
- College: Houston
- NFL draft: 1960: 8th round, 95th overall pick
- AFL draft: 1960

Career history
- Baltimore Colts (1960–1963); Dallas Cowboys (1964–1966); Green Bay Packers (1967)*; Minnesota Vikings (1967)*; New York Giants (1967)
- * Offseason or practice squad member only

Awards and highlights
- All-MVC (1959)

Career NFL statistics
- Fumble recoveries: 9
- Safeties: 1
- Sacks: 28.5
- Stats at Pro Football Reference

James Reginald Colvin (November 30, 1937 – August 30, 2019) was an American professional football defensive tackle in the National Football League (NFL) for the Baltimore Colts, Dallas Cowboys, and New York Giants. He played college football at the University of Houston.

== Early life ==
Colvin attended Lutcher-Stark High School. He accepted a football scholarship from the University of Houston. He was a two-way player and received All-MVC honors in 1959.

== Professional career ==
=== Baltimore Colts ===
He was selected in the eighth round (95th overall) of the 1960 NFL draft. As a rookie, he was moved between offensive guard and defensive tackle. In 1961, he was used as a backup defensive tackle. In 1962, he was named the starter at left defensive tackle, replacing a recently retired Art Donovan.

On July 11, 1964, he was traded to the Dallas Cowboys in exchange for defensive tackle Guy Reese.

=== Dallas Cowboys ===
Colvin took over Reese's left defensive tackle starting job, playing alongside Bob Lilly for three years.

In 1966, he was limited recovering from offseason surgery to repair a ligament injury. At the end of the season, Jethro Pugh was moved from defensive end to left defensive tackle, replacing Colvin in the starting lineup.

After notifying the club of his intentions to retire, he was traded to the Minnesota Vikings, before receiving him back and trading him again on October 11, 1967, to the New York Giants in exchange for a fourth round draft choice (#97-John Douglas).

=== Minnesota Vikings ===
Colvin spent a part of the 1967 preseason with the Minnesota Vikings, who were looking to add depth after Carl Eller injured his knee, but was returned to the Cowboys after he couldn't play because of an injured knee.

=== New York Giants ===
In 1967, he played 8 games for the New York Giants. On July 22, 1968, he announced his retirement after the Giants did not meet his financial terms.

== Personal life ==
After retiring from football, he owned several car dealerships. He died on August 30, 2019.
