= Harvey White (American football) =

American football player (1938–2021)

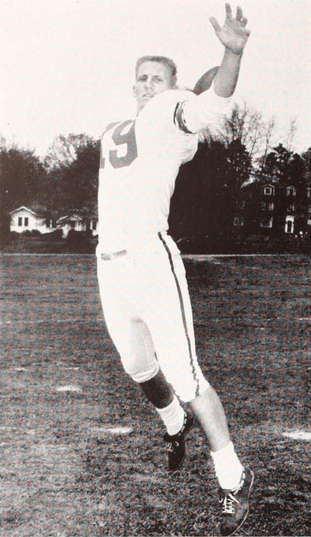
- White at Clemson in 1957

No. 10
- Position: Quarterback

Personal information
- Born: March 3, 1938
- Died: November 6, 2021 (aged 83)

Career information
- College: Clemson
- AFL draft: 1960: 2nd round

Career history
- 1960: Boston Patriots

Awards and highlights
- First-team All-ACC (1957); 2× Second-team All-ACC (1958, 1959)

Career AFL statistics
- TD–INT: 0-0
- Yards: 44
- Passer rating: 64
- Stats at Pro Football Reference

Harvey Talbert White (March 3, 1938 – November 6, 2021) was an American collegiate and professional football quarterback who played for the American Football League (AFL)'s Boston Patriots. He was the first person to sign a Patriots contract on December 20, 1959. He played in three games for the Patriots in 1960.

== See also ==
- Other American Football League players
