= Fred Cole (gridiron football) =

American gridiron football player (1937–2013)

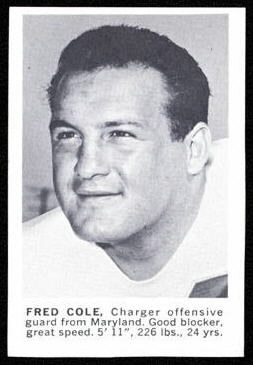

No. 61, 66, 73
- Position: Guard

Personal information
- Born: June 14, 1937; Newark, New Jersey, U.S.
- Died: October 11, 2013 (aged 76); Brick Township, New Jersey, U.S.
- Listed height: 6 ft 0 in (1.83 m)
- Listed weight: 226 lb (103 kg)

Career information
- High school: West Side (Newark)
- College: Maryland
- NFL draft: 1959: 6th round, 68th overall pick

Career history
- Winnipeg Blue Bombers (1959); Los Angeles Chargers (1960); Newark Bears (1963)

Awards and highlights
- Grey Cup champion (1959); Second-team All-ACC (1958)

Career AFL statistics
- Games played: 14
- Games started: 14
- Stats at Pro Football Reference

Frederick Michael Cole (June 14, 1937 – October 11, 2013) was an American professional football player. He played college football with the University of Maryland Terrapins. He played for the Winnipeg Blue Bombers of the Western Interprovincial Football Union in 1959, winning the Grey Cup. Cole was also drafted in the 1959 NFL draft by the Chicago Bears (Round 6, #68 overall). After playing with Winnipeg, he also played a single season with the Los Angeles Chargers of the American Football League (AFL). He later played for the Newark Bears of the Atlantic Coast Football League in 1963. He died in his native state of New Jersey in 2013.
