= Jon Gilliam =

American football player (1938–2020)

No. 65
- Position: Center

Personal information
- Born: October 22, 1938; Oklahoma City, Oklahoma, U.S.
- Died: July 2, 2020 (aged 81); Granbury, Texas, U.S.
- Listed height: 6 ft 2 in (1.88 m)
- Listed weight: 240 lb (109 kg)

Career information
- High school: Hillcrest (Dallas, Texas)
- College: Oklahoma State; Texas A&M Commerce
- NFL draft: 1960: 14th round, 161st overall pick
- AFL draft: 1960

Career history
- Dallas Texans/Kansas City Chiefs (1961-1967)

Awards and highlights
- 2× AFL champion (1962, 1966); AFL All-Star (1961)

Career AFL statistics
- Games played: 76
- Games started: 73
- Stats at Pro Football Reference

Jon Ray Gilliam (October 22, 1938 – July 2, 2020) was an American college and professional football center who played seven seasons in the American Football League (AFL) from 1962-1968. He played for the 1962 AFL Champion Dallas Texans (in their last season before relocating to Kansas City as the Kansas City Chiefs) and the 1966 AFL Champion Kansas City Chiefs, who went on to face the NFL Champion Green Bay Packers in the first AFL-NFL World Championship Game, Super Bowl I.

In his rookie season, he was selected for the AFL All-Star Game squad as a linebacker.

He died on July 2, 2020, in Granbury, Texas at age 81.
