= Doug Cline =

American football player (1938–1995)

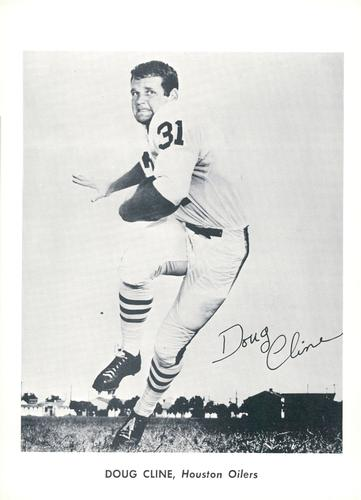
- Cline with the Houston Oilers in 1961

No. 31, 58
- Positions: Linebacker, fullback

Personal information
- Born: March 22, 1938; Valdese, North Carolina, U.S.
- Died: October 10, 1995 (aged 57); Rutherford College, North Carolina, U.S.
- Listed height: 6 ft 2 in (1.88 m)
- Listed weight: 230 lb (104 kg)

Career information
- High school: Valdese (NC)
- College: Clemson (1956–1959)
- NFL draft: 1960: 14th round, 168th overall pick
- AFL draft: 1960

Career history
- Houston Oilers (1960-1966); San Diego Chargers (1966)

Awards and highlights
- 2× AFL champion (1960, 1961); Second-team All-ACC (1959)

Career AFL statistics
- Interceptions: 7
- Total touchdowns: 5
- Sacks: 11
- Stats at Pro Football Reference

Charles Douglas Cline (March 22, 1938 – October 10, 1995) was an American professional football player who was a linebacker for seven seasons for the Houston Oilers and the San Diego Chargers of the American Football League (AFL).

== Career ==
Cline played in 95 career games, all but two with the Oilers. He rushed for 105 yards on 37 carries for 2 touchdowns and caught 4 passes for 15 yards in his first season, the only one where he was used on offense. He had 7 interceptions for 77 return yards while causing 2 fumbles.

In the 1961 AFL title game, he had an interception. He returned 4 kick returns for 66 total yards during his career. He was named to the 2nd All-AFL Team in 1962 by the Associated Press and UPI and in 1963 by the Associated Press, NY Daily News and UPI.

== Honors ==
Cline is a member of the Clemson University Athletic Hall of Fame and Burke County Sports Hall of Fame.
