= Mike Magac =

American football player (1938–2003)

- Magac in 1961

No. 62, 68
- Position: Guard

Personal information
- Born: May 25, 1938; East St. Louis, Illinois, U.S.
- Died: August 25, 2003 (aged 65)
- Listed height: 6 ft 3 in (1.91 m)
- Listed weight: 240 lb (109 kg)

Career information
- High school: Assumption (East St. Louis)
- College: Missouri
- NFL draft: 1960: 2nd round, 16th overall pick
- AFL draft: 1960: 2nd round

Career history
- San Francisco 49ers (1960–1964); Pittsburgh Steelers (1965–1966)

Awards and highlights
- Second-team All-American (1959); First-team All-Big Eight (1959); Second-team All-Big Eight (1958)

Career NFL statistics
- Games played: 78
- Starts: 41
- Fumble recoveries: 3
- Stats at Pro Football Reference

Michael Stephen Magac Jr. (Pronounced: "MAY-jack") (May 25, 1938 – August 25, 2003) was an American professional football player who was a guard in the National Football League (NFL). Selected in the second round of the 1960 NFL draft, Magac played seven seasons for the San Francisco 49ers (1960–1964) and the Pittsburgh Steelers (1965–1966).

== Early life ==
Mike Magac was born May 25, 1938 in East St. Louis, Illinois. He was the son of Michael "Chick" Magac and the former Stella Sawitzki.

He attended Assumption High School, a private Catholic school in East St. Louis from 1952 to 1956, where he earned recognition for his athletic prowess as quarterback of the school football team, while playing defensive tackle and linebacker on the other side of the ball. He was named a member of the Illinois All-State first team as a senior in 1955 and was offered a scholarship to play football as a lineman at the University of Missouri.

== College career ==
Magac was at Missouri from 1956 to 1960. Establishing himself at the tackle position, Magac would be named a team captain go on to earn All-Big 8 Conference and second team All-American honors on the Associated Press and NEA lists during his senior season for the Tigers. That 1959 squad would finish the season with a record of 6–4 and earn a ticket to the 1960 Orange Bowl — a game ultimately lost 14–0 to the University of Georgia.

== Professional career ==
Magac was taken in the second round of the 1960 NFL draft by the San Francisco 49ers, who made him the 16th overall pick of the draft, the fourth offensive lineman selected. He was also chosen by the New York Titans (today's New York Jets) of the fledgling American Football League (AFL) in the second round of their draft.

His opportunity to start for the 49ers came quickly, when in the fourth game of the 1960 season starting right guard Ted Connolly was injured. Magac would start all eight remaining games of his rookie campaign.

During his second season, Magac only saw action is half the year's slate, six games, starting in two. In 1962 he was back to a regular role, however, starting at left guard in all 14 games.

Magac was relegated by the 49ers to a reserve role in 1963 and 1964, though, starting just one time of the 28 games played by the team in that interval. This made the former All-American expendable and in 1965 Magac's contract was traded to the Pittsburgh Steelers for a 1967 third round draft choice. The 49ers ultimately used this pick to acquire University of Michigan linebacker Frank Nunley.

Magac would play on the offensive line two years for the Steelers, including all 14 games as starting right guard in 1966, his final season in football.

== Life after football ==
After his career in football ended, Magac was an iron worker in East St. Louis, ultimately retiring as a member of Iron Workers Union Local 392.

Magac died August 25, 2003, at Memorial Hospital in Belleville, Illinois. He was survived by two sons and three step-children. His body was interred at Mt. Carmel Cemetery in Belleville.
