= Gary Campbell (quarterback) =

American football player (born c. 1936)

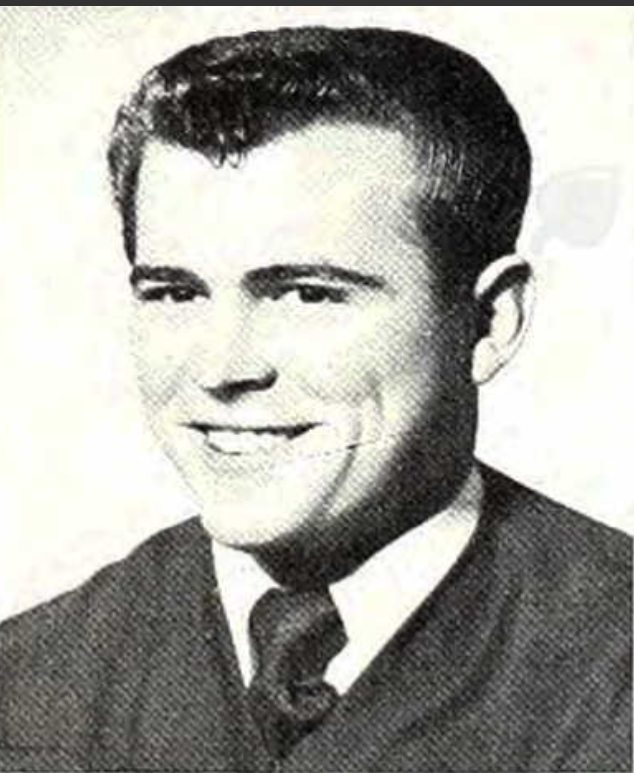
- Gary Campbell, 1955

Profile
- Positions: Quarterback, halfback

Personal information
- Born: c. 1936

Career information
- High school: Whittier High School
- College: Whittier (1956, 1958–1959)

Gary Campbell (born c. 1936) is an American former football quarterback and halfback for the Whittier Poets. He led the country in pass completion percentage in both 1958 and 1959 and also led the country in total offense in 1959.

== Early life ==
Campbell began his football career as a tailback at Whittier High School in 1953 and 1954. He then played one year at Fullerton Junior College.

== Whittier College ==
Campbell transferred to Whittier College in 1956. He played at the halfback position in 1956 and sat out the 1957 season. As a junior in 1958, he led the nation with a .626 completion percentage (completing 87 of 139 passes for 1,237 yards) and ranked second nationally, among both major and small college players, with 1,659 yards of total offense.

As a senior in 1959, Campbell was converted to the quarterback position by Whittier coach Don Coryell. Campbell led all college football players in 1959 with 2,383 yards of total offense. At the time, his 2,383 yards ranked fourth in college football history. His per game average of 238.3 yards per game was more than 50 yards per game more than the runner up. He also had the best pass completion rate at .607.

== Later life ==
Campbell was selected by the San Francisco 49ers with the 166th overall pick in the 1960 NFL draft.
