= 1960 American Football League draft =

American Football League draft

1960 AFL draft

General information
- Dates: November 22–23, 1959 & December 2, 1959
- Location: Nicollet Hotel in Minneapolis

Overview
- League: AFL

The 1960 American Football League draft was held on November 22–23, 1959, in Minneapolis, shortly after the organization of the league, and lasted 33 rounds. An additional draft of 20 rounds was held by the AFL on December 2.

Teams were required to fill the 11 squad positions by selecting four backs, two ends, two tackles, two guards, and a center with their first 11 picks. Before each position was selected, teams drew lots to determine the selection order. Though professional teams used dedicated offensive and defensive units, the league did not want to go 22 rounds before starting unrestricted drafting.

== Territorial draft ==
To begin the draft, each of the eight teams were awarded a territorial or "bonus" selection to guarantee a local flavor that would boost the financial prospects of each franchise. These regional picks did not follow a specific order. Rather, they were mutually agreed upon by the other teams.

AFL team	Player	Position	College	Notes
Boston Patriots	Gerhard Schwedes	Halfback	Syracuse	
Buffalo Bills	Richie Lucas	Quarterback	Penn State	1959 Maxwell Award winner.
Dallas Texans	Don Meredith	Quarterback	SMU	Did not sign.
Denver Broncos	Roger LeClerc	Center	Trinity (CT)	Did not sign.
Houston Oilers	Billy Cannon	Halfback	LSU	1959 Heisman Trophy winner.
Los Angeles Chargers	Monty Stickles	End	Notre Dame	Did not sign.
New York Titans	George Izo	Quarterback	Notre Dame	Did not sign.
Minneapolis team (Note: When the Minneapolis team withdrew from the league to join the NFL, their draft picks were assigned to the Oakland Raiders that replaced them. See § Allocation draft for more details.)	Dale Hackbart	Quarterback	Wisconsin	Did not sign.

== Regular draft ==
=== First selections ===
After the territorial picks, a consensus was reached on the top eight players at each position—at the time, college players were typically categorized by their offensive positions only. The names for each position were then placed in a hat and randomly drawn by each team. This process repeated until each franchise had made 33 selections, or three full offensive units. Those selections were considered as the first round of the draft.

^{†}	= AFL All-Star (Note: Players are identified as an All-Star if they were selected for the All-Star team at any time in their career.)	= Pro Bowler (Note: Players are identified as a Pro Bowler if they were selected for the Pro-Bowl at any time in their career.)	= Hall of Famer

==== Boston Patriots ====
Player	Position	College	Notes
Buddy Allen	Halfback	Utah State	Did not sign.
Ron Burton	Halfback	Northwestern	
Dale Chamberlain	Fullback	Miami (OH)	
Henry Christopher	End	SMU	
Dan Colchico	End	San Jose State	Did not sign.
Jack Cummings	Quarterback	NC State	
James Davis	Center	Oklahoma	
Foge Fazio	Center	Pittsburgh	Did not sign.
Max Fugler	Center	LSU	Did not sign.
Tim Gardner	Tackle	Duke	
James Goodyear	Tackle	Wake Forest	
Dave Harris	Halfback	Kansas	
Al Henderson	Tackle	Colorado State	
Jim Hickman	Tackle	Penn State	
Bob Kranz	Fullback	Penn State	
Joe Kulbacki	Halfback	Purdue	
Dee Mackey	End	East Texas State	Did not sign.
Leon Manley	Guard	West Texas State	
Cliff Manning	Tackle	Hardin–Simmons	
Pete Manning	End	Wake Forest	Did not sign.
Ed Mazurek	Tackle	Xavier	
Bill Meglen	Guard	Utah State	
Frank Mestnik	Fullback	Marquette	Did not sign.
Ron Mix	Tackle	USC	Rights traded to the Chargers.
Irv Nikolai	End	Stanford	
Jim Prestel	Tackle	Idaho	Did not sign.
Bob Salerno	Guard	Colorado	
Dick Soergel	Quarterback	Oklahoma State	
Larry Wagner	Tackle	Vanderbilt	
Harvey White	Quarterback	Clemson	
Tirey Wilemon	Halfback	SMU	
Gary Wisener	End	Baylor	Did not sign.

==== Buffalo Bills ====
Player	Position	College	Notes
Birtho Arnold	Tackle	Ohio State	
Charlie Bivins	Halfback	Morris Brown	Did not sign.
Don Black	End	New Mexico	
Bill Burrell	Guard	Illinois	Did not sign.
Paul Choquette	Fullback	Brown	
Mike Connelly	Center	Utah State	Did not sign.
Jim Conroy	Fullback	USC	Did not sign.
Bob Coogan	Tackle	Utah	
Lou Cordileone	Tackle	Clemson	Did not sign.
Ted Dean	Fullback	Wichita	Did not sign.
Willie Evans	Halfback	Buffalo	
Ross Fichtner	Quarterback	Purdue	Did not sign.
Jon Gilliam	Center	East Texas State	
Al Goldstein	End	North Carolina	Redrafted by the Raiders.
Jim Houston	End	Ohio State	Did not sign.
Ray Jauch	Halfback	Iowa	Did not sign.
Robert Khayat	Tackle	Ole Miss	Did not sign.
Ken Kirk	Center	Ole Miss	Did not sign.
Jim Leo	End	Cincinnati	Did not sign.
Chuck McMurtry^{†}	Tackle	Whittier	
Bubba Meyer	End	TCU	
Ron Miller	End	Vanderbilt	
Gale Oliver	Tackle	Texas A&M	
Harold Olson^{†}	Tackle	Clemson	
Ray Peterson	Halfback	West Virginia	
Vince Promuto	Guard	Holy Cross	Did not sign.
Rene Ramirez	Halfback	Texas	
Len Rohde	Tackle	Utah State	Did not sign.
Joe Schaffer	Tackle	Tennessee	
Wayne Schneider	Halfback	Colorado State	
Ivan Toncic	Quarterback	Pittsburgh	
Larry Wilson	Halfback	Utah	Did not sign.

==== Dallas Texans ====
Player	Position	College	Notes
Jack Atchason	End	Western Illinois	
George Boone	Tackle	Kentucky	
Chris Burford^{†}	End	Stanford	
Earl Ray Butler	Tackle	North Carolina	
Gail Cogdill	End	Washington State	Did not sign.
Jim Crotty	Halfback	Notre Dame	Did not sign.
Gary Ferguson	Tackle	SMU	
Tom Glynn	Center	Boston College	
Gene Gossage	Tackle	Northwestern	Did not sign.
Jim Heineke	Tackle	Wisconsin	
William Jerry	Tackle	South Carolina	
John Kapele	Tackle	BYU	Did not sign.
Louis Kelley	Fullback	New Mexico State	
Gilmer Lewis	Tackle	Oklahoma	
John Malmberg	Tackle	Knox	
Arvie Martin	Center	TCU	
Tom Moore	Halfback	Vanderbilt	Did not sign.
Ola Lee Murchison	End	Pacific	
Bob Nelson	Center	Wisconsin	
Jim Norton^{†}	End	Idaho	
Warren Rabb	Quarterback	LSU	Did not sign.
Howard Ringwood	Halfback	BYU	
Johnny Robinson	Halfback	LSU	
John Saunders	Fullback	South Carolina	
Glenn Shaw	Fullback	Kentucky	Did not sign.
Gordon Speer	Halfback	Rice	
Jack Stone	Guard	Oregon	
Marvin Terrell^{†}	Guard	Ole Miss	
Emery Turner	Guard	Purdue	
Joe Vader	End	Kansas State	
Carroll Zaruba	Halfback	Nebraska	

==== Denver Broncos ====
Player	Position	College	Notes
Harry Ball	Tackle	Boston College	
Charley Britt	Quarterback	Georgia	Did not sign.
Dave Canary	End	Cincinnati	
Paul Candro	Halfback	Boston University	
Bill Carrico	Guard	North Texas State	
Larry Cundiff	Center	Michigan State	
Bernard Darre	Tackle	Tulane	
Roger Davis	Tackle	Syracuse	Did not sign.
Lonnie Dennis	Guard	BYU	Did not sign.
John Dingens	Tackle	Detroit	
Maurice Doke	Guard	Texas	Did not sign.
Mike Dowdle	Fullback	Texas	Did not sign.
Wayne Hawkins^{†}	Tackle	Pacific	Redrafted by the Raiders.
Gary Huber	Center	Miami (OH)	
Dave Hudson	End	Florida	
Claude King	Halfback	Louisville	
Don Klochak	Fullback	North Carolina	
Dean Look	Quarterback	Michigan State	
Bill Mathis^{†}	Halfback	Clemson	
Ken McNeece	Tackle	San Jose State	
James Monroe	Quarterback	Arkansas	
Ray Norton	Halfback	San Jose State	Did not sign.
Bob Rosbaugh	Halfback	Miami (FL)	
Mel Semenko	End	Colorado	Did not sign.
Lebron Shields	Tackle	Tennessee	Did not sign.
Jack Spikes	Fullback	TCU	
Howard Turley	End	Louisville	
Jim Walden	Quarterback	Wyoming	Did not sign.
Willie West^{†}	Halfback	Oregon	Did not sign.
John Willener	Guard	Oregon	
Bob Yates	Tackle	Syracuse	
Ken Young	End	Valparaiso	
Bob Zimpfer	Tackle	Bowling Green	

==== Houston Oilers ====
Player	Position	College	Notes
Pete Arena	Guard	Northwestern	
Dick Bass	Halfback	Pacific	Did not sign.
Bill Bohler	End / Tackle	St. Ambrose	
Larry Cadwell	Guard	Louisville	
Doug Cline	Fullback	Clemson	
DeJustice Coleman	Halfback	Illinois	
Bob Crandall	Halfback	New Mexico	
Cleatus Drinnon	Center	Hardin–Simmons	
John Gremer	Guard	Illinois	
George Herring	Guard	North Texas State	
Don Hitt	Center	Oklahoma State	
Steve Johnson	Quarterback	Pepperdine	
John Lands	End	Montana	
Jacky Lee	Quarterback	Cincinnati	
Bruce Maher	Halfback	Detroit	Did not sign.
Don Mattson	Tackle	USC	
Mike McGee	Guard	Duke	Did not sign.
Hugh McInnis	End	Mississippi Southern	Did not sign.
Max Messner	Tackle	Cincinnati	Did not sign.
George Mulholland	End	New Mexico State	
Gary O'Steen	Halfback	Alabama	
Gene Prebola	End	Boston University	Redrafted by the Raiders.
Palmer Pyle	Tackle	Michigan State	Did not sign.
William Roach	Tackle	TCU	
Bob Simms	End	Rutgers	Did not sign.
Philip Snowden	Quarterback	Ole Miss	
Don Underwood	Guard	McNeese State	
Duane Whetstone	Fullback	George Washington	
Bob White	Fullback	Ohio State	
Maury Youmans	Tackle	Syracuse	Did not sign.

==== Los Angeles Chargers ====
Player	Position	College	Notes
Ted Aucreman	End	Indiana	
Bob Bercich	Halfback	Michigan State	Did not sign.
Barney Berlinger	End	Penn	Did not sign.
Charley Boone	Center	Richmond	
Bobby Boyd	Quarterback	Oklahoma	Did not sign.
Byron Bradfute	Tackle	Mississippi Southern	Did not sign.
Rod Breedlove	Guard	Maryland	Did not sign.
Tom Budrewicz	Tackle	Brown	
Jim Cameron	Center	East Texas State	
Jake Crouthamel	Halfback	Dartmouth	Did not sign.
Pete Davidson	Tackle	The Citadel	
Floyd Faucette	Halfback	Georgia Tech	
Bobby Franklin	Quarterback	Ole Miss	Did not sign.
Charlie Flowers	Fullback	Ole Miss	
Don Horn	Fullback	Iowa	
Bob Jeter	Halfback	Iowa	Did not sign.
Bill Lindner	Tackle	Pittsburgh	
Billy Ray Locklin	Tackle	New Mexico State	
Bill Lopasky	Guard	West Virginia	
Paul Maguire^{†}	End	The Citadel	
Wahoo McDaniel	End	Oklahoma	
Charlie Milstead	Quarterback	Texas A&M	
Ed Pitts	Tackle	South Carolina	
Ed Serieka	Fullback	Xavier	
Bob Scholtz	Center	Notre Dame	Did not sign.
Russ Sloan	End	Missouri	
Ron Stehouwer	Tackle	Colorado State	Did not sign.
Wayne Stewart	Guard	The Citadel	
John Stolte	Tackle	Kansas City	
Leonard Wilson	Halfback	Purdue	
Bob Zeman^{†}	Halfback	Wisconsin	

==== Minneapolis team ====
Player	Position	College	Notes
Jim Andreotti	Center	Northwestern	Signed with the CFL.
Maxie Baughan	Center	Georgia Tech	Signed with the NFL.
George Blanch	Halfback	Texas	Signed with the Oilers.
Clord Boyette	Tackle	Texas Southern	
Willie Boykin	Tackle	Michigan State	
Carmen Cavalli	End	Richmond	
Jim Chastain	Tackle	Michigan State	
Fran Curci	Quarterback	Miami (FL)	Signed with the Oilers.
Carroll Dale	End	Virginia Tech	
Purcell Daniels	Fullback	Pepperdine	Signed with the Oilers.
Don Deskins	Tackle	Michigan	Signed with the Chargers.
Leon Dombrowski	Tackle	Delaware	Signed with the Titans.
Ken Fitch	Tackle	Kansas	
Abner Haynes^{†}	Halfback	North Texas State	Signed with the Texans.
Vin Hogan	Halfback	Boston College	
Bob Jarus	Halfback	Purdue	
Earl Kohlhaas	Guard	Penn State	
Bobby Lackey	Quarterback	Texas	Did not sign.
Neil MacLean	Fullback	Wake Forest	
Larry Muff	End	St. Benedict's	
Don Norton^{†}	End	Iowa	Signed with the Chargers.
Jim O'Brien	Tackle	Boston College	
Chuck Pollard	End	Rice	
Billy Roland	Guard	Georgia	
Ray Smith	Fullback	UCLA	Signed with the CFL.
Wade Smith	Halfback	North Carolina	
Jerry Stalcup	Guard	Wisconsin	Signed with the NFL.
John Wilcox	Tackle	Oregon	Signed with the NFL.
Al Witcher	End	Baylor	Signed with the Oilers.
Silas Woods	Halfback	Marquette	
Mike Wright	Tackle	Minnesota	

==== New York Titans ====
Player	Position	College	Notes
Lewis Akin	End	Vanderbilt	
Chuck Allen	Tackle	Alabama	
Bill Bucek	Halfback	Rice	
Jackie Burkett	Center	Auburn	Did not sign.
Angelo Coia	Halfback	USC	Did not sign.
Jim Eifrid	Center	Colorado State	
Don Ellersick	End	Washington State	Did not sign.
Prentice Gautt	Fullback	Oklahoma	Did not sign.
George Genyk	Guard	Michigan	
Larry Grantham^{†}	End	Ole Miss	
Joe Graybeal	Center	Eastern Kentucky	
Jack Groner	Quarterback	Washington & Lee	
Ed Kaohelaulii	Tackle	Oregon State	
Ed Kovac	Halfback	Cincinnati	
Mike Magac	Tackle	Missouri	Did not sign.
Blanche Martin	Fullback	Michigan State	
Curt Merz	End	Iowa	
Ed Meyer	Tackle	West Texas State	Did not sign.
Gene Miller	Tackle	Rice	
Jim Mooty	Halfback	Arkansas	Did not sign.
Mike Morin	Halfback	Knox	
Nick Patella	Guard	Wake Forest	
Don Perkins	Halfback	New Mexico	Did not sign.
Dave Ross	End	Los Angeles State	
Roger Smith	Guard	Auburn	
Don Stallings	Tackle	North Carolina	Did not sign.
Larry Stephens	Tackle	Texas	Did not sign.
Jim St. Clair	Quarterback	UC Santa Barbara	
Jim Stinnette	Fullback	Oregon State	
David Wilemon	Tackle	SMU	

=== Second selections ===
The second selections took place two weeks later, on December 2. The process was the same as the first ones, but it consisted of maximum 20 picks in total for each team. This selections were considered as the second round.

==== Boston Patriots ====
Player	Position	College	Notes
David Ames	Halfback	Richmond	
Jim Boeke	Tackle	Heidelberg	Did not sign.
Billy Brewer	Quarterback	Ole Miss	Did not sign.
Emanuel Congedo	Tackle	Villanova	
Pat Dye	Tackle	Georgia	Did not sign.
Bo Farrington	End	Prairie View A&M	Did not sign.
Rich Grecni	Center	Ohio	
Bud Jones	End	SMU	
Don Kacmarek	Tackle	North Dakota	
John Lawrence	Tackle	NC State	
Ron Maltony	Tackle	Purdue	
Bobby Pate	Halfback	Presbyterian	Did not sign.
Jack Rudolph	Linebacker	Georgia Tech	
Frank Sally	Tackle	California	
Bob Spada	End	Duke	
Pete Tunney	Halfback	Occidental	
Jim Brewster	Halfback	Marquette	
John Wilcox	Tackle	Oregon	Did not sign.

==== Buffalo Bills ====
Player	Position	College	Notes
Dwight Bumgarner	End	Duke	
Tom Day^{†}	Tackle	North Carolina A&T	Did not sign.
Babe Dreymala	Tackle	Texas	
Joe Gomes	Halfback	South Carolina	
Mike Graney	End	Notre Dame	
Pete Hall	Quarterback	Marquette	Did not sign.
Jim Hanna	End	USC	
Ernie Hanson	Center	Arizona State–Flagstaff	
Darrell Harper	Halfback	Michigan	
John Littlejohn	Halfback	Kansas State	
Marv Luster	End	UCLA	Did not sign.
Dwight Nichols	Halfback	Iowa State	Did not sign.
Merlin Priddy	Halfback	TCU	
Harry Rakowski	Halfback	The Citadel	
Dale Rems	Tackle	Purdue	
Carl Robison	Tackle	South Carolina State	
Bob Silva	Tackle	Stephen F. Austin	
James Sorey	Tackle	Texas Southern	
Jerry Thompson	Tackle	Oklahoma	
Royce Whittington	Tackle	Southeastern Louisiana	

==== Dallas Texans ====
Player	Position	College	Notes
Grady Alderman	Tackle	Detroit	Did not sign.
Herman Alexander	Tackle	Findlay	
Taz Anderson	Halfback	Georgia Tech	Did not sign.
Jim Beaver	Tackle	Florida	
Bill Beck	Tackle	Gustavus Adolphus	
Doug Pat Brown	Tackle	Fresno State	
Gary Campbell	Halfback	Whittier	Did not sign.
Vernon Cole	Quarterback	North Texas State	Did not sign.
Toby Deese	Tackle	Georgia Tech	
Carl Dumbald	Tackle	West Virginia	
Charley Flizey	Center	Mississippi Southern	
Tom Gates	Halfback	San Bernardino Valley	
Goose Gonsoulin^{†}	Halfback	Baylor	
Clark Holden	Halfback	USC	
Dewitt Hoopes	Tackle	Northwestern	
Don Leebern	Tackle	Georgia	
Bill Thompson	Center	Georgia	
Billy Tranum	End	Arkansas	
Jim Vickers	End	Georgia	
Larry Ward	End	Lamar Tech	
Paul Winslow	Halfback	North Carolina College	Did not sign.

==== Denver Broncos ====
Player	Position	College	Notes
Mel Branch^{†}	Tackle	LSU	
Ronnie Cain	End	Kentucky	
Jack Campbell	End	Toledo	
Tom Chapman	End	Detroit	
LeVelle Coleman	Halfback	Western Michigan	
Jim Colvin	Tackle	Houston	Did not sign.
Teddy Foret	Tackle	Auburn	
Bobby Joe Green	Halfback	Florida	Did not sign.
George Hershberger	Tackle	Wichita	
Sam Horner	Halfback	VMI	Did not sign.
Bob Hudson	End	Lamar Tech	
Vic Jones	Halfback	Indiana	
Billy Luplow	Tackle	Arkansas	
George Phelps	Halfback	Cornell (IA)	
Tom Roberts	Tackle	Georgia Tech	
Sam Stenger	Center	Denver	
Olin Treadway	Quarterback	Iowa	
John Wilkins	Tackle	USC	
Emmet Wilson	Tackle	Georgia Tech	

==== Houston Oilers ====
Player	Position	College	Notes
Clair Branch	Halfback	Texas	Did not sign.
Dave Chamberlain	Halfback	Miami (OH)	
Don Cochran	Tackle	Alabama	
Stan Fanning	Tackle	Idaho	Did not sign.
Jim Glasgow	Tackle	Jackson State	
Dave Graham	End	Virginia	Did not sign.
Bob Haas	Halfback	Missouri	
Lowell Hughes	Quarterback	Kent State	
Dale Johannson	Tackle	Augustana (SD)	
Jim Marshall	Tackle	Ohio State	Did not sign.
Ron Morrison	Tackle	New Mexico	
Jerry Muennink	Center	Texas	
Paul Oglesby	Tackle	UCLA	
John Peppercorn	End	Kansas	
Bob Peterson	Center	Oregon	
Bob Talamini^{†}	Tackle	Kentucky	
Bob Towns	End	Georgia	
Bob Wasden	End	Auburn	
Jim Welch	Halfback	SMU	Did not sign.
Jim Wolff	Halfback	Panhandle A&M	

==== Los Angeles Chargers ====
Player	Position	College	Notes
Jerry Beabout	Tackle	Purdue	
George Blair^{†}	Halfback	Ole Miss	
Frank Brixius	Tackle	Minnesota	
Joe Davis	Tackle	The Citadel	
Bob DeMarco	Guard	Dayton	Did not sign.
Bob Hain	Tackle	Iowa	
Chuck Janssen	Tackle	Tulsa	
Gorden Kelley	End	Georgia	Did not sign.
Larry Lancaster	Guard	Georgia	Redrafted by the Raiders.
Marv Lasater	Halfback	TCU	
Warren Lashua	End	Whitworth	
Perry McGriff	End	Florida	
Kirk Phares	Tackle	South Carolina	
Lamar Rawson	Halfback	Auburn	
Ronald Ray	Tackle	Howard Payne	
Ken Talkington	Quarterback	Texas Tech	
John Talley	Quarterback	Northwestern	
Bobby Waters	Halfback	Presbyterian	
Bob Wehking	Center	Florida	
Larry Womack	Halfback	Colorado State	

==== Minneapolis team ====
Player	Position	College	Notes
C. J. Alexander	Halfback	Southeastern Louisiana	
Pervis Atkins	Halfback	New Mexico State	Signed with the NFL.
Al Bansavage	Tackle	USC	Signed with the Chargers.
Walter Beach	Halfback	Central Michigan	Signed with the Patriots.
Johnny Brewer	End	Ole Miss	Signed with the NFL.
Dan Edgington	End	Florida	
Howard Evans	Center	Houston	
Fred Hageman	Center	Kansas	Signed with the NFL.
Bill Herron	End	Georgia	
Bob Hogue	Tackle	Shepherd	
Gerald Lambert	Tackle	Texas A&I	
Sam McCord	Quarterback	East Texas State	
Rich Mostardi	Halfback	Kent State	Signed with the NFL.
Bob Parker	Tackle	East Texas State	
Tony Polychronis	Tackle	Utah	
Dan Sheehan	Tackle	Chattanooga	
Howard Turley	End	Louisville	
Jim Williams	Tackle	North Carolina College	
Jim Woodard	Tackle	Lamar Tech	

==== New York Titans ====
Player	Position	College	Notes
Pete Abadie	End	Tulane	
Ramon Armstrong	Tackle	TCU	Redrafted by the Raiders.
Dave Baker	End	Syracuse	
Richard Brooks	End	Purdue	
Roger Brown	Tackle	Maryland State	Did not sign.
Tom Budrewicz	Tackle	Brown	
Bob Colburn	Quarterback	Bowling Green	
Larry Essenmacker	Tackle	Alma	
Jim Gorman	Tackle	McMurry	
Bob Hall	Tackle	Kent State	
Marshall Harris	Halfback	TCU	
Garney Henley	Halfback	Huron	Did not sign.
Jim Hunt	Tackle	Purdue	
Gordon Leboeuf	Halfback	Texas A&M	
Jim Nemeth	Center	South Carolina	
Steve Rasso	Halfback	Cincinnati	
Royce Shelton	Halfback	Stephen F. Austin	
Gary Sknoeckni	End	Syracuse	
Andy Stynchula	Tackle	Penn State	Did not sign.
Frank Walton	Halfback	John Carroll	

^{†}	= AFL All-Star	= Pro Bowler	= Hall of Famer

== Allocation draft ==
After the draft was completed, one of the original teams, Minneapolis (which did not have a nickname), was offered a franchise in the NFL and on January 27, 1960, they withdrew from the AFL, leaving the league with seven teams. Three days later, it was announced that the Oakland Raiders had joined the AFL as the eighth franchise, and then inherited the draft picks of Minneapolis. The problem was that several of the players selected by Minneapolis were signed by NFL, CFL and AFL teams. To solve this issue the AFL held an allocation draft. Each of the other seven AFL teams froze 11 players on their rosters. The remaining players were then eligible for selection by Oakland, which then stockpiled a total of 24 players. The number of players originally drafted for the eighth AFL franchise, but who were signed by other teams, combined with the process of the allocation draft, virtually guaranteed that the Raiders would have the worst team in the AFL in its first year. In spite of this, they managed to sign future stars in center Jim Otto and guard Wayne Hawkins, two men who played the entire ten years of the American Football League.

^{†}	= All-Star

Player	Position	College	AFL team coming from	Notes
Ramon Armstrong	Tackle	TCU	New York Titans	
George Blanch	Halfback	Texas	Houston Oilers	
Joe Cannavino	Defensive back	Ohio State	Buffalo Bills	
Luther Carr	Tackle	Washington	Los Angeles Chargers	
Carmen Cavalli	Defensive end	Richmond	Buffalo Bills	
Donnis Churchwell	Guard	Ole Miss	Houston Oilers	Played in the NFL in 1959.
Fran Curci	Quarterback	Miami (FL)	Houston Oilers	Did not sign.
Purcell Daniels	Defensive back	Pepperdine	Houston Oilers	
Don Deskins	Guard	Michigan	Los Angeles Chargers	
Don Edington	End	Florida	Boston Patriots	
Jerry Epps	Guard	West Texas State	New York Titans	
Al Goldstein	End	North Carolina	Buffalo Bills	
Bob Harrison	Linebacker	Arizona State	Los Angeles Chargers	
Wayne Hawkins^{†}	Guard	Pacific	Denver Broncos	
Clark Holden	Halfback	USC	Dallas Texans	
Stan Jones	Guard	Maryland State	Dallas Texans	
Larry Lancaster	Tackle	Georgia	Los Angeles Chargers	
Billy Lott	Halfback	Ole Miss	Houston Oilers	Played in the NFL in 1958.
Bob Nelson	Center	Wisconsin	Boston Patriots	
Ron Newhouse	Linebacker	Michigan	New York Titans	
Ray Peterson	Halfback	West Virginia	Buffalo Bills	
Gene Prebola	End	Boston University	Houston Oilers	
Mack Starnes	Defensive back	USC	Houston Oilers	
Jim Woodward	Guard	North Carolina College	Houston Oilers	

== Hall of Famers ==
- Los Angeles / San Diego Chargers offensive tackle Ron Mix, drafted as a first selection by the Boston Patriots, then he was traded to Los Angeles. He played 10 years for the Chargers franchise and one season with the Oakland Raiders. Inducted in 1979.
- Oakland Raiders center Jim Otto, signed as an undrafted free agent, he played fifteen seasons for the Raiders. Inducted in 1980.
- Dallas Texans / Kansas City Chiefs safety Johnny Robinson, drafted as a first selection, he played his entire 12-year career with the Chiefs franchise. Inducted in 2019.
- Safety Larry Wilson, drafted as a first selection by the Buffalo Bills, Wilson instead signed with the NFL's St. Louis Cardinals, where he played his entire 13-year career. Inducted in 1978.

== Notable undrafted players ==
^{†}	= All-Star	^{‡}	= Hall of Famer

Original NFL team	Player	Pos.	College	Notes
Boston Patriots	Gino Cappelletti ^{†}	WR/K	Minnesota	
Boston Patriots	Larry Garron ^{†}	FB	Western Illinois	
Boston Patriots	Chuck Leo ^{†}	G	Indiana	
Boston Patriots	Ross O'Hanley ^{†}	S	Boston College	
Boston Patriots	Butch Songin	QB	Boston College	
Buffalo Bills	Elbert Dubenion ^{†}	WR	Bluffton	
Buffalo Bills	Wray Carlton ^{†}	RB	Duke	
Dallas Texans	Walt Corey ^{†}	LB	Miami (FL)	
Dallas Texans	Clem Daniels ^{†}	RB/CB	Prairie View A&M	
Dallas Texans	Sherrill Headrick ^{†}	LB	TCU	
Dallas Texans	Al Reynolds	G	Tarkio	
Dallas Texans	Paul Rochester ^{†}	DT	Michigan State	
Dallas Texans	Stewart Stover	LB	Northeast Louisiana State	
Dallas Texans	Duane Wood ^{†}	CB	Oklahoma State	
Denver Broncos	Ken Adamson ^{†}	TE	Notre Dame	
Denver Broncos	Eldon Danenhauer ^{†}	T	Pittsburg State	
Denver Broncos	Al Day	LB	Eastern Michigan	
Denver Broncos	Gene Mingo ^{†}	RB/K		He did not attend college.
Houston Oilers	Tony Banfield ^{†}	S	Oklahoma State	
Houston Oilers	Bill Groman ^{†}	WR	Heidelberg	
Houston Oilers	Charlie Hennigan ^{†}	WR	Northwestern State	
Houston Oilers	Al Jamison ^{†}	T	Colgate	
Houston Oilers	Mark Johnston ^{†}	CB	Northwestern	
Houston Oilers	Rich Michael ^{†}	T	Ohio State	
Houston Oilers	Charlie Tolar ^{†}	RB	Northwestern State	
Los Angeles Chargers	Dick Harris ^{†}	S	McNeese State	
Los Angeles Chargers	Dave Kocourek ^{†}	TE	Wisconsin	
Los Angeles Chargers	Charlie McNeil ^{†}	S	Compton	
Los Angeles Chargers	Ernie Wright ^{†}	S	Ohio State	
New York Titans	Dick Felt ^{†}	S	BYU	
New York Titans	Bill Mathis ^{†}	RB	Clemson	
Oakland Raiders	Nyle McFarlane	HB	BYU	
Oakland Raiders	Jim Otto^{‡}	C	Miami (FL)	

== See also ==
- List of American Football League players
- History of American Football League draft
- List of professional American football drafts
