= 1959 George Washington Colonials football team =

American college football season

1959 George Washington Colonials football
- Conference: Southern Conference
- Record: 1–8 (0–5 SoCon)
- Head coach: Bo Sherman (8th season)
- Home stadium: Griffith Stadium

1959 Southern Conference football standings
	Conf.					Overall
Team	W		L		T	W		L		T
VMI $	5	–	0	–	1	8	–	1	–	1
The Citadel	5	–	1	–	0	8	–	2	–	0
Virginia Tech	3	–	1	–	0	6	–	4	–	0
Furman	3	–	2	–	0	3	–	7	–	0
Richmond	4	–	3	–	1	4	–	5	–	1
West Virginia	2	–	2	–	0	3	–	7	–	0
William & Mary	2	–	5	–	0	4	–	6	–	0
Davidson	0	–	5	–	0	1	–	8	–	0
George Washington	0	–	5	–	0	1	–	8	–	0
$ – Conference champion; Rankings from AP Poll

The 1959 George Washington Colonials football team was an American football team that represented George Washington University as part of the Southern Conference during the 1959 college football season. In their eighth season under head coach Bo Sherman, the team compiled a 1–8 record (0–5 in the SoCon).

== Schedule ==
Date	Opponent	Site	Result	Attendance	Source
September 18	at Detroit*	University of Detroit Stadium; Detroit, MI	L 6–38	19,609	
September 25	at Boston University*	Boston University Field; Boston, MA	W 18–14		
October 2	West Virginia	Griffith Stadium; Washington, DC	L 8–10	6,000	
October 9	Wichita*	Griffith Stadium; Washington, DC	L 0–21		
October 17	at Furman	Sirrine Stadium; Greenville, SC	L 0–24	5,000	
October 24	at William & Mary	Cary Field; Williamsburg, VA	L 7–14	5,000	
October 30	VMI	Griffith Stadium; Washington, DC	L 6–28	5,000	
November 7	at Richmond	City Stadium; Richmond, VA	L 0–26	1,000	
November 14	at Navy*	Navy–Marine Corps Memorial Stadium; Annapolis, MD	L 8–16	14,000	
*Non-conference game
