= 1959 Clemson Tigers football team =

American college football season

1959 Clemson Tigers football

ACC champion Bluebonnet Bowl champion

Bluebonnet Bowl, W 23–7 vs. TCU
- Conference: Atlantic Coast Conference

Ranking
- Coaches: No. 11
- AP: No. 11
- Record: 9–2 (6–1 ACC)
- Head coach: Frank Howard (20th season)
- Captains: Paul Snyder; Harvey White
- Home stadium: Memorial Stadium

1959 Atlantic Coast Conference football standings
	Conf.					Overall
Team	W		L		T	W		L		T
No. 11 Clemson $	6	–	1	–	0	9	–	2	–	0
North Carolina	5	–	2	–	0	5	–	5	–	0
Maryland	4	–	2	–	0	5	–	5	–	0
South Carolina	4	–	3	–	0	6	–	4	–	0
Wake Forest	4	–	3	–	0	6	–	4	–	0
Duke	2	–	3	–	0	4	–	6	–	0
NC State	0	–	6	–	0	1	–	9	–	0
Virginia	0	–	5	–	0	0	–	10	–	0
$ – Conference champion; Rankings from AP poll

The 1959 Clemson Tigers football team was an American football team that represented Clemson College in the Atlantic Coast Conference (ACC) during the 1959 college football season. In its 20th season under head coach Frank Howard, the team compiled a 9–2 record (6–1 against conference opponents), won the ACC championship, was ranked No. 11 in the final AP and Coaches Polls, defeated TCU in the 1959 Bluebonnet Bowl, and outscored opponents by a total of 285 to 103. The team played its home games at Memorial Stadium in Clemson, South Carolina.

The annual game against South Carolina was played on Thursday at the South Carolina State Fair for the final time. Clemson's 300th win came in the Bluebonnet Bowl against TCU.

Center Bill Thomas was the team captain. The team's statistical leaders included quarterback Harvey White with 770 passing yards, and fullback Doug Cline with 482 rushing yards, and halfback Bill Mathis with 70 points scored (11 touchdowns, 4 extra points).

Tackle Lou Cordileone was selected as a first-team All-American by Time magazine and a third-team All-American by the Associated Press (AP) and United Press International (UPI). Four Clemson players were selected as first-team players on the 1959 All-Atlantic Coast Conference football team: Cordileone; halfback Bill Mathis; end Gary Barnes; and center Paul Snyder.

== Schedule ==
Date	Time	Opponent	Rank	Site	Result	Attendance	Source
September 19	2:00 p.m.	at No. 12 North Carolina	No. 18	Kenan Memorial Stadium; Chapel Hill, NC	W 20–18	43,000	
September 26	1:20 p.m.	at Virginia	No. 5	Scott Stadium; Charlottesville, VA	W 47–0	13,000	
October 3	2:00 p.m.	at No. 7 Georgia Tech*	No. 6	Grant Field; Atlanta, GA (rivalry)	L 6–16	44,174	
October 10	2:00 p.m.	NC State		Memorial Stadium; Clemson, SC (rivalry)	W 23–0	19,000	
October 22	2:00 p.m.	at South Carolina	No. 17	Carolina Stadium; Columbia, SC (rivalry)	W 27–0	47,000	
October 31	8:00 p.m.	at Rice*	No. 12	Rice Stadium; Houston, TX	W 19–0	27,000	
November 7	2:00 p.m.	Duke	No. 10	Memorial Stadium; Clemson, SC	W 6–0	40,000	
November 14	2:00 p.m.	Maryland^{†}	No. 11	Memorial Stadium; Clemson, SC	L 25–28	26,000	
November 21	2:00 p.m.	Wake Forest	No. 19	Memorial Stadium; Clemson, SC	W 33–31	34,000	
November 28	2:00 p.m.	at Furman*	No. 14	Sirrine Stadium; Greenville, SC	W 56–3	12,000	
December 19		vs. No. 7 TCU*	No. 11	Rice Stadium; Houston, TX (Bluebonnet Bowl)	W 23–7	55,000	
*Non-conference game; ^{†}Homecoming; Rankings from AP Poll released prior to the game; All times are in Eastern time
