= 1959 Drake Bulldogs football team =

American college football season

1959 Drake Bulldogs football
- Conference: Independent
- Record: 4–5
- Head coach: Tommy O'Connell (1st season)
- Home stadium: Drake Stadium

1959 Midwestern non-major college football independents records
	Conf.			Overall
Team	W	L	T	W		L		T
North Park		–		6	–	1	–	1
Northern Michigan		–		6	–	2	–	0
Carthage		–		5	–	3	–	1
Baldwin–Wallace		–		4	–	4	–	0
Xavier		–		4	–	6	–	0
Wabash		–		3	–	5	–	1
Rose Poly		–		2	–	4	–	1
Drake		–		2	–	7	–	0
Washington University		–		1	–	7	–	0
St. Norbert		–		0	–	6	–	1

The 1959 Drake Bulldogs football team was an American football team that represented Drake University as an independent during the 1959 college football season. In its first and only season under head coach Tommy O'Connell, the team compiled a 4–5 record and was outscored by a total of 247 to 106.

The team's statistical leaders included quarterback Ken Macke (553 passing yards), halfback Art Nichols (435 yards, 18 points scored), and halfback Phil Suetch (273 receiving yards).

In January 1960, O'Connell, at age 28, resigned as Drake's head coach to return to professional football, ultimately playing as a quarterback for the Buffalo Bills.

The team played its home games at Drake Stadium in Des Moines, Iowa.

== Schedule ==
Date	Opponent	Site	Result	Attendance	Source
September 18	Iowa State	Drake Stadium; Des Moines, IA	L 0–41	13,397	
September 25	Central Michigan	Drake Stadium; Des Moines, IA	L 21–24	4,500	
October 2	Iowa State Teachers	Drake Stadium; Des Moines, IA	L 6–14		
October 16	St. Ambrose	Drake Stadium; Des Moines, IA	L 22–23		
October 24	at Bradley	Peoria Stadium; Peoria, IL	W 20–12		
October 31	at West Texas State	Buffalo Bowl; Canyon, TX	L 21–34	11,000	
November 7	Washington University	Drake Stadium; Des Moines, IA	W 7–0	3,500	
November 14	at Wichita	Veterans Field; Wichita, KS	L 7–20	12,293	
November 21	at North Texas State	Fouts Field; Denton, TX	L 2–62		
