= 1960 Cotton Bowl Classic =

- 24th Cotton Bowl Classic
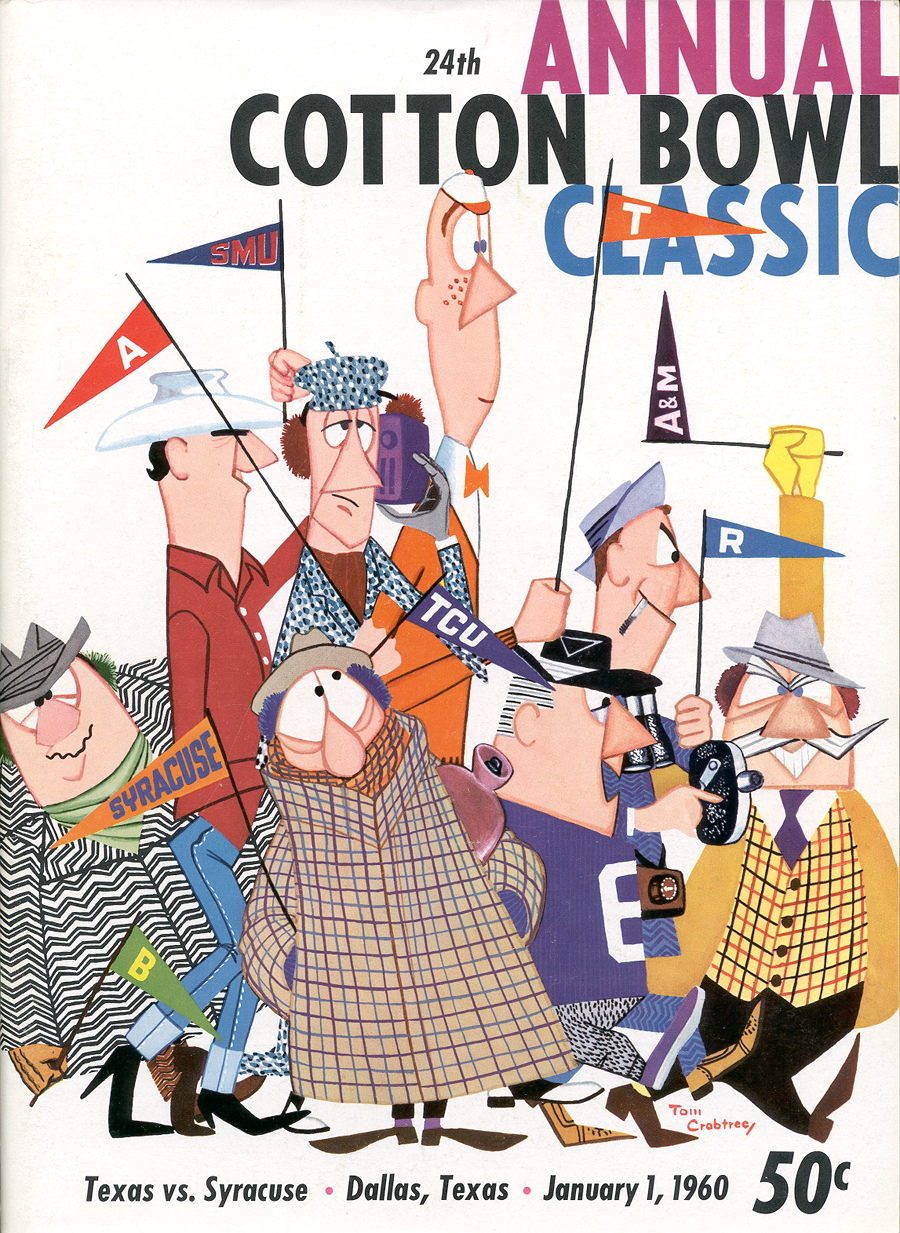
Syracuse Orangemen	Texas Longhorns
(10–0)	(9–1)
Independent	SWC
23	14
Head coach: Ben Schwartzwalder	Head coach: Darrell Royal
AP / Coaches; 1 / 1	AP / Coaches; 4 / 4
	1	2	3	4	Total
Syracuse	7	8	8	0	23
Texas	0	0	6	8	14
- Date: January 1, 1960
- Season: 1959
- Stadium: Cotton Bowl
- Location: Dallas, Texas
- MVP: Ernie Davis (Syracuse RB); Maurice Doke (Texas LB)
- Favorite: Syracuse by 12½ points
- Referee: Francis P. Brennan (ECAC; split crew: ECAC, SWC)
- Attendance: 75,504
- Payout: US$175,000 per team

United States TV coverage
- Network: CBS
- Announcers: Jack Drees, Forest Evashevski

The Cotton Bowl in Dallas, Texas, hosted the Cotton Bowl Classic.

The 1960 Cotton Bowl Classic was the 24th edition of the college football bowl game, played at the Cotton Bowl in Dallas, on Friday, January 1. Part of the 1959–60 bowl game season, it matched the independent and top-ranked Syracuse Orangemen and No. 4 Texas Longhorns of the Southwest Conference (SWC). The favored Orangemen won, 23–14.

== Teams ==
=== Syracuse ===
The Orangemen had just completed a perfect season for the first time in their history and were declared national champions by both major polls. They were looking for their first win in the Cotton Bowl, having lost previously three years earlier.

=== Texas ===
The Longhorns opened with eight wins and were co-champions of the Southwest Conference; after a late-season home loss to rival TCU, they dropped from second to fourth in the rankings. This was the first Cotton Bowl appearance for third-year head coach Darrell Royal and the first for the Longhorns in seven years.

== Game summary ==
The longest touchdown pass in Cotton Bowl history happened in this game as Syracuse halfback Gerhard Schwedes threw an 87-yard pass to Ernie Davis to give the Orangemen an early lead 1:13 into the game. Davis added in a touchdown run midway through the second quarter to extend the lead to 15–0 at halftime.

Jack Collins caught a 69-yard pass from Bobby Lackey to narrow the lead 1:46 into the third quarter, but the conversion failed, making it only 15–6. While Texas was trying to narrow the lead, Davis intercepted a Lackey pass at the Texas 24. Three plays later Schwedes ran in for a 3-yard touchdown run to make it 23–6 after another conversion success. Lackey narrowed it to 23–14 on a touchdown run in the fourth quarter, but only 7:21 was left on the clock by then. From that point on, the two teams did not seriously threaten to score again as the game ended in a Syracuse win.

=== Scoring ===
First quarter

- SYR – Ernie Davis 87-yard pass from Gerhard Schwedes (Bob Yates kick)

Second quarter

- SYR – Davis 1-yard run (Davis pass from Dave Sarette)

Third quarter

- TEX – Jack Collins 69-yard pass from Bobby Lackey (Rene Ramirez run failed)
- SYR – Schwedes 3-yard run (Davis pass from Sarette)

Fourth quarter

- TEX – Lackey 1-yard run (Richard Shulte pass from Lackey)

== Statistics ==
Statistics	Syracuse	Texas
First downs	12	10
Yards rushing	133	145
Yards passing	181	99
Total yards	314	244
Punts-Average	6–33.3	5–42.4
Fumbles-Lost	4–3	1–1
Interceptions	1	1
Penalties-Yards	6–67	7–61.5
