= 1959 North Carolina Tar Heels football team =

American college football season

1959 North Carolina Tar Heels football
- Conference: Atlantic Coast Conference
- Record: 5–5 (5–2 ACC)
- Head coach: Jim Hickey (1st season)
- Captains: Jack Cummings; Wade Smith
- Home stadium: Kenan Memorial Stadium

1959 Atlantic Coast Conference football standings
	Conf.					Overall
Team	W		L		T	W		L		T
No. 11 Clemson $	6	–	1	–	0	9	–	2	–	0
North Carolina	5	–	2	–	0	5	–	5	–	0
Maryland	4	–	2	–	0	5	–	5	–	0
South Carolina	4	–	3	–	0	6	–	4	–	0
Wake Forest	4	–	3	–	0	6	–	4	–	0
Duke	2	–	3	–	0	4	–	6	–	0
NC State	0	–	6	–	0	1	–	9	–	0
Virginia	0	–	5	–	0	0	–	10	–	0
$ – Conference champion; Rankings from AP poll

The 1959 North Carolina Tar Heels football team represented the University of North Carolina at Chapel Hill during the 1959 college football season. The Tar Heels were led by first-year head coach Jim Hickey and played their home games at Kenan Memorial Stadium. The team competed as a member of the Atlantic Coast Conference, finishing in second.

== Schedule ==
Date	Time	Opponent	Rank	Site	Result	Attendance	Source
September 19	2:00 p.m.	No. 18 Clemson	No. 12	Kenan Memorial Stadium; Chapel Hill, NC	L 18–20	43,000	
September 26	2:30 p.m.	at Notre Dame*		Notre Dame Stadium; Notre Dame, IN (rivalry)	L 8–28	56,746	
October 3	2:00 p.m.	NC State		Kenan Memorial Stadium; Chapel Hill, NC (rivalry)	W 20–12	38,000	
October 10	2:00 p.m.	No. 11 South Carolina		Kenan Memorial Stadium; Chapel Hill, NC (rivalry)	W 19–6	29,000	
October 17	1:30 p.m.	at Maryland		Byrd Stadium; College Park, MD	L 7–14	22,000	
October 24	2:00 p.m.	at Wake Forest		Bowman Gray Stadium; Winston-Salem, NC (rivalry)	W 21–19	19,000	
October 31	2:00 p.m.	No. 20 Tennessee*		Kenan Memorial Stadium; Chapel Hill, NC	L 7–29	30,000	
November 6	8:15 p.m.	at Miami (FL)*		Miami Orange Bowl; Miami, FL	L 7–14	31,136	
November 14	2:00 p.m.	Virginia		Kenan Memorial Stadium; Chapel Hill, NC (South's Oldest Rivalry)	W 41–0	21,000	
November 26	1:45 p.m.	at Duke		Duke Stadium; Durham, NC (Victory Bell)	W 50–0	33,000	
*Non-conference game; Rankings from AP Poll released prior to the game; All times are in Eastern time
