= 1959 Maryland Terrapins football team =

American college football season

1959 Maryland Terrapins football
- Conference: Atlantic Coast Conference
- Record: 5–5 (4–2 ACC)
- Head coach: Tom Nugent (1st season)
- Home stadium: Byrd Stadium

1959 Atlantic Coast Conference football standings
	Conf.					Overall
Team	W		L		T	W		L		T
No. 11 Clemson $	6	–	1	–	0	9	–	2	–	0
North Carolina	5	–	2	–	0	5	–	5	–	0
Maryland	4	–	2	–	0	5	–	5	–	0
South Carolina	4	–	3	–	0	6	–	4	–	0
Wake Forest	4	–	3	–	0	6	–	4	–	0
Duke	2	–	3	–	0	4	–	6	–	0
NC State	0	–	6	–	0	1	–	9	–	0
Virginia	0	–	5	–	0	0	–	10	–	0
$ – Conference champion; Rankings from AP poll

The 1959 Maryland Terrapins football team represented the University of Maryland in the 1959 college football season. In their first season under head coach Tom Nugent, the Terrapins compiled a 5–5 record (4–2 in conference), finished in third place in the Atlantic Coast Conference, and were outscored by their opponents 188 to 184. The team's statistical leaders included Dale Betty with 552 passing yards, Jim Joyce with 567 rushing yards, and Gary Collins with 350 receiving yards.

== Schedule ==
Date	Opponent	Site	Result	Attendance	Source
September 19	West Virginia*	Byrd Stadium; College Park, MD (rivalry)	W 27–7		
September 26	at No. 15 Texas*	Memorial Stadium; Austin, TX	L 0–26	42,000	
October 3	at No. 20 Syracuse*	Archbold Stadium; Syracuse, NY	L 0–29	30,000	
October 10	Wake Forest	Byrd Stadium; College Park, MD	L 7–10	21,000	
October 17	North Carolina	Byrd Stadium; College Park, MD	W 14–7	22,000	
October 31	at South Carolina	Carolina Stadium; Columbia, SC	L 6–22	20,000	
November 7	vs. Navy*	Memorial Stadium; Baltimore, MD (rivalry)	L 14–22	32,845	
November 14	at No. 11 Clemson	Memorial Stadium; Clemson, SC	W 28–25	26,000	
November 21	Virginia	Byrd Stadium; College Park, MD (rivalry)	W 55–12	16,000	
December 5	NC State	Byrd Stadium; College Park, MD	W 33–28	15,000	
*Non-conference game; Rankings from AP Poll released prior to the game
