= 1959 Cincinnati Bearcats football team =

American college football season

1959 Cincinnati Bearcats football
- Conference: Missouri Valley Conference
- Record: 5–4–1 (0–3–1 MVC)
- Head coach: George Blackburn (5th season)
- Captain: Jim Leo
- Home stadium: Nippert Stadium

1959 Missouri Valley Conference football standings
	Conf.					Overall
Team	W		L		T	W		L		T
North Texas State +	3	–	1	–	0	9	–	2	–	0
Houston +	3	–	1	–	0	3	–	7	–	0
Tulsa	2	–	2	–	0	5	–	5	–	0
Wichita	1	–	2	–	1	5	–	4	–	1
Cincinnati	0	–	3	–	1		5	–	4
+ – Conference co-champions

The 1959 Cincinnati Bearcats football team represented the University of Cincinnati in the Missouri Valley Conference (MVC) during the 1959 college football season. Led by fifth-year head coach George Blackburn, the Bearcats compiled an overall record of 5–4–1 with a mark of 0–3–1 in conference play, placing last out of five teams in the MVC. The team played home games at Nippert Stadium in Cincinnati.

== Schedule ==
Date	Opponent	Site	Result	Attendance	Source
September 19	at Oklahoma State*	Lewis Field; Stillwater, OK	W 22–9	20,000	
September 26	Dayton*	Nippert Stadium; Cincinnati, OH	W 21–7	23,000	
October 3	at Houston	Rice Stadium; Houston, TX	L 12–13	16,000	
October 10	North Texas State	Nippert Stadium; Cincinnati, OH	L 6–21	20,000–22,000	
October 17	at Wichita	Veterans Field; Wichita, KS	T 28–28	15,000	
October 24	Pacific (CA)*^{†}	Nippert Stadium; Cincinnati, OH	W 21–14	18,000	
October 31	Xavier*	Nippert Stadium; Cincinnati, OH (rivalry)	W 28–0	24,000	
November 7	at Tulsa	Skelly Stadium; Tulsa, OK	L 7–14	10,045	
November 14	Marquette*	Nippert Stadium; Cincinnati, OH	L 34–35	14,000	
November 26	No. 19 Miami (OH)*	Nippert Stadium; Cincinnati, OH (Victory Bell)	W 14–7	20,000	
*Non-conference game; ^{†}Homecoming; Rankings from UPI Poll released prior to the game
