= 1959 West Virginia Mountaineers football team =

American college football season

1959 West Virginia Mountaineers football
- Conference: Southern Conference
- Record: 3–7 (2–2 SoCon)
- Head coach: Art Lewis (10th season)
- Home stadium: Mountaineer Field

1959 Southern Conference football standings
	Conf.					Overall
Team	W		L		T	W		L		T
VMI $	5	–	0	–	1	8	–	1	–	1
The Citadel	5	–	1	–	0	8	–	2	–	0
Virginia Tech	3	–	1	–	0	6	–	4	–	0
Furman	3	–	2	–	0	3	–	7	–	0
Richmond	4	–	3	–	1	4	–	5	–	1
West Virginia	2	–	2	–	0	3	–	7	–	0
William & Mary	2	–	5	–	0	4	–	6	–	0
Davidson	0	–	5	–	0	1	–	8	–	0
George Washington	0	–	5	–	0	1	–	8	–	0
$ – Conference champion; Rankings from AP Poll

The 1959 West Virginia Mountaineers football team represented West Virginia University as a member of the Southern Conference (SoCon) during the 1959 college football season. Led by Art Lewis in his tenth and final season as head coach, the Mountaineers compiled an overall record of 3–7 with a mark of 2–2 in conference play, placing sixth in the SoCon.

== Schedule ==
Date	Opponent	Site	Result	Attendance	Source
September 19	at Maryland*	Byrd Stadium; College Park, MD (rivalry)	L 7–27		
September 26	Richmond	Mountaineer Field; Morgantown, WV	W 10–7	15,000	
October 2	at George Washington	Griffith Stadium; Washington, DC	W 10–8	6,000	
October 9	at Boston University*	Boston University Field; Boston, MA	L 0–7		
October 17	No. 20 Pittsburgh*	Mountaineer Field; Morgantown, WV (rivalry)	W 23–15		
October 24	at No. 6 Syracuse*	Archbold Stadium; Syracuse, NY (rivalry)	L 0–44	35,000	
October 31	No. 7 Penn State*	Mountaineer Field; Morgantown, WV (rivalry)	L 10–28		
November 7	at No. 6 USC*	Los Angeles Memorial Coliseum; Los Angeles, CA	L 0–36	34,066	
November 14	Virginia Tech	Mountaineer Field; Morgantown, WV (rivalry)	L 0–12	8,000	
November 21	The Citadel	Mountaineer Field; Morgantown, WV	L 14–20	7,000	
*Non-conference game; Rankings from AP Poll released prior to the game
