= 1959 South Carolina Gamecocks football team =

American college football season

1959 South Carolina Gamecocks football
- Conference: Atlantic Coast Conference
- Record: 6–4 (4–3 ACC)
- Head coach: Warren Giese (4th season)
- Captains: John Saunders; Ed Pitts
- Home stadium: Carolina Stadium

1959 Atlantic Coast Conference football standings
	Conf.					Overall
Team	W		L		T	W		L		T
No. 11 Clemson $	6	–	1	–	0	9	–	2	–	0
North Carolina	5	–	2	–	0	5	–	5	–	0
Maryland	4	–	2	–	0	5	–	5	–	0
South Carolina	4	–	3	–	0	6	–	4	–	0
Wake Forest	4	–	3	–	0	6	–	4	–	0
Duke	2	–	3	–	0	4	–	6	–	0
NC State	0	–	6	–	0	1	–	9	–	0
Virginia	0	–	5	–	0	0	–	10	–	0
$ – Conference champion; Rankings from AP poll

The 1959 South Carolina Gamecocks football team represented the University of South Carolina as a member of the Atlantic Coast Conference (ACC) during the 1959 college football season. Led by fourth-year head coach Warren Giese, the Gamecocks compiled an overall record of 6–4 with a mark of 4–3 in conference play, tying for fourth place in the ACC. The team played home games at Carolina Stadium in Columbia, South Carolina.

== Schedule ==
Date	Opponent	Rank	Site	Result	Attendance	Source
September 19	Duke	No. 14	Carolina Stadium; Columbia, SC	W 12–7	37,000	
September 26	Furman*	No. 20	Carolina Stadium; Columbia, SC	W 30–0	14,000	
October 3	No. 13 Georgia*	No. 16	Carolina Stadium; Columbia, SC (rivalry)	W 30–14	27,000	
October 10	at North Carolina	No. 11	Kenan Memorial Stadium; Chapel Hill, NC (rivalry)	L 6–19	29,000	
October 22	No. 17 Clemson		Carolina Stadium; Columbia, SC (rivalry)	L 0–27	47,000	
October 31	Maryland		Carolina Stadium; Columbia, SC	W 22–6	20,000	
November 7	at Virginia		Scott Stadium; Charlottesville, VA	W 32–20	10,000	
November 13	at Miami (FL)*		Miami Orange Bowl; Miami, FL	L 6–26	31,797	
November 21	NC State		Carolina Stadium; Columbia, SC	W 12–7	28,000	
November 28	vs. Wake Forest		American Legion Memorial Stadium; Charlotte, NC	L 20–43	12,600	
*Non-conference game; Rankings from AP Poll released prior to the game
