= 1959 Wake Forest Demon Deacons football team =

American college football season

1959 Wake Forest Demon Deacons football
- Conference: Atlantic Coast Conference
- Record: 6–4 (4–3 ACC)
- Head coach: Paul Amen (4th season)
- Captains: Neil MacLean; Buck Jolly
- Home stadium: Bowman Gray Stadium

1959 Atlantic Coast Conference football standings
	Conf.					Overall
Team	W		L		T	W		L		T
No. 11 Clemson $	6	–	1	–	0	9	–	2	–	0
North Carolina	5	–	2	–	0	5	–	5	–	0
Maryland	4	–	2	–	0	5	–	5	–	0
South Carolina	4	–	3	–	0	6	–	4	–	0
Wake Forest	4	–	3	–	0	6	–	4	–	0
Duke	2	–	3	–	0	4	–	6	–	0
NC State	0	–	6	–	0	1	–	9	–	0
Virginia	0	–	5	–	0	0	–	10	–	0
$ – Conference champion; Rankings from AP poll

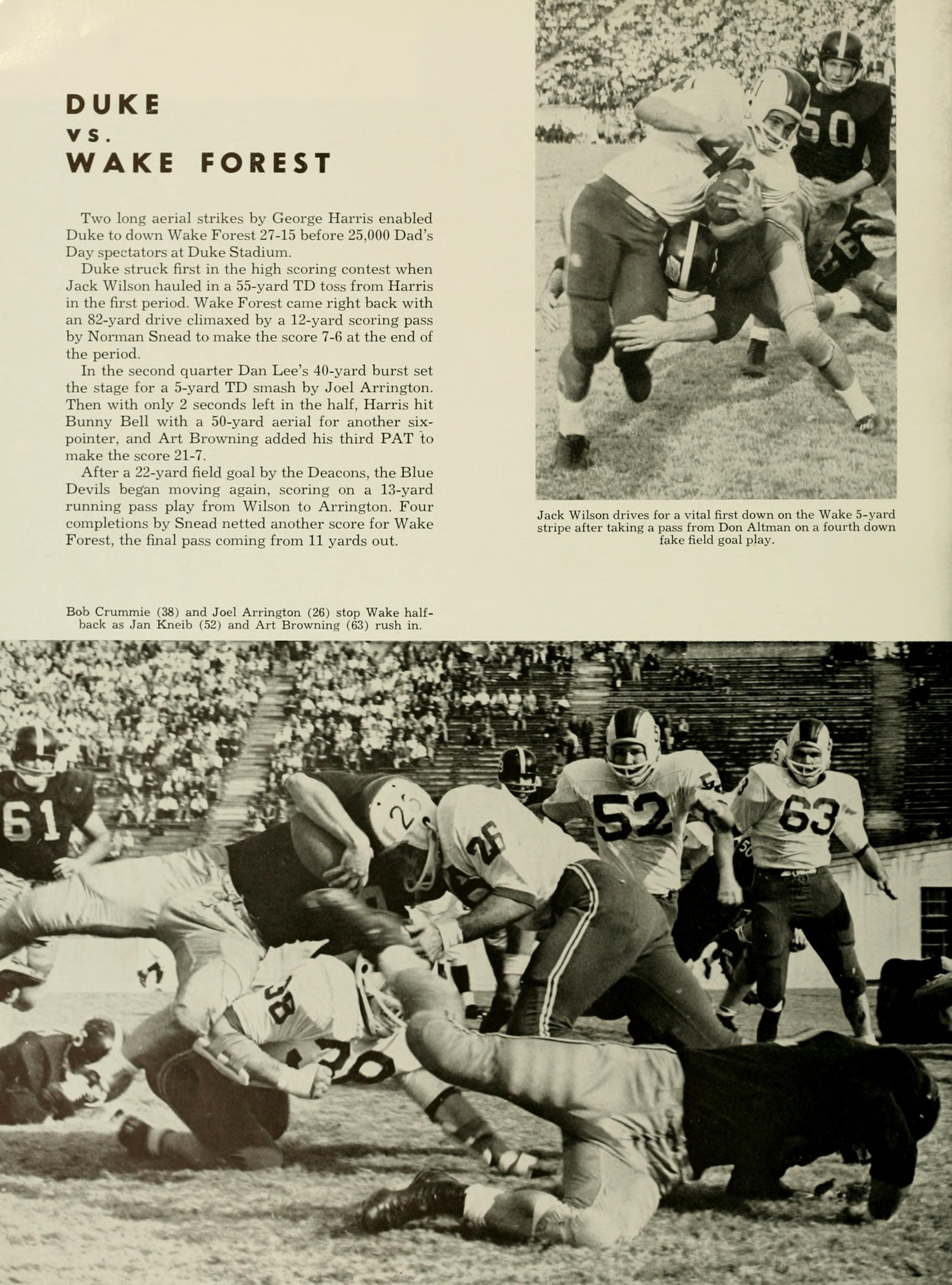
Wake Forest vs. Duke game

The 1959 Wake Forest Demon Deacons football team was an American football team that represented Wake Forest University during the 1959 college football season. In their fourth season under head coach Paul Amen, the Demon Deacons compiled a 6–4 record and finished in a tie for fourth place in the Atlantic Coast Conference.

Quarterback Norm Snead and end Pete Manning were selected by the Associated Press and United Press International as first-team players on the 1959 All-Atlantic Coast Conference football team. Snead later played 16 seasons in the NFL and was a four-time All-Pro selection. Guard Nick Patella was selected to the All-ACC team by the UPI.

== Schedule ==
Date	Time	Opponent	Site	Result	Attendance	Source
September 19		at Florida State*	Doak Campbell Stadium; Tallahassee, FL	W 22–20	19,300	
September 27		Virginia Tech*	Bowman Gray Stadium; Winston-Salem, NC	W 27–18	9,000	
October 3		at Tulane*	Tulane Stadium; New Orleans, LA	L 0–6	18,000	
October 10		at Maryland	Bryd Stadium; College Park, MD	W 10–7	21,000	
October 17		at NC State	Riddick Stadium; Raleigh, NC (rivalry)	W 17–14	16,000	
October 24		North Carolina	Bowman Gray Stadium; Winston-Salem, NC (rivalry)	L 19–21	19,000	
October 31		Virginia	Bowman Gray Stadium; Winston-Salem, NC	W 34–12	7,500	
November 14		at Duke	Duke Stadium; Durham, NC (rivalry)	L 15–27	25,000	
November 21		at No. 19 Clemson	Memorial Stadium; Clemson, SC	L 31–33	34,000	
November 28	2:00 p.m.	vs. South Carolina	American Legion Memorial Stadium; Charlotte, NC	W 43–20	12,600	
*Non-conference game; Rankings from AP Poll released prior to the game

== Team leaders ==
Category	Team Leader	Att/Cth	Yds
Passing	Norm Snead	82/191	1,361
Rushing	Neil MacLean	105	373
Receiving	Bobby Allen	25	462
