= 1959 VMI Keydets football team =

American college football season

1959 VMI Keydets football

SoCon champion
- Conference: Southern Conference
- Record: 8–1–1 (5–0–1 SoCon)
- Head coach: John McKenna (7th season)
- Home stadium: Wilson Field

1959 Southern Conference football standings
	Conf.					Overall
Team	W		L		T	W		L		T
VMI $	5	–	0	–	1	8	–	1	–	1
The Citadel	5	–	1	–	0	8	–	2	–	0
Virginia Tech	3	–	1	–	0	6	–	4	–	0
Furman	3	–	2	–	0	3	–	7	–	0
Richmond	4	–	3	–	1	4	–	5	–	1
West Virginia	2	–	2	–	0	3	–	7	–	0
William & Mary	2	–	5	–	0	4	–	6	–	0
Davidson	0	–	5	–	0	1	–	8	–	0
George Washington	0	–	5	–	0	1	–	8	–	0
$ – Conference champion; Rankings from AP Poll

The 1959 VMI Keydets football team was an American football team that represented the Virginia Military Institute (VMI) as a member of the Southern Conference (SoCon) during the 1959 college football season. Led by seventh-year head coach John McKenna, the Keydets compiled an overall record of 8–1–1 with a mark of 5–0–1 in conference play, winning the SoCon title.

== Schedule ==
Date	Opponent	Site	Result	Attendance	Source
September 19	at Marshall*	Fairfield Stadium; Huntington, WV	W 46–0	7,500	
September 26	at No. 18 Penn State*	New Beaver Field; University Park, PA	L 0–21	19,800	
October 3	vs. Richmond	Portsmouth Stadium; Portsmouth, VA	T 14–14	6,000	
October 10	vs. Virginia*	City Stadium; Lynchburg, VA	W 19–12	7,000	
October 17	at William & Mary	Foreman Field; Norfolk, VA (rivalry)	W 26–7	5,000	
October 24	Davidson	Wilson Field; Lexington, VA	W 34–7		
October 30	at George Washington	Griffith Stadium; Washington, DC	W 28–6	5,000	
November 7	at Lehigh*	Taylor Stadium; Bethlehem, PA	W 7–6	4,500	
November 14	The Citadel	Wilson Field; Lexington, VA (rivalry)	W 32–8	8,000	
November 26	vs. Virginia Tech	Victory Stadium; Roanoke, VA (rivalry)	W 37–12	27,500	
*Non-conference game; Rankings from Coaches' Poll released prior to the game
