= 1959 Arkansas Razorbacks football team =

American college football season

1959 Arkansas Razorbacks football

Southwest Conference co-champion Gator Bowl champion

Gator Bowl, W 14–7 vs. Georgia Tech
- Conference: Southwest Conference

Ranking
- Coaches: No. 9
- AP: No. 9
- Record: 9–2 (5–1 SWC)
- Head coach: Frank Broyles (2nd season)
- Captains: Billy Luplow; James Monroe; Barry Switzer
- Home stadium: Razorback Stadium; War Memorial Stadium

1959 Southwest Conference football standings
	Conf.					Overall
Team	W		L		T	W		L		T
No. 9 Arkansas +	5	–	1	–	0	9	–	2	–	0
No. 4 Texas +	5	–	1	–	0	9	–	2	–	0
No. 7 TCU +	5	–	1	–	0	8	–	3	–	0
SMU	2	–	3	–	1	5	–	4	–	1
Baylor	2	–	4	–	0	4	–	6	–	0
Rice	1	–	4	–	1	1	–	7	–	2
Texas A&M	0	–	6	–	0	3	–	7	–	0
+ – Conference co-champions; Rankings from AP Poll

The 1959 Arkansas Razorbacks football team represented the University of Arkansas in the Southwest Conference (SWC) during the 1959 college football season. In their second year under head coach Frank Broyles, the Razorbacks compiled a 9–2 record (5–1 against SWC opponents), finished in a tie with Texas for the SWC championship, and outscored all opponents by a combined total of 163 to 101. The Razorbacks' only losses came against Texas by a 13–12 score and to Mississippi by a 28–0 score. The team was ranked #9 in both the final AP Poll and the final UPI Coaches Poll and went on to defeat Georgia Tech in the 1960 Gator Bowl by a 14–7 score. Halfback Jim Mooty was selected by the Associated Press as a first-team player on the 1959 All-America Team.

== Schedule ==
Date	Opponent	Rank	Site	Result	Attendance	Source
September 19	Tulsa*		Razorback Stadium; Fayetteville, AR	W 28–0	23,000	
September 26	Oklahoma State*		War Memorial Stadium; Little Rock, AR	W 13–7	30,000	
October 3	TCU		Razorback Stadium; Fayetteville, AR	W 3–0	20,000	
October 10	at Baylor	No. 19	Baylor Stadium; Waco, TX	W 23–7	24,000	
October 17	No. 3 Texas	No. 12	War Memorial Stadium; Little Rock, AR (rivalry)	L 12–13	40,000	
October 24	vs. No. 6 Ole Miss*	No. 10	Crump Stadium; Memphis, TN (rivalry)	L 0–28	32,004	
October 31	Texas A&M	No. 17	Razorback Stadium; Fayetteville, AR (rivalry)	W 12–7	30,000	
November 7	at Rice	No. 16	Rice Stadium; Houston, TX	W 14–10	39,000	
November 14	at SMU	No. 20	Cotton Bowl; Dallas, TX	W 17–14	31,000	
November 21	Texas Tech*	No. 13	War Memorial Stadium; Little Rock, AR (rivalry)	W 27–8	35,000	
January 2	vs. Georgia Tech*	No. 9	Gator Bowl; Jacksonville, FL (Gator Bowl)	W 14–7	45,104	
*Non-conference game; Rankings from AP Poll released prior to the game
