= 1959 The Citadel Bulldogs football team =

American college football season

1959 The Citadel Bulldogs football
- Conference: Southern Conference
- Record: 8–2 (5–1 SoCon)
- Head coach: Eddie Teague (3rd season)
- Home stadium: Johnson Hagood Stadium

1959 Southern Conference football standings
	Conf.					Overall
Team	W		L		T	W		L		T
VMI $	5	–	0	–	1	8	–	1	–	1
The Citadel	5	–	1	–	0	8	–	2	–	0
Virginia Tech	3	–	1	–	0	6	–	4	–	0
Furman	3	–	2	–	0	3	–	7	–	0
Richmond	4	–	3	–	1	4	–	5	–	1
West Virginia	2	–	2	–	0	3	–	7	–	0
William & Mary	2	–	5	–	0	4	–	6	–	0
Davidson	0	–	5	–	0	1	–	8	–	0
George Washington	0	–	5	–	0	1	–	8	–	0
$ – Conference champion; Rankings from AP Poll

The 1959 The Citadel Bulldogs football team represented The Citadel, The Military College of South Carolina in the 1959 college football season. Eddie Teague served as head coach for the third season. The Bulldogs played as members of the Southern Conference and played home games at Johnson Hagood Stadium.

== Schedule ==
Date	Opponent	Site	Result	Attendance	Source
September 19	Newberry*	Johnson Hagood Stadium; Charleston, SC	W 48–0	16,000	
September 26	at Florida State*	Doak Campbell Stadium; Tallahassee, FL	L 6–47		
October 3	Davidson	Johnson Hagood Stadium; Charleston, SC	W 13–7		
October 9	vs. Wofford*	County Fairgrounds; Orangeburg, SC (rivalry)	W 40–8	8,000	
October 17	Richmond	Johnson Hagood Stadium; Charleston, SC	W 8–7		
October 24	Furman^{†}	Johnson Hagood Stadium; Charleston, SC (rivalry)	W 18–14	15,100	
October 31	at William & Mary	Cary Field; Williamsburg, VA	W 38–13	4,500	
November 7	Presbyterian*	Johnson Hagood Stadium; Charleston, SC	W 8–0		
November 14	at VMI	Wilson Field; Lexington, VA (rivalry)	L 8–32	8,000	
November 21	at West Virginia	Mountaineer Field; Morgantown, WV	W 20–14	7,000	
*Non-conference game; ^{†}Homecoming

== NFL Draft selection ==
Year	Round	Pick	Overall	Name	Team	Position
1959	14	9	165	Pete Davidson	Los Angeles Rams	Tackle-Guard
