= 1959 Tulsa Golden Hurricane football team =

American college football season

1959 Tulsa Golden Hurricane football
- Conference: Missouri Valley Conference
- Record: 5–5 (2–2 MVC)
- Head coach: Bobby Dobbs (5th season)
- Home stadium: Skelly Field

1959 Missouri Valley Conference football standings
	Conf.					Overall
Team	W		L		T	W		L		T
North Texas State +	3	–	1	–	0	9	–	2	–	0
Houston +	3	–	1	–	0	3	–	7	–	0
Tulsa	2	–	2	–	0	5	–	5	–	0
Wichita	1	–	2	–	1	5	–	4	–	1
Cincinnati	0	–	3	–	1		5	–	4
+ – Conference co-champions

The 1959 Tulsa Golden Hurricane football team represented the University of Tulsa during the 1959 college football season. In their fifth year under head coach Bobby Dodds, the Golden Hurricane compiled a 5–5 record (2–2 against Missouri Valley Conference opponents), and finished in third place in the conference. The team's statistical leaders included Jerry Keeling with 752 passing yards, Bob Brumble with 599 rushing yards, and Buddy Kelly with 270 receiving yards.

== Schedule ==
Date	Opponent	Site	Result	Attendance	Source
September 19	at Arkansas*	Razorback Stadium; Fayetteville, AR	L 0–28	23,000	
September 26	New Mexico State*	Skelly Stadium; Tulsa, OK	W 28–27	12,000–14,500	
October 3	at Texas Tech*	Jones Stadium; Lubbock, TX	L 7–8	12,000	
October 10	at Oklahoma State*	Lewis Field; Stillwater, OK (rivalry)	L 0–26	21,000	
October 17	Hardin–Simmons*	Skelly Stadium; Tulsa, OK	W 16–8	12,317	
October 24	Detroit*	Skelly Stadium; Tulsa, OK	W 21–6	12,120	
October 31	Houston^{†}	Skelly Stadium; Tulsa, OK	L 13–22	12,034	
November 7	Cincinnati	Skelly Stadium; Tulsa, OK	W 14–7	10,045	
November 14	No. 16 North Texas State	Skelly Stadium; Tulsa, OK	W 17–6	6,480–6,872	
November 26	at Wichita	Veterans Field; Wichita, KS	L 21–26	6,000	
*Non-conference game; ^{†}Homecoming; Rankings from AP Poll released prior to the game
