= 1959 North Texas State Eagles football team =

American college football season

1959 North Texas State Eagles football

MVC co-champion

Sun Bowl, L 8–28 vs. New Mexico State
- Conference: Missouri Valley Conference
- Record: 9–2 (3–1 MVC)
- Head coach: Odus Mitchell (14th season)
- Home stadium: Fouts Field

1959 Missouri Valley Conference football standings
	Conf.					Overall
Team	W		L		T	W		L		T
North Texas State +	3	–	1	–	0	9	–	2	–	0
Houston +	3	–	1	–	0	3	–	7	–	0
Tulsa	2	–	2	–	0	5	–	5	–	0
Wichita	1	–	2	–	1	5	–	4	–	1
Cincinnati	0	–	3	–	1		5	–	4
+ – Conference co-champions

The 1959 North Texas State Eagles football team represented the University of North Texas as a member of the Missouri Valley Conference (MVC) during the 1959 college football season. The Eagles, coached by Odus Mitchell, compiled a 9–2 record, and outscored their opponents 303 to 103. The Eagles were ranked for two weeks in the AP Poll. They shared the MVC title with Houston and finished the season with a 28–8 loss to New Mexico State in the 1959 Sun Bowl.

This was the last time that North Texas was ranked in the AP Poll until 2025.

== Schedule ==
Date	Opponent	Rank	Site	Result	Attendance	Source
September 17	at Hardin–Simmons*		Public Schools Stadium; Abilene, TX	W 46–24	11,000	
September 26	at Texas Western*		Kidd Field; El Paso, TX	W 31–7	8,000–8,500	
October 3	West Texas State		Fouts Field; Denton, TX	W 28–6		
October 10	at Cincinnati*		Nippert Stadium; Cincinnati, OH	W 21–6	20,000–22,000	
October 17	Pensacola NAS*		Fouts Field; Denton, TX	W 43–0	7,000	
October 24	at Houston		Rice Stadium; Houston, TX	W 7–6	12,000	
October 31	Wichita^{†}		Fouts Field; Denton, TX	W 12–0		
November 7	Louisville*	No. 20	Fouts Field; Denton, TX	W 39–7	5,000	
November 14	at Tulsa	No. 16	Skelly Field; Tulsa, OK	L 6–17	6,480–6,872	
November 21	Drake*		Fouts Field; Denton, TX	W 62–2		
December 31	vs. New Mexico State*		Kidd Field; El Paso, TX (Sun Bowl)	L 8–28	14,000	
*Non-conference game; ^{†}Homecoming; Rankings from AP Poll released prior to the game
