= 1959 SMU Mustangs football team =

American college football season

1959 SMU Mustangs football
- Conference: Southwest Conference
- Record: 5–4–1 (2–3–1 SWC)
- Head coach: Bill Meek (3rd season)
- Captain: Don Meredith
- Home stadium: Cotton Bowl

1959 Southwest Conference football standings
	Conf.					Overall
Team	W		L		T	W		L		T
No. 9 Arkansas +	5	–	1	–	0	9	–	2	–	0
No. 4 Texas +	5	–	1	–	0	9	–	2	–	0
No. 7 TCU +	5	–	1	–	0	8	–	3	–	0
SMU	2	–	3	–	1	5	–	4	–	1
Baylor	2	–	4	–	0	4	–	6	–	0
Rice	1	–	4	–	1	1	–	7	–	2
Texas A&M	0	–	6	–	0	3	–	7	–	0
+ – Conference co-champions; Rankings from AP Poll

The 1959 SMU Mustangs football team represented Southern Methodist University (SMU) as a member of the Southwest Conference (SWC) during the 1959 college football season. Led by third-year head coach Bill Meek, the Mustangs compiled an overall record of 5–4–1 with a conference mark of 2–3–1, placing fifth in the SWC. SMU's offense scored 147 points while the defense allowed 133 points.

== Schedule ==
Date	Opponent	Rank	Site	Result	Attendance	Source
September 26	at No. 16 Georgia Tech*	No. 6	Grant Field; Atlanta, GA	L 12–16	43,000	
October 3	No. 15 Navy*		Cotton Bowl; Dallas, TX (rivalry)	W 20–7	46,000	
October 9	Missouri*	No. 15	Cotton Bowl; Dallas, TX	W 23–2	33,000	
October 17	at Rice	No. T–15	Rice Stadium; Houston, TX (rivalry)	T 13–13	65,000	
October 24	Texas Tech*		Cotton Bowl; Dallas, TX	W 21–13	30,000	
October 31	No. 4 Texas		Cotton Bowl; Dallas, TX	L 0–21	65,000	
November 7	at Texas A&M		Kyle Field; College Station, TX	W 14–11	19,000	
November 14	No. 20 Arkansas		Cotton Bowl; Dallas, TX	L 14–17	31,000	
November 21	at Baylor		Baylor Stadium; Waco, TX	W 30–14	25,000	
November 28	at No. 8 TCU		Amon G. Carter Stadium; Fort Worth, TX (rivalry)	L 0–19	40,000	
*Non-conference game; Rankings from AP Poll released prior to the game

== Roster ==
1959 SMU Mustangs football team roster
Players			Coaches
Offense: Pos. / # / Name / Class; QB / 17 / Don Meredith / Sr	Defense: Pos. / # / Name / Class	Special teams: Pos. / # / Name / Class	Head coach: Bill Meek; Coordinators/assistant coaches Legend: (C) Team captain; (S) Suspended; (I) Ineligible; Injured; Redshirt

== Team players drafted into the NFL ==
Player	Position	Round	Pick	NFL club
Don Meredith	Quarterback	3	32	Chicago Bears
Jim Welch	Defensive back	3	34	Baltimore Colts
James Jones	End	13	145	Los Angeles Rams
