= Clemson–Georgia Tech football rivalry =

American college football rivalry

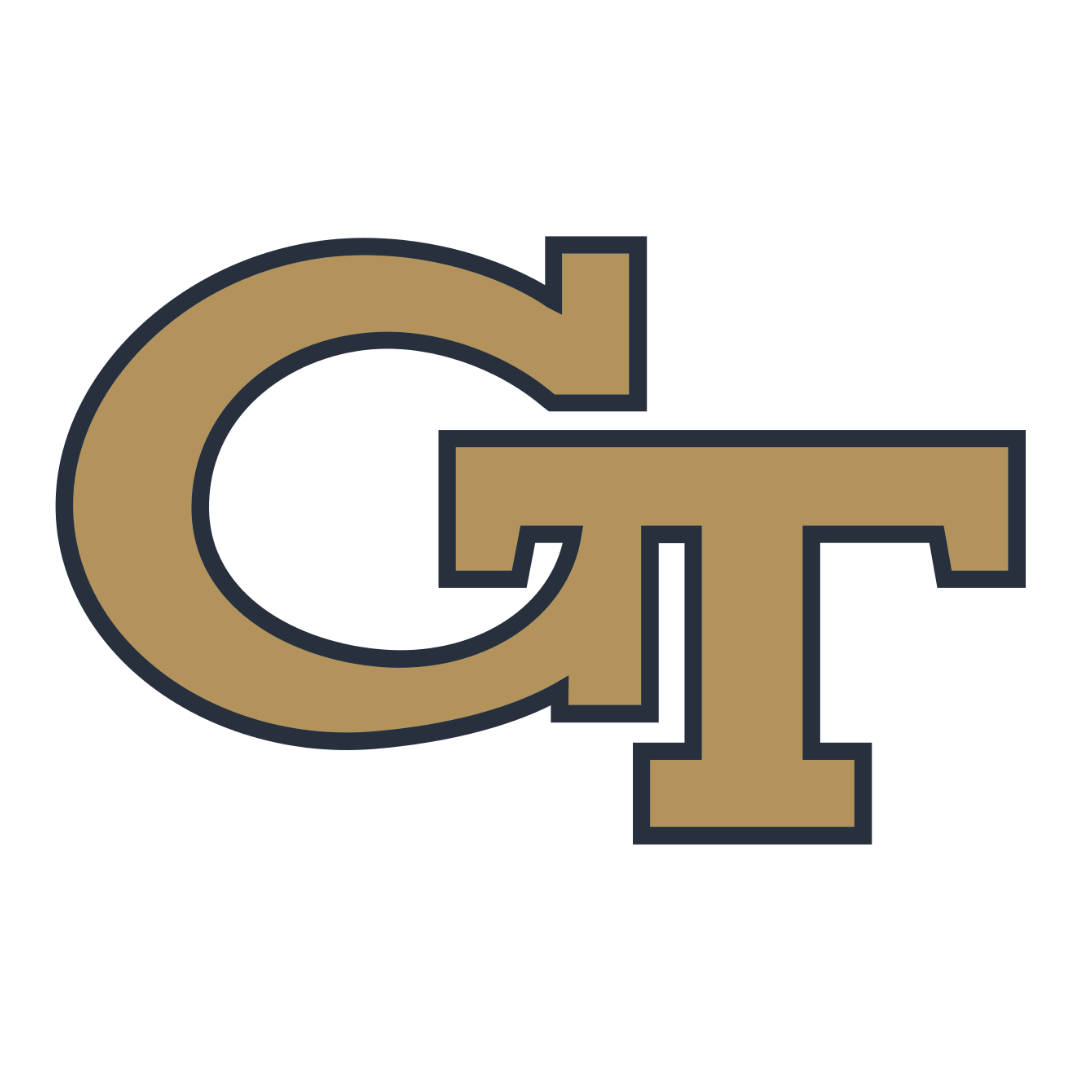
- Clemson Tigers Georgia Tech Yellow Jackets
- First meeting: November 24, 1898; Clemson, 23–0
- Latest meeting: November 14, 2026; Georgia Tech, 20–6
- Next meeting: TBD

Statistics
- Total meetings: 91
- All-time series: Georgia Tech leads, 52–36–2
- Largest victory: Clemson, 73–0 (1903)
- Longest win streak: Georgia Tech, 15 (1908–1934)
- Current win streak: Georgia Tech, 2 (2025–present)

Locations of Clemson and Georgia Tech

The Clemson–Georgia Tech football rivalry is an American college football rivalry between the Clemson Tigers football team of Clemson University and Georgia Tech Yellow Jackets football team of Georgia Tech. Both schools are members of the Atlantic Coast Conference. Since conference expansion in 2005, Clemson represents the Atlantic Division while Georgia Tech plays in the Coastal Division, and they are cross-divisional rivals which play every year. However, with the abolishment of divisions in 2023, and the ACC's scheduling formula, the two sides will see each other less.

Clemson won the first four games of the rivalry, but Georgia Tech leads the all-time series 51–36–2. There have been two lengthy win streaks, as the Yellow Jackets went 15–0 against Clemson from 1908 to 1934 and 10–0 against Clemson from 1953 to 1968. Football legend John Heisman coached both teams and went undefeated in the rivalry. Heisman coached (and won) two games for Clemson against Georgia Tech before switching sides and going 12–0–1 for Georgia Tech against Clemson. From 1902 to 1973, all games were played in Atlanta near the campus of Georgia Tech. The home-and-home ACC series has been hotly contested at 23–17 (in favor of Clemson) since it began in 1983. The rivalry was played twice in a single year when Georgia Tech defeated Clemson in September 2009 and repeated the feat when they faced off again in the 2009 ACC Championship Game three months later.

The rivals have seen large and similar amounts of high-level success, as Georgia Tech claims four national championships (1917, 1928, 1954, 1990) and Clemson three (1981, 2016, 2018). Moreover, Georgia Tech (25–19) and Clemson (24–20) have each played in 44 bowl games, while Clemson and Georgia Tech have 744 and 735 all-time wins, respectively, as of the conclusion of the 2018 season.

These two ACC members also have intense rivalries with their sibling flagship university state schools from the SEC: Georgia Tech's Clean, Old-Fashioned Hate rivalry with the Georgia Bulldogs, and Clemson's Palmetto Bowl game against the South Carolina Gamecocks.

== Series history ==
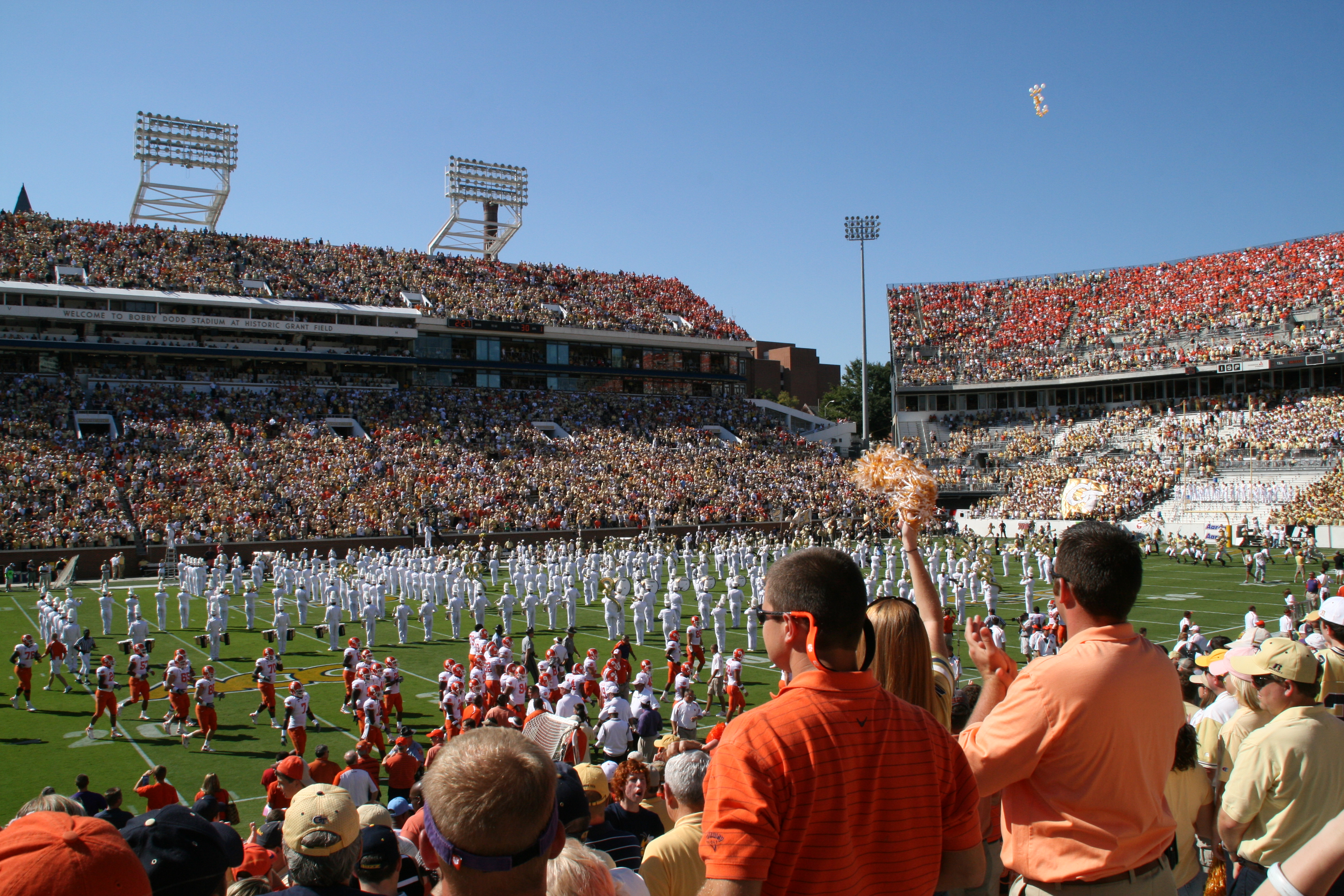
The teams take the field at the 2007 Clemson–Georgia Tech game at Bobby Dodd Stadium

Through 2025, the teams have played 90 times, with Tech leading the series 51–36–2, with 61 games played in Atlanta, and only 20 games played in Clemson's Memorial Stadium. The teams first met in 1898, when Clemson's third-year program defeated Georgia Tech 23–0 to finish with a 3–1 record. The following year, the Tigers beat Tech again, 41–5. In 1904, Georgia Tech lured away Clemson's head coach, John Heisman (namesake of the Heisman Trophy), with the prospect of $450 pay raise ($16,125 adjusted for inflation), which was a 25% salary increase.

In 1977, Georgia Tech, a year before it joined the ACC, decided to end its series with Clemson. George Bennett, a Clemson athletics booster, was determined to preserve the game, as the trip to Atlanta provided a unique experience for the Tigers players and fanbase who had not been to a bowl game since 1959. In what was supposed to be the final game in Atlanta, upon Bennett's suggestion, thousands of Clemson supporters paid their expenses with two-dollar bills stamped with the shape of a tiger paw. This demonstrated the large amount of money that the Clemson fanbase regularly pumped into the local economy because of the game.

The series resumed in 1983 when Georgia Tech began playing football in the ACC. This has become one of the most competitive rivalries in the ACC with a record of 17–16, with Clemson currently leading the series by one game (excluding the vacated 2009 ACC Championship Game won by Tech). These games have often been decided at the last minute and by small margins. Nine of the games between 1996 and 2006 were decided by five points or less.

When the Atlantic Coast Conference- ACC- reorganized in 2005 to form divisions for the sport of football, Clemson and Georgia Tech were designated as cross-division rivals. This means that their football teams meet every season, unlike games between each team's other non-divisional conference opponents, which are played less often on a rotational basis.

In the 2009 season, both teams won their respective division in the ACC. For the first time in the series' history, the two teams met for a second time in a season on December 5, 2009, in the ACC Championship Game. The game marked the first ever December meeting between the two teams, as well as the first post-season meeting. It was also the first time the series has been played outside of Atlanta or Clemson since 1899. Georgia Tech won 39–34; however, the NCAA later vacated the last 3 games of Georgia Tech's 2009 season along with the ACC Championship. The NCAA determined that starting WR Demaryius Thomas should have been ruled ineligible ahead of the previous game for accepting $312 worth of clothing from a potential agent. While the offense was minor, and the individual never proven to be an agent and the clothing returned, the NCAA ruled that Georgia Tech's athletic department had prepared the players prior to submitting statements, and was generally uncooperative with the NCAA investigation. Therefore, all games following the alleged offense have been vacated, including the 2009 ACC championship game with Clemson.

In the 2011 season, both teams started 6–0. Clemson had beaten previous national champion Auburn earlier in the season, and the match-up was highly anticipated until Georgia Tech stumbled losing two straight games, at Virginia and at Miami (FL). Clemson's Andre Ellington was injured, and after 4 Clemson turnovers, Georgia Tech went on to upset the #5 Tigers 31–17. Both teams went on to lose three games toward the end of the season, with the exception of Clemson's dominating performance over Coastal Division champion #5 Virginia Tech to clinch the 2011 ACC Championship.

== Game results ==
Clemson victories	Georgia Tech victories	Tie games	Vacated win

No.	Date	Location	Winner	Score
1	November 24, 1898	Augusta, GA	Clemson	23–0
2	November 30, 1899	Greenville, SC	Clemson	41–5
3	October 18, 1902	Atlanta, GA	Clemson	44–5
4	October 17, 1903	Atlanta, GA	Clemson	73–0
5	November 5, 1904	Atlanta, GA	Tie	11–11
6	November 30, 1905	Atlanta, GA	Georgia Tech	17–10
7	November 29, 1906	Atlanta, GA	Clemson	10–0
8	November 28, 1907	Atlanta, GA	Clemson	6–5
9	November 26, 1908	Atlanta, GA	Georgia Tech	30–6
10	November 25, 1909	Atlanta, GA	Georgia Tech	29–3
11	November 24, 1910	Atlanta, GA	Georgia Tech	34–0
12	November 30, 1911	Atlanta, GA	Georgia Tech	32–0
13	November 28, 1912	Atlanta, GA	Georgia Tech	20–0
14	November 27, 1913	Atlanta, GA	Georgia Tech	34–0
15	November 26, 1914	Atlanta, GA	Georgia Tech	26–6
16	October 5, 1918	Atlanta, GA	Georgia Tech	28–0
17	October 9, 1919	Atlanta, GA	Georgia Tech	28–0
18	November 6, 1920	Atlanta, GA	Georgia Tech	7–0
19	November 5, 1921	Atlanta, GA	Georgia Tech	48–7
20	November 4, 1922	Atlanta, GA	Georgia Tech	21–7
21	October 1, 1932	Atlanta, GA	Georgia Tech	32–14
22	September 30, 1933	Atlanta, GA	Georgia Tech	39–2
23	September 29, 1934	Atlanta, GA	Georgia Tech	12–7
24	October 31, 1936	Atlanta, GA	Clemson	14–13
25	November 6, 1937	Atlanta, GA	Georgia Tech	7–0
26	November 20, 1943	Atlanta, GA	#15 Georgia Tech	41–6
27	September 30, 1944	Atlanta, GA	Georgia Tech	51–0
28	November 24, 1945	Atlanta, GA	Clemson	21–7
29	November 7, 1953	Atlanta, GA	#6 Georgia Tech	20–7
30	November 8, 1958	Atlanta, GA	Georgia Tech	13–0
31	October 3, 1959	Atlanta, GA	#7 Georgia Tech	16–6
32	September 22, 1962	Atlanta, GA	Georgia Tech	26–9
33	September 28, 1963	Atlanta, GA	#9 Georgia Tech	27–0
34	October 3, 1964	Atlanta, GA	Georgia Tech	14–7
35	October 2, 1965	Atlanta, GA	Georgia Tech	38–6
36	October 1, 1966	Atlanta, GA	#9 Georgia Tech	13–12
37	October 7, 1967	Atlanta, GA	Georgia Tech	10–0
38	October 5, 1968	Atlanta, GA	Georgia Tech	24–21
39	October 4, 1969	Atlanta, GA	Clemson	21–10
40	October 3, 1970	Atlanta, GA	#15 Georgia Tech	28–7
41	October 2, 1971	Atlanta, GA	Georgia Tech	24–14
42	October 7, 1972	Atlanta, GA	Georgia Tech	31–9
43	September 29, 1973	Atlanta, GA	Georgia Tech	29–21
44	September 28, 1974	Clemson, SC	Clemson	21–17
45	September 27, 1975	Atlanta, GA	Georgia Tech	33–28
46	September 25, 1976	Atlanta, GA	Tie	24–24
47	September 24, 1977	Atlanta, GA	Clemson	31–14

No.	Date	Location	Winner	Score
48	September 24, 1983	Clemson, SC	Clemson	41–14
49	September 29, 1984	Atlanta, GA	#18 Georgia Tech	28–21
50	September 28, 1985	Clemson, SC	Georgia Tech	14–3
51	September 27, 1986	Atlanta, GA	Clemson	27–3
52	September 26, 1987	Clemson, SC	#9 Clemson	33–12
53	September 24, 1988	Atlanta, GA	#12 Clemson	30–13
54	October 14, 1989	Clemson, SC	Georgia Tech	30–14
55	October 13, 1990	Atlanta, GA	#18 Georgia Tech	21–19
56	September 28, 1991	Clemson, SC	#7 Clemson	9–7
57	September 26, 1992	Atlanta, GA	Georgia Tech	20–16
58	September 25, 1993	Clemson, SC	Clemson	16–13
59	November 12, 1994	Clemson, SC	Clemson	20–10
60	October 28, 1995	Atlanta, GA	Clemson	24–3
61	October 19, 1996	Clemson, SC	Clemson	28–25
62	September 27, 1997	Atlanta, GA	Georgia Tech	23–20
63	November 12, 1998	Clemson, SC	#22 Georgia Tech	24–21
64	November 13, 1999	Atlanta, GA	#13 Georgia Tech	45–42
65	October 28, 2000	Clemson, SC	Georgia Tech	31–28
66	September 29, 2001	Atlanta, GA	Clemson	47–44
67	September 14, 2002	Clemson, SC	Clemson	24–19
68	September 20, 2003	Atlanta, GA	Clemson	39–3
69	September 11, 2004	Clemson, SC	Georgia Tech	28–24
70	October 29, 2005	Atlanta, GA	Georgia Tech	10–9
71	October 21, 2006	Clemson, SC	#12 Clemson	31–7
72	September 29, 2007	Atlanta, GA	Georgia Tech	13–3
73	October 18, 2008	Clemson, SC	Georgia Tech	21–17
74	September 10, 2009	Atlanta, GA	#15 Georgia Tech	30–27
75	December 5, 2009	Tampa, FL	#12 Georgia Tech^{‡}	39–34
76	October 23, 2010	Clemson, SC	Clemson	27–13
77	October 29, 2011	Atlanta, GA	Georgia Tech	31–17
78	October 6, 2012	Clemson, SC	#15 Clemson	47–31
79	November 14, 2013	Clemson, SC	#8 Clemson	55–31
80	November 15, 2014	Atlanta, GA	#24 Georgia Tech	28–6
81	October 10, 2015	Clemson, SC	#6 Clemson	43–24
82	September 22, 2016	Atlanta, GA	#5 Clemson	26–7
83	October 28, 2017	Clemson, SC	#7 Clemson	24–10
84	September 22, 2018	Atlanta, GA	#3 Clemson	49–21
85	August 29, 2019	Clemson, SC	#1 Clemson	52–14
86	October 17, 2020	Atlanta, GA	#1 Clemson	73–7
87	September 18, 2021	Clemson, SC	#6 Clemson	14–8
88	September 5, 2022	Atlanta, GA	#4 Clemson	41–10
89	November 11, 2023	Clemson, SC	Clemson	42–21
90	September 13, 2025	Atlanta, GA	Georgia Tech	24–21
91	November 14, 2026	Clemson, SC	Georgia Tech	20–6
Series: Georgia Tech leads 52–36–2
‡ Georgia Tech vacated win as part of NCAA sanctions

== See also ==
- List of NCAA college football rivalry games
