= 1959 Detroit Titans football team =

American college football season

1959 Detroit Titans football
- Conference: Independent
- Record: 6–4
- Head coach: Jim Miller (1st season)
- Home stadium: University of Detroit Stadium

1959 Midwestern major college football independents records
	Conf.			Overall
Team	W	L	T	W		L		T
Detroit		–		6	–	4	–	0
No. 17 Notre Dame		–		5	–	5	–	0
Dayton		–		3	–	7	–	0
Marquette		–		3	–	7	–	0
Rankings from AP poll

The 1959 Detroit Titans football team represented the University of Detroit as an independent during the 1959 college football season. In their first year under head coach Jim Miller, the Titans compiled a 6–4 record and were outscored by a combined total of 199 to 139.

Seven players from the 1959 Detroit team went on to play in the National Football League (NFL): Grady Alderman, Bruce Maher, Ernie Fritsch, Larry Vargo, Jim Shorter, Steve Stonebreaker, and Frank Jackunas. The team's statistical leaders included Tony Hanley with 544 passing yards, Bruce Maher with 595 rushing yards and 66 points scored, and Tom Chapman with 270 receiving yards.

== Schedule ==
Date	Opponent	Site	Result	Attendance	Source
September 18	George Washington	University of Detroit Stadium; Detroit, MI	W 38–6	19,609	
September 26	at Marquette	Milwaukee, WI	W 14–0		
October 2	Kentucky	University of Detroit Stadium; Detroit, MI	L 7–32	20,460	
October 9	at Tulane	Tulane Stadium; New Orleans, LA	L 0–25		
October 17	Xavier	University of Detroit Stadium; Detroit, MI	W 38–14		
October 24	at Tulsa	Skelly Stadium; Tulsa, OK	L 6–21	12,120	
October 30	Boston College	University of Detroit Stadium; Detroit, MI	L 9–21	15,305	
November 7	at Dayton	UD Stadium; Dayton, OH	W 33–14		
November 14	at Western Michigan	Waldo Stadium; Kalamazoo, MI	W 14–0	6,500	
November 21	Villanova	University of Detroit Stadium; Detroit, MI	W 40–6	10,365	
