= 1959 Oklahoma State Cowboys football team =

American college football season

1959 Oklahoma State Cowboys football
- Conference: Independent
- Record: 6–4
- Head coach: Cliff Speegle (5th season)
- Home stadium: Lewis Field

1959 Southern major college football independents records
	Conf.			Overall
Team	W	L	T	W		L		T
Miami (FL)		–		6	–	4	–	0
Oklahoma State		–		6	–	4	–	0
Navy		–		5	–	4	–	1
Florida State		–		4	–	6	–	0
Texas Tech		–		4	–	6	–	0

The 1959 Oklahoma State Cowboys football team represented Oklahoma State University–Stillwater as an independent during the 1959 college football season. In their fifth season under head coach Cliff Speegle, the Cowboys compiled a 6–4 record and outscored opponents by a combined total of 181 to 161.

On offense, the 1959 team averaged 18.1 points scored, 195.2 rushing yards, and 118.5 passing yards per game. On defense, the team allowed an average of 15.1 points scored, 195.2 rushing yards, and 83.1 passing yards per game The team's statistical leaders included Jim Dillard with 582 rushing yards, Dick Soergel with 1,100 passing yards, Bill Dodson with 286 receiving yards, and Tony Banfield with 66 points scored.

The team played its home games at Lewis Field in Stillwater, Oklahoma.

== Schedule ==
Date	Opponent	Site	Result	Attendance	Source
September 19	Cincinnati	Lewis Field; Stillwater, OK	L 9–22	20,000	
September 26	at Arkansas	War Memorial Stadium; Little Rock, AR	L 7–13	30,000	
October 3	at Kansas State	Memorial Stadium; Manhattan, KS	W 27–21	8,500	
October 10	Tulsa	Lewis Field; Stillwater, OK (rivalry)	W 26–0	21,000	
October 17	Houston	Lewis Field; Stillwater, OK	W 19–12	13,000	
October 24	Wichita^{†}	Lewis Field; Stillwater, OK	W 34–14	34,000	
October 31	at Marquette	Marquette Stadium; Milwaukee, WI	W 18–12	15,300	
November 7	Denver	Lewis Field; Stillwater, OK	W 20–12	15,000	
November 14	at Kansas	Memorial Stadium; Lawrence, KS	L 14–28	15,000	
November 28	at No. 17 Oklahoma	Oklahoma Memorial Stadium; Norman, OK (Bedlam Series)	L 7–17	59,136	
^{†}Homecoming; Rankings from AP Poll released prior to the game

== After the season ==
The 1960 NFL draft was held on November 30, 1959. The following Cowboys were selected.

Round	Pick	Player	Position	NFL club
8	89	Don Hitt	Center	Green Bay Packers
