= 1959 Virginia Tech Gobblers football team =

American college football season

1959 Virginia Tech Gobblers football
- Conference: Southern Conference
- Record: 6–4 (3–1 SoCon)
- Head coach: Frank Moseley (9th season)
- Home stadium: Miles Stadium

1959 Southern Conference football standings
	Conf.					Overall
Team	W		L		T	W		L		T
VMI $	5	–	0	–	1	8	–	1	–	1
The Citadel	5	–	1	–	0	8	–	2	–	0
Virginia Tech	3	–	1	–	0	6	–	4	–	0
Furman	3	–	2	–	0	3	–	7	–	0
Richmond	4	–	3	–	1	4	–	5	–	1
West Virginia	2	–	2	–	0	3	–	7	–	0
William & Mary	2	–	5	–	0	4	–	6	–	0
Davidson	0	–	5	–	0	1	–	8	–	0
George Washington	0	–	5	–	0	1	–	8	–	0
$ – Conference champion; Rankings from AP Poll

The 1959 Virginia Tech Gobblers football team represented the Virginia Polytechnic Institute or VPI (now known as Virginia Polytechnic Institute and State University or Virginia Tech) as a member of the Southern Conference (SoCon) during the 1959 college football season. Led by ninth-year head coach Frank Moseley the Gobblers compiled an overall record of 6–4 with a mark of 3–1 in conference play, and finished third in the SoCon. VPI played home games at Miles Stadium in Blacksburg, Virginia.

== Schedule ==
Date	Opponent	Site	TV	Result	Attendance	Source
September 19	vs. NC State*	Foreman Field; Norfolk, VA		L 13–15	12,000	
September 26	at Wake Forest*	Bowman Gray Stadium; Winston-Salem, NC		L 18–27	9,000	
October 3	vs. William & Mary	Victory Stadium; Roanoke, VA (Harvest Bowl)		W 20–14	19,000	
October 10	Florida State*^{†}	Miles Stadium; Blacksburg, VA	WSLS-TV	L 6–7	15,000	
October 17	vs. Virginia*	City Stadium; Richmond, VA (Tobacco Bowl, rivalry)		W 40–14	24,000	
October 24	at Villanova*	Villanova Stadium; Villanova, PA		W 24–14	7,965	
October 31	Richmond	Miles Stadium; Blacksburg, VA		W 51–29		
November 7	at West Texas State*	Buffalo Bowl; Canyon, TX		W 26–21		
November 14	at West Virginia	Mountaineer Field; Morgantown, WV (rivalry)		W 12–0	8,000	
November 26	vs. VMI	Victory Stadium; Roanoke, VA (rivalry)		L 12–37	27,500	
*Non-conference game; ^{†}Homecoming

== Roster ==
The following players were members of the 1959 football team according to the roster published in the 1960 edition of The Bugle, the Virginia Tech yearbook.

VPI 1959 roster
Ray Barile; Clyde Barnette; Edwin M. Bartrug, Jr.; Andy Beckstoffer; Tom Betz; Charles Philip Blankenship; Herb Bowling; Kenneth Arnold Byrd; Robert M. Crabtree; Carroll Dale (Capt.); Bloice Davison; Frank H. Eastman; John Farmer; Jim Farr; David W. Gillespie; Bob Harris; Walter Milton Harris; William O. Heintz; Pat Henry	Gary Hilton; Charles F. Hines; Robert Gerald Holbrook; Leo Howard; Ben Hunter; Don Jensen; Harold Jones; Mac Kincaid; Warren Maccaroni; Ray Massie; William Roderick McGinnis; David Mitchell; Warren Morris; Joe Moss; Thomas Ellis O'Brien; Don Oakes; Jim Paine; Noah Redding "Buddy" Perry; Charles Warren Price, Jr.	Art Pruett; William Alger Pugh; Elmer Reed; Bill Robertson; Sam Shaffer; Dickie Snead; Charlie Speck; Chuck Stephens; Terry L. Strock; Rick Tolley; Amos Leon Tomblin; Donald Ray Vaught; Bernie Vishneski; Harold Ward; Johnny Watkins; Arthur Allen Whittier; Donald E. Womeldorph; Mike Zeno
