= 1959 Rice Owls football team =

American college football season

1959 Rice Owls football
- Conference: Southwest Conference
- Record: 1–7–2 (1–4–1 SWC)
- Head coach: Jess Neely (20th season)
- Home stadium: Rice Stadium

1959 Southwest Conference football standings
	Conf.					Overall
Team	W		L		T	W		L		T
No. 9 Arkansas +	5	–	1	–	0	9	–	2	–	0
No. 4 Texas +	5	–	1	–	0	9	–	2	–	0
No. 7 TCU +	5	–	1	–	0	8	–	3	–	0
SMU	2	–	3	–	1	5	–	4	–	1
Baylor	2	–	4	–	0	4	–	6	–	0
Rice	1	–	4	–	1	1	–	7	–	2
Texas A&M	0	–	6	–	0	3	–	7	–	0
+ – Conference co-champions; Rankings from AP Poll

The 1959 Rice Owls football team represented Rice Institute during the 1959 college football season. The Owls were led by 20th-year head coach Jess Neely and played their home games at Rice Stadium in Houston, Texas. They competed as members of the Southwest Conference, finishing in sixth.

== Schedule ==
Date	Opponent	Site	TV	Result	Attendance	Source
September 19	at No. 1 LSU*	Tiger Stadium; Baton Rouge, LA	NBC	L 3–26	48,613	
October 3	at Duke*	Duke Stadium; Durham, NC		L 7–24	21,000	
October 10	No. 17 Florida*	Rice Stadium; Houston, TX		T 13–13	33,449	
October 17	No. T–15 SMU	Rice Stadium; Houston, TX (rivalry)		T 13–13	65,000	
October 24	at No. 3 Texas	Memorial Stadium; Austin, TX (rivalry)		L 6–28	57,000	
October 31	No. 12 Clemson*	Rice Stadium; Houston, TX		L 0–19	27,000	
November 7	No. 16 Arkansas	Rice Stadium; Houston, TX		L 10–14	39,000	
November 14	Texas A&M	Rice Stadium; Houston, TX		W 7–2	35,000	
November 21	at No. 10 TCU	Amon G. Carter Stadium; Fort Worth, TX		L 6–35	25,000	
November 28	Baylor	Rice Stadium; Houston, TX		L 21–23	30,000	
*Non-conference game; Rankings from AP Poll released prior to the game
