= 1959 Wichita Shockers football team =

American college football season

1959 Wichita Shockers football
- Conference: Missouri Valley Conference
- Record: 5–4–1 (1–2–1 MVC)
- Head coach: Woody Woodard (3rd season)
- Home stadium: Veterans Field

1959 Missouri Valley Conference football standings
	Conf.					Overall
Team	W		L		T	W		L		T
North Texas State +	3	–	1	–	0	9	–	2	–	0
Houston +	3	–	1	–	0	3	–	7	–	0
Tulsa	2	–	2	–	0	5	–	5	–	0
Wichita	1	–	2	–	1	5	–	4	–	1
Cincinnati	0	–	3	–	1		5	–	4
+ – Conference co-champions

The 1959 Wichita Shockers football team, sometimes known as the Wheatshockers, was an American football team that represented Wichita University (now known as Wichita State University) as a member of the Missouri Valley Conference during the 1959 college football season. In its third and final season under head coach Woody Woodard, the team compiled a 5–4–1 record (1–2–1 against conference opponents), finished in fourth place out of five teams in the MVC, and outscored opponents by a total of 181 to 161. The team played its home games at Veterans Field, now known as Cessna Stadium.

== Schedule ==
Date	Opponent	Site	Result	Attendance	Source
September 19	at Kansas State*	Memorial Stadium; Manhattan, KS	W 19–0	12,500	
September 26	Hardin–Simmons*	Veterans Field; Wichita, KS	W 27–13	12,293	
October 9	at George Washington*	Griffith Stadium; Washington, DC	W 21–0	4,500	
October 17	Cincinnati	Veterans Field; Wichita, KS	T 28–28	15,000	
October 24	at Oklahoma State*	Lewis Field; Stillwater, OK	L 14–34	34,000	
October 31	at North Texas State	Fouts Field; Denton, TX	L 0–12		
November 7	Houston	Veterans Field; Wichita, KS	L 13–28	12,000	
November 14	Drake*	Veterans Field; Wichita, KS	W 20–7	4,000	
November 21	at Dayton*	UD Stadium; Dayton, OH	L 13–18		
November 26	Tulsa	Veterans Field; Wichita, KS	W 26–21	6,000	
*Non-conference game
