= 1959 William & Mary Indians football team =

American college football season

1959 William & Mary Indians football
- Conference: Southern Conference
- Record: 4–6 (2–5 SoCon)
- Head coach: Milt Drewer (3rd season)
- Captains: Gary Lynn; Lauren Kardatzke
- Home stadium: Cary Field

1959 Southern Conference football standings
| | Conf. | | | | | Overall |
| Team | W | | L | | T | W | | L | | T |
|---|---|---|---|---|---|---|---|---|---|---|
| VMI $ | 5 | – | 0 | – | 1 | 8 | – | 1 | – | 1 |
| The Citadel | 5 | – | 1 | – | 0 | 8 | – | 2 | – | 0 |
| Virginia Tech | 3 | – | 1 | – | 0 | 6 | – | 4 | – | 0 |
| Furman | 3 | – | 2 | – | 0 | 3 | – | 7 | – | 0 |
| Richmond | 4 | – | 3 | – | 1 | 4 | – | 5 | – | 1 |
| West Virginia | 2 | – | 2 | – | 0 | 3 | – | 7 | – | 0 |
| William & Mary | 2 | – | 5 | – | 0 | 4 | – | 6 | – | 0 |
| Davidson | 0 | – | 5 | – | 0 | 1 | – | 8 | – | 0 |
| George Washington | 0 | – | 5 | – | 0 | 1 | – | 8 | – | 0 |
$ – Conference champion; Rankings from AP Poll

The 1959 William & Mary Indians football team represented the College of William & Mary as a member of the Southern Conference (SoCon) during the 1959 college football season. In their third season under head coach Milt Drewer, William & Mary compiled am overall record of 4–6 record with a mark of 2–5 in conference play, placing seventh in the SoCon.

== Schedule ==
| Date | Opponent | Site | Result | Attendance | Source |
|---|---|---|---|---|---|
| September 19 | at Virginia* | Scott Stadium; Charlottesville, VA | W 37–0 | 13,000 | |
| September 26 | at No. 13 Navy* | Navy–Marine Corps Memorial Stadium; Annapolis, MD | L 2–29 | 25,003 | |
| October 3 | vs. Virginia Tech | Victory Stadium; Roanoke, VA (Harvest Bowl) | L 14–20 | 19,000 | |
| October 10 | Furman | Cary Field; Williamsburg, VA | L 7–8 | | |
| October 17 | vs. VMI | Foreman Field; Norfolk, VA (Oyster Bowl, rivalry) | L 7–26 | 5,000 | |
| October 24 | George Washington | Cary Field; Williamsburg, VA | W 14–7 | 5,000 | |
| October 31 | The Citadel | Cary Field; Williamsburg, VA | L 13–38 | 4,500 | |
| November 7 | at Davidson | Richardson Stadium; Davidson, NC | W 25–7 | 4,000 | |
| November 14 | at Florida State* | Doak Campbell Stadium; Tallahassee, FL | W 9–0 | 16,700 | |
| November 26 | at Richmond | City Stadium; Richmond, VA (rivalry) | L 12–20 | 7,500 | |
*Non-conference game; Rankings from AP Poll released prior to the game
