= 1959 Houston Cougars football team =

American college football season

1959 Houston Cougars football

MVC co-champion
- Conference: Missouri Valley Conference
- Record: 3–7 (3–1 MVC)
- Head coach: Hal Lahar (3rd season)
- Captains: Claude King; Howard Evans
- Home stadium: Rice Stadium

1959 Missouri Valley Conference football standings
| | Conf. | | | | | Overall |
| Team | W | | L | | T | W | | L | | T |
|---|---|---|---|---|---|---|---|---|---|---|
| North Texas State + | 3 | – | 1 | – | 0 | 9 | – | 2 | – | 0 |
| Houston + | 3 | – | 1 | – | 0 | 3 | – | 7 | – | 0 |
| Tulsa | 2 | – | 2 | – | 0 | 5 | – | 5 | – | 0 |
| Wichita | 1 | – | 2 | – | 1 | 5 | – | 4 | – | 1 |
| Cincinnati | 0 | – | 3 | – | 1 | | 5 | – | 4 |
+ – Conference co-champions

The 1959 Houston Cougars football team was an American football team that represented the University of Houston in the Missouri Valley Conference (MVC) during the 1959 college football season. In its third season under head coach Hal Lahar, the team compiled a 3–7 record (3–1 against conference opponents) and tied with North Texas State for the MVC championship. Claude King and Howard Evans were the team captains. The team played its home games at Rice Stadium in Houston.

== Schedule ==
| Date | Opponent | Site | Result | Attendance | Source |
|---|---|---|---|---|---|
| September 19 | No. 8 Ole Miss* | Rice Stadium; Houston, TX | L 0–16 | 45,000 | |
| September 26 | Alabama* | Rice Stadium; Houston, TX | L 0–3 | 27,000 | |
| October 3 | Cincinnati | Rice Stadium; Houston, TX | W 13–12 | 16,000 | |
| October 10 | at Texas A&M* | Kyle Field; College Station, TX | L 6–28 | 25,000 | |
| October 17 | at Oklahoma State* | Lewis Field; Stillwater, OK | L 12–19 | 13,000 | |
| October 24 | North Texas State^{†} | Rice Stadium; Houston, TX | L 6–7 | 12,000 | |
| October 31 | at Tulsa | Skelly Stadium; Tulsa, OK | W 22–13 | 12,034 | |
| November 7 | at Wichita | Veterans Field; Wichita, KS | W 28–13 | 12,000 | |
| November 14 | at Texas Tech* | Jones Stadium; Lubbock, TX (rivalry) | L 0–27 | 20,000 | |
| November 26 | Washington State* | Rice Stadium; Houston, TX | L 18–32 | 6,000 | |
*Non-conference game; ^{†}Homecoming; Rankings from AP Poll released prior to the game
