= 1959 Texas Tech Red Raiders football team =

American college football season

1959 Texas Tech Red Raiders football
- Conference: Independent
- Record: 4–6
- Head coach: DeWitt Weaver (9th season)
- Offensive scheme: T formation
- Base defense: 5–3
- Home stadium: Jones Stadium

1959 Southern major college football independents records
	Conf.			Overall
Team	W	L	T	W		L		T
Miami (FL)		–		6	–	4	–	0
Oklahoma State		–		6	–	4	–	0
Navy		–		5	–	4	–	1
Florida State		–		4	–	6	–	0
Texas Tech		–		4	–	6	–	0

The 1959 Texas Tech Red Raiders football team represented Texas Technological College—now known as Texas Tech University—as an independent during the 1959 college football season. In their ninth season under head coach DeWitt Weaver, the Red Raiders compiled a 4–6 record and were outscored by opponents by a combined total of 158 to 139. The team's statistical leaders included Ken Talkington with 603 passing yards, Carl Gatlin with 211 rushing yards, and Bake Turner with 444 receiving yards. The team played its home games at Clifford B. and Audrey Jones Stadium.

== Schedule ==
Date	Opponent	Site	Result	Attendance	Source
September 19	Texas A&M	Cotton Bowl; Dallas, TX (rivalry)	W 20–14	25,000	
September 26	Oregon State	Jones Stadium; Lubbock, TX	W 15–14	20,000	
October 3	Tulsa	Jones Stadium; Lubbock, TX	W 8–7	12,000	
October 10	TCU	Jones Stadium; Lubbock, TX (rivalry)	L 8–14	23,000	
October 17	at Baylor	Baylor Stadium; Waco, TX (rivalry)	L 7–14	20,000	
October 24	at SMU	Cotton Bowl; Dallas, TX	L 13–21	30,000	
October 30	at Tulane	Tulane Stadium; New Orleans, LA	L 7–17	15,000	
November 7	at Arizona	Arizona Stadium; Tucson, AZ	L 26–30	14,500	
November 14	Houston^{†}	Jones Stadium; Lubbock, TX (rivalry)	W 27–0	20,000	
November 21	at No. 13 Arkansas	War Memorial Stadium; Little Rock, AR (rivalry)	L 8–27	35,000	
^{†}Homecoming; Rankings from AP Poll released prior to the game
