= 1959 Florida State Seminoles football team =

American college football season

1959 Florida State Seminoles football
- Conference: Independent
- Record: 4–6
- Head coach: Perry Moss (1st season)
- Captains: John Spivey; Al Ulmer
- Home stadium: Doak Campbell Stadium

1959 Southern major college football independents records
	Conf.			Overall
Team	W	L	T	W		L		T
Miami (FL)		–		6	–	4	–	0
Oklahoma State		–		6	–	4	–	0
Navy		–		5	–	4	–	1
Florida State		–		4	–	6	–	0
Texas Tech		–		4	–	6	–	0

The 1959 Florida State Seminoles football team represented Florida State University as an independent during the 1959 college football season. Led by Perry Moss in his first and only season as head coach, the Seminoles compiled a record of 4–6.

== Schedule ==
Date	Opponent	Site	Result	Attendance	Source
September 19	Wake Forest	Doak Campbell Stadium; Tallahassee, FL	L 20–22	19,300	
September 26	The Citadel	Doak Campbell Stadium; Tallahassee, FL	W 47–6	12,392	
October 3	Miami (FL)	Doak Campbell Stadium; Tallahassee, FL (rivalry)	L 6–7	18,600	
October 10	at Virginia Tech	Miles Stadium; Blacksburg, VA	W 7–6	15,000	
October 17	at No. T–14 (small) Memphis State	Crump Stadium; Memphis, TN	L 6–16	9,536	
October 24	Richmond	Doak Campbell Stadium; Tallahassee, FL	W 22–6	15,200	
October 31	at No. 14 Georgia	Sanford Stadium; Athens, GA	L 0–42	30,000	
November 14	William & Mary	Doak Campbell Stadium; Tallahassee, FL	L 0–9	16,700	
November 21	at Florida	Florida Field; Gainesville, FL (rivalry)	L 8–18	38,359	
November 28	at Tampa	Phillips Field; Tampa, FL	W 33–0	6,500	
Rankings from AP Poll released prior to the game

== Roster ==
- QB Joe Majors, Sr.
