= 1959 NC State Wolfpack football team =

American college football season

1959 NC State Wolfpack football
- Conference: Atlantic Coast Conference
- Record: 1–9 (0–6 ACC)
- Head coach: Earle Edwards (6th season)
- Home stadium: Riddick Stadium

1959 Atlantic Coast Conference football standings
	Conf.					Overall
Team	W		L		T	W		L		T
No. 11 Clemson $	6	–	1	–	0	9	–	2	–	0
North Carolina	5	–	2	–	0	5	–	5	–	0
Maryland	4	–	2	–	0	5	–	5	–	0
South Carolina	4	–	3	–	0	6	–	4	–	0
Wake Forest	4	–	3	–	0	6	–	4	–	0
Duke	2	–	3	–	0	4	–	6	–	0
NC State	0	–	6	–	0	1	–	9	–	0
Virginia	0	–	5	–	0	0	–	10	–	0
$ – Conference champion; Rankings from AP poll

The 1959 NC State Wolfpack football team represented North Carolina State University during the 1959 college football season. The Wolfpack were led by sixth-year head coach Earle Edwards and played their home games at Riddick Stadium in Raleigh, North Carolina. They competed as members of the Atlantic Coast Conference, finishing in last with an 0–6 conference record.

== Schedule ==
Date	Opponent	Site	Result	Attendance	Source
September 19	vs. Virginia Tech*	Foreman Field; Norfolk, VA	W 15–13	12,000	
October 3	at North Carolina	Kenan Memorial Stadium; Chapel Hill, NC (rivalry)	L 12–20	38,000	
October 10	at Clemson	Memorial Stadium; Clemson, SC (rivalry)	L 0–23	19,000	
October 17	Wake Forest	Riddick Stadium; Raleigh, NC (rivalry)	L 14–17	16,000	
October 24	Duke	Riddick Stadium; Raleigh, NC (rivalry)	L 15–17	14,000	
October 31	Wyoming*	Riddick Stadium; Raleigh, NC	L 0–26	13,500	
November 7	at No. 2 Mississippi Southern*	Ladd Stadium; Mobile, AL	L 14–19	12,000	
November 13	at UCLA*	Los Angeles Memorial Coliseum; Los Angeles, CA	L 12–21	21,112–21,149	
November 21	at South Carolina	Carolina Stadium; Columbia, SC	L 7–12	28,000	
December 5	at Maryland	Byrd Stadium; College Park, MD	L 28–33	15,000	
*Non-conference game; Rankings from UPI Poll released prior to the game
