= 1959 Davidson Wildcats football team =

American college football season

1959 Davidson Wildcats football
- Conference: Southern Conference
- Record: 1–8 (0–5 SoCon)
- Head coach: Bill Dole (8th season)
- Home stadium: Richardson Stadium

1959 Southern Conference football standings
	Conf.					Overall
Team	W		L		T	W		L		T
VMI $	5	–	0	–	1	8	–	1	–	1
The Citadel	5	–	1	–	0	8	–	2	–	0
Virginia Tech	3	–	1	–	0	6	–	4	–	0
Furman	3	–	2	–	0	3	–	7	–	0
Richmond	4	–	3	–	1	4	–	5	–	1
West Virginia	2	–	2	–	0	3	–	7	–	0
William & Mary	2	–	5	–	0	4	–	6	–	0
Davidson	0	–	5	–	0	1	–	8	–	0
George Washington	0	–	5	–	0	1	–	8	–	0
$ – Conference champion; Rankings from AP Poll

The 1959 Davidson Wildcats football team represented Davidson College as a member of the Southern Conference (SoCon) during the 1959 college football season. Led by eighth-year head coach Bill Dole, the Wildcats compiled an overall record of 1–8 with a mark of 0–5 in conference play, tying for eighth in the SoCon.

== Schedule ==
Date	Opponent	Site	Result	Attendance	Source
September 19	vs. Catawba*	American Legion Memorial Stadium; Charlotte, NC	W 42–6	3,000	
September 26	Presbyterian*	Richardson Stadium; Davidson, NC	L 21–25		
October 3	at The Citadel	Johnson Hagood Stadium; Charleston, SC	L 7–13		
October 10	at Richmond	City Stadium; Richmond, VA	L 7–21	2,000	
October 24	at VMI	Wilson Field; Lexington, VA	L 7–34		
October 31	Wofford*	Richardson Stadium; Davidson, NC	L 20–27		
November 7	William & Mary	Richardson Stadium; Davidson, NC	L 7–25	4,000	
November 14	Lehigh*	Richardson Stadium; Davidson, NC	L 0–14	5,000	
November 20	at Furman	Sirrine Stadium; Greenville, SC	L 7–35		
*Non-conference game
