= Bud Kerr =

American football player (1916–1964)

Bill Kerr
- Kerr in 1946

No. 50
- Position: End

Personal information
- Born: November 10, 1915; Tarrytown, New York, U.S.
- Died: April 9, 1964 (aged 48); San Mateo, California, U.S.
- Listed height: 6 ft 0 in (1.83 m)
- Listed weight: 220 lb (100 kg)

Career information
- High school: Newburgh Free Academy (Newburgh, New York)
- College: Notre Dame (1936-1939)
- NFL draft: 1940: 14th round, 129th overall pick

Career history

Playing
- Los Angeles Dons (1946)

Coaching
- Washington University (1942) Assistant coach; Georgia Pre-Flight (1943) Assistant coach; Denver (1947-1948) Line coach; San Francisco (1949-1950) Line coach; Washington (1954-1955) Ends coach; Dayton (1956-1959) Head coach

Awards and highlights
- First-team All-American (1939)

Career AAFC statistics
- Receptions: 7
- Receiving yards: 122
- Interceptions: 1
- Stats at Pro Football Reference

Head coaching record
- Career: 15–24–1 (.388)

William Howard "Bud" Kerr (November 10, 1915 – April 9, 1964) was an American football player and coach. He was an All-American football player at Notre Dame in 1939. He later served as the head football coach at the University of Dayton, from 1956 to 1959.

== Biography ==
Kerr was born in Tarrytown, New York but moved to Newburgh at three years old. He attended Newburgh Free Academy where he was in the school band for his first three years and only joined the football team as a part-time player as a senior. After high school, he worked for four years in order to afford college.

Kerr attended the University of Notre Dame where he played college football at the end position for the Notre Dame Fighting Irish football team. He was selected by the Associated Press, the All-America Board, the Newspaper Enterprise Association, the Sporting News and the Walter Camp Football Foundation as a first-team end on the 1939 College Football All-America Team.

After graduating from Notre Dame, Kerr held assistant coaching positions at Washington University in St. Louis and, during World War II, at the U.S. Navy Pre-Flight School at Athens, Georgia. Kerr served as a line coach at the University of Denver in 1947 and 1948 and then moved to the University of San Francisco to take on the same role there in 1949. He was hired as the head football coach at the University of San Francisco, succeeding fellow Notre Dame alumnus, Joe Kuharich, in December 1951. However, the San Francisco Dons football program was discontinued in early 1952 and did not resume until several years later. In February 1956, after a stint as the ends coach of the University of Washington Huskies, Kerr was hired as the head football coach for the University of Dayton Flyers football team. He coached the Flyers from 1956 to 1959, compiling a record of 15–24–1.

Kerr later worked as a motel manager and an employee of Pioneer Carloading Co. in San Francisco.

Kerr died in his home at San Mateo, California in 1964 after complaining of chest pains. He was buried in San Francisco at Golden Gate National Cemetery.

== Head coaching record ==
Year	Team	Overall	Conference	Standing	Bowl/playoffs
Dayton Flyers (Independent) (1956–1959)
1956	Dayton	4–6			
1957	Dayton	6–3–1			
1958	Dayton	2–8			
1959	Dayton	3–7			
Dayton:		15–24–1			
Total:		15–24–1			
