= 1959 Richmond Spiders football team =

American college football season

1959 Richmond Spiders football
- Conference: Southern Conference
- Record: 4–5–1 (4–3–1 SoCon)
- Head coach: Ed Merrick (9th season)
- Captains: Chuck Boone; Fred Caravetta
- Home stadium: City Stadium

1959 Southern Conference football standings
	Conf.					Overall
Team	W		L		T	W		L		T
VMI $	5	–	0	–	1	8	–	1	–	1
The Citadel	5	–	1	–	0	8	–	2	–	0
Virginia Tech	3	–	1	–	0	6	–	4	–	0
Furman	3	–	2	–	0	3	–	7	–	0
Richmond	4	–	3	–	1	4	–	5	–	1
West Virginia	2	–	2	–	0	3	–	7	–	0
William & Mary	2	–	5	–	0	4	–	6	–	0
Davidson	0	–	5	–	0	1	–	8	–	0
George Washington	0	–	5	–	0	1	–	8	–	0
$ – Conference champion; Rankings from AP Poll

The 1959 Richmond Spiders football team was an American football team that represented the University of Richmond as a member of the Southern Conference (SoCon) during the 1959 college football season. In their ninth season under head coach Ed Merrick, Richmond compiled a 4–5–1 record, with a mark of 4–3–1 in conference play, finishing in fifth place in the SoCon.

== Schedule ==
Date	Opponent	Site	Result	Attendance	Source
September 19	at Dayton*	UD Stadium; Dayton, OH	L 3–6	8,500	
September 26	at West Virginia	Mountaineer Field; Morgantown, WV	L 7–10	15,000	
October 3	vs. VMI	Portsmouth, VA	T 14–14	6,000	
October 10	Davidson	City Stadium; Richmond, VA	W 21–7	2,000	
October 17	at The Citadel	Johnson Hagood Stadium; Charleston, SC	L 7–8		
October 24	at Florida State*	Doak Campbell Stadium; Tallahassee, FL	L 6–22		
October 31	at Virginia Tech	Miles Stadium; Blacksburg, VA	L 29–51		
November 7	George Washington	City Stadium; Richmond, VA	W 26–0	1,000	
November 14	Furman	City Stadium; Richmond, VA	W 48–14	3,000	
November 26	William & Mary	City Stadium; Richmond, VA (rivalry)	W 20–12	7,500	
*Non-conference game
