= 1959 Virginia Cavaliers football team =

American college football season

1959 Virginia Cavaliers football
- Conference: Atlantic Coast Conference
- Record: 0–10 (0–5 ACC)
- Head coach: Dick Voris (2nd season)
- Captain: Robert Edwards
- Home stadium: Scott Stadium

1959 Atlantic Coast Conference football standings
	Conf.					Overall
Team	W		L		T	W		L		T
No. 11 Clemson $	6	–	1	–	0	9	–	2	–	0
North Carolina	5	–	2	–	0	5	–	5	–	0
Maryland	4	–	2	–	0	5	–	5	–	0
South Carolina	4	–	3	–	0	6	–	4	–	0
Wake Forest	4	–	3	–	0	6	–	4	–	0
Duke	2	–	3	–	0	4	–	6	–	0
NC State	0	–	6	–	0	1	–	9	–	0
Virginia	0	–	5	–	0	0	–	10	–	0
$ – Conference champion; Rankings from AP poll

The 1959 Virginia Cavaliers football team represented the University of Virginia during the 1959 college football season. The Cavaliers were led by second-year head coach Dick Voris and played their home games at Scott Stadium in Charlottesville, Virginia. They competed as members of the Atlantic Coast Conference, finishing in last. Virginia finished without a win and extended their losing streak to 18 games.

== Schedule ==
Date	Opponent	Site	Result	Attendance	Source
September 19	William & Mary*	Scott Stadium; Charlottesville, VA	L 0–37	13,000	
September 26	No. 5 Clemson	Scott Stadium; Charlottesville, VA	L 0–47	13,000	
October 3	at No. 19 Florida*	Florida Field; Gainesville, FL	L 10–55	25,136	
October 10	vs. VMI*	City Stadium; Lynchburg, VA	L 12–19	7,000	
October 17	vs. Virginia Tech*	City Stadium; Richmond, VA (Tobacco Bowl, rivalry)	L 14–40	24,000	
October 24	Vanderbilt*^{†}	Scott Stadium; Charlottesville, VA	L 0–33	11,000	
October 31	at Wake Forest	Bowman Gray Stadium; Winston-Salem, NC	L 12–34	7,500	
November 7	South Carolina	Scott Stadium; Charlottesville, VA	L 20–32	10,000	
November 14	at North Carolina	Kenan Memorial Stadium; Chapel Hill, NC (South's Oldest Rivalry)	L 0–41	21,000	
November 21	at Maryland	Byrd Stadium; College Park, MD (rivalry)	L 12–55	16,000	
*Non-conference game; ^{†}Homecoming; Rankings from AP Poll released prior to the game
