= 1959 Baylor Bears football team =

American college football season

1959 Baylor Bears football
- Conference: Southwest Conference
- Record: 4–6 (2–4 SWC)
- Head coach: John Bridgers (1st season)
- Captains: Al Witcher; Gayle Watkins; Goose Gonsoulin
- Home stadium: Baylor Stadium

1959 Southwest Conference football standings
| | Conf. | | | | | Overall |
| Team | W | | L | | T | W | | L | | T |
|---|---|---|---|---|---|---|---|---|---|---|
| No. 9 Arkansas + | 5 | – | 1 | – | 0 | 9 | – | 2 | – | 0 |
| No. 4 Texas + | 5 | – | 1 | – | 0 | 9 | – | 2 | – | 0 |
| No. 7 TCU + | 5 | – | 1 | – | 0 | 8 | – | 3 | – | 0 |
| SMU | 2 | – | 3 | – | 1 | 5 | – | 4 | – | 1 |
| Baylor | 2 | – | 4 | – | 0 | 4 | – | 6 | – | 0 |
| Rice | 1 | – | 4 | – | 1 | 1 | – | 7 | – | 2 |
| Texas A&M | 0 | – | 6 | – | 0 | 3 | – | 7 | – | 0 |
+ – Conference co-champions; Rankings from AP Poll

The 1959 Baylor Bears football team represented Baylor University as a member of the Southwest Conference (SWC) during the 1959 college football season. Led by first-year head coach John Bridgers, the Bears compiled an overall record of 4–6 with a mark of 2–4 in conference play, placing fifth in the SWC. Baylor played home games at Baylor Stadium in Waco, Texas.

== Schedule ==
| Date | Opponent | Site | Result | Attendance | Source |
|---|---|---|---|---|---|
| September 26 | at Colorado* | Folsom Field; Boulder, CO | W 15–7 | 23,761 | |
| October 3 | vs. No. 1 LSU* | State Fair Stadium; Shreveport, LA | L 0–22 | 32,308–35,455 | |
| October 10 | No. 19 Arkansas | Baylor Stadium; Waco, TX | L 7–23 | 24,000 | |
| October 17 | Texas Tech* | Baylor Stadium; Waco, TX (rivalry) | W 14–7 | 20,000 | |
| October 24 | at Texas A&M | Kyle Field; College Station, TX (rivalry) | W 13–0 | 17,500 | |
| October 31 | No. 15 TCU^{†} | Baylor Stadium; Waco, TX (rivalry) | L 0–14 | 26,000 | |
| November 7 | at No. 3 Texas | Texas Memorial Stadium; Austin, TX (rivalry) | L 12–13 | 40,000 | |
| November 14 | at No. 4 USC* | Los Angeles Memorial Coliseum; Los Angeles, CA | L 8–17 | 43,832 | |
| November 21 | SMU | Baylor Stadium; Waco, TX | L 14–30 | 25,000 | |
| November 28 | at Rice | Rice Stadium; Houston, TX | W 23–21 | 30,000 | |
*Non-conference game; ^{†}Homecoming; Rankings from AP Poll released prior to the game
