= 1959 Marquette Warriors football team =

American college football season

1959 Marquette Warriors football
- Conference: Independent
- Record: 3–7
- Head coach: Lisle Blackbourn (5th season)
- Home stadium: Marquette Stadium

1959 Midwestern major college football independents records
| | Conf. | | | Overall |
| Team | W | L | T | W | | L | | T |
|---|---|---|---|---|---|---|---|---|
| Detroit | | – | | 6 | – | 4 | – | 0 |
| No. 17 Notre Dame | | – | | 5 | – | 5 | – | 0 |
| Dayton | | – | | 3 | – | 7 | – | 0 |
| Marquette | | – | | 3 | – | 7 | – | 0 |
Rankings from AP poll

The 1959 Marquette Warriors football team was an American football team that represented Marquette University as an independent during the 1959 college football season. In its fifth non-consecutive season under head coach Lisle Blackbourn, the team compiled a 3–7 record and was outscored by a total of 214 to 172.

Marquette quarterback Peter Hall ranked among the leading quarterbacks in major-college football with 330 total plays (1st), 1,589 passing yards (2nd), 158.9 yards gained per game played (2nd), 237 pass attempts (second), 120 pass completions (3rd), 14 passing interceptions (3rd), seven passing touchdowns (7th), and 50.6% completion (9th).

The team played its home games at Marquette Stadium in Milwaukee.

== Schedule ==
| Date | Opponent | Site | Result | Attendance | Source |
|---|---|---|---|---|---|
| September 19 | Pittsburgh | Marquette Stadium; Milwaukee, WI | L 15–21 | 15,125 | |
| September 26 | Detroit | Marquette Stadium; Milwaukee, WI | L 0–14 | 4,165 | |
| October 3 | at No. 12 Wisconsin | Camp Randall Stadium; Madison, WI | L 6–44 | 47,970 | |
| October 10 | at Indiana | Memorial Stadium; Bloomington, IN | L 13–33 | 30,000 | |
| October 17 | at Pacific (CA) | Pacific Memorial Stadium; Stockton, CA | L 13–22 | 20,800 | |
| October 25 | at Boston College | Alumni Stadium; Chestnut Hill, MA | L 0–16 | 17,000 | |
| October 31 | Oklahoma State^{†} | Marquette Stadium; Milwaukee, WI | L 12–18 | 15,300 | |
| November 7 | North Dakota State | Marquette Stadium; Milwaukee, WI | W 48–0 | 7,200 | |
| November 14 | at Cincinnati | Nippert Stadium; Cincinnati, OH | W 35–34 | 14,000 | |
| November 21 | Holy Cross | Marquette Stadium; Milwaukee, WI | W 30–12 | 12,136 | |
^{†}Homecoming; Rankings from AP Poll released prior to the game

== Notable players ==
- George Andrie, sophomore
