= 1959 Duke Blue Devils football team =

American college football season

1959 Duke Blue Devils football
- Conference: Atlantic Coast Conference
- Record: 4–6 (2–3 ACC)
- Head coach: William D. Murray (9th season)
- MVP: Mike McGee
- Captain: Mike McGee
- Home stadium: Duke Stadium

1959 Atlantic Coast Conference football standings
	Conf.					Overall
Team	W		L		T	W		L		T
No. 11 Clemson $	6	–	1	–	0	9	–	2	–	0
North Carolina	5	–	2	–	0	5	–	5	–	0
Maryland	4	–	2	–	0	5	–	5	–	0
South Carolina	4	–	3	–	0	6	–	4	–	0
Wake Forest	4	–	3	–	0	6	–	4	–	0
Duke	2	–	3	–	0	4	–	6	–	0
NC State	0	–	6	–	0	1	–	9	–	0
Virginia	0	–	5	–	0	0	–	10	–	0
$ – Conference champion; Rankings from AP poll

The 1959 Duke Blue Devils football team was an American football team that represented Duke University as a member of the Atlantic Coast Conference (ACC) during the 1959 college football season. In their ninth year under head coach William D. Murray, the Blue Devils compiled an overall record of 4–6, with a conference record of 2–3, and finished sixth in the ACC.

== Schedule ==
Date	Opponent	Site	Result	Attendance	Source
September 19	at No. 14 South Carolina	Carolina Stadium; Columbia, SC	L 7–12	37,000	
September 26	at No. 12 Ohio State*	Ohio Stadium; Columbus, OH	L 13–14	82,834	
October 3	Rice*	Duke Stadium; Durham, NC	W 24–7	21,000	
October 10	at Pittsburgh*	Pitt Stadium; Pittsburgh, PA	L 0–12	38,749	
October 17	Army*^{†}	Duke Stadium; Durham, NC	L 6–21	33,500	
October 24	at NC State	Riddick Stadium; Raleigh, NC (rivalry)	W 17–15	14,000	
October 31	at No. 9 Georgia Tech*	Grant Field; Atlanta, GA	W 10–7	44,174	
November 7	at No. 10 Clemson	Memorial Stadium; Clemson, SC	L 0–6	40,000	
November 14	Wake Forest	Duke Stadium; Durham, NC (rivalry)	W 27–15	25,000	
November 21	North Carolina	Duke Stadium; Durham, NC (Victory Bell)	L 0–50	33,000	
*Non-conference game; ^{†}Homecoming; Rankings from AP Poll released prior to the game
