= 1959 Dayton Flyers football team =

American college football season

1959 Dayton Flyers football
- Conference: Independent
- Record: 3–7
- Head coach: Bud Kerr (4th season)
- Home stadium: UD Stadium

1959 Midwestern major college football independents records
	Conf.			Overall
Team	W	L	T	W		L		T
Detroit		–		6	–	4	–	0
No. 17 Notre Dame		–		5	–	5	–	0
Dayton		–		3	–	7	–	0
Marquette		–		3	–	7	–	0
Rankings from AP poll

The 1959 Dayton Flyers football team represented the University of Dayton as an independent during the 1959 college football season. In their fourth season under head coach Bud Kerr, the Flyers compiled a 3–7 record. Dayton played their home games at UD Stadium in Dayton, Ohio.

== Schedule ==
Date	Opponent	Site	Result	Attendance	Source
September 19	Richmond	UD Stadium; Dayton, OH	W 6–3	8,500	
September 26	at Cincinnati	Nippert Stadium; Cincinnati, OH	L 7–21	23,000	
October 3	at No. 14 Bowling Green	University Stadium; Bowling Green, OH	L 0–14	7,500	
October 10	at Holy Cross	Fitton Field; Worcester, MA	L 0–8	8,000	
October 17	at Louisville	Fairgrounds Stadium; Louisville, KY	L 6–32	4,972	
October 24	Xavier	UD Stadium; Dayton, OH	L 0–3		
October 31	at Villanova	Villanova Stadium; Villanova, PA	L 13–22	6,875	
November 7	Detroit	UD Stadium; Dayton, OH	L 14–33		
November 14	No. 8 Miami (OH)	UD Stadium; Dayton, OH	W 13–0	6,000	
November 21	Wichita	UD Stadium; Dayton, OH	W 18–13		
Rankings from UPI Poll released prior to the game; Source:
