= 1959 Texas A&M Aggies football team =

American college football season

1959 Texas A&M Aggies football
- Conference: Southwest Conference
- Record: 3–7 (0–6 SWC)
- Head coach: Jim Myers (2nd season)
- Home stadium: Kyle Field

1959 Southwest Conference football standings
	Conf.					Overall
Team	W		L		T	W		L		T
No. 9 Arkansas +	5	–	1	–	0	9	–	2	–	0
No. 4 Texas +	5	–	1	–	0	9	–	2	–	0
No. 7 TCU +	5	–	1	–	0	8	–	3	–	0
SMU	2	–	3	–	1	5	–	4	–	1
Baylor	2	–	4	–	0	4	–	6	–	0
Rice	1	–	4	–	1	1	–	7	–	2
Texas A&M	0	–	6	–	0	3	–	7	–	0
+ – Conference co-champions; Rankings from AP Poll

The 1959 Texas A&M Aggies football team represented Texas A&M University in the 1959 college football season as a member of the Southwest Conference (SWC). The Aggies were led by head coach Jim Myers in his second season and finished with a record of three wins and seven losses (3–7 overall, 0–6 in the SWC).

== Schedule ==
Date	Opponent	Site	Result	Attendance	Source
September 19	vs. Texas Tech*	Cotton Bowl; Dallas, TX (rivalry)	L 14–20	25,000	
September 26	at Michigan State*	Spartan Stadium; East Lansing, MI	W 9–7	49,507–49,529	
October 3	at No. 1 (small) Mississippi Southern*	Ernest F. Ladd Memorial Stadium; Mobile, AL	W 7–3	25,781	
October 10	Houston*	Kyle Field; College Station, TX	W 28–6	25,000	
October 17	at TCU	Amon G. Carter Stadium; Fort Worth, TX (rivalry)	L 6–39	42,000	
October 24	Baylor	Kyle Field; College Station, TX (rivalry)	L 0–13	17,500	
October 31	at No. 17 Arkansas	Razorback Stadium; Fayetteville, AR (rivalry)	L 7–12	30,000	
November 7	SMU	Kyle Field; College Station, TX	L 11–14	19,000	
November 14	at Rice	Rice Stadium; Houston, TX	L 2–7	35,000	
November 28	No. 4 Texas	Kyle Field; College Station, TX (rivalry)	L 17–20	40,000	
*Non-conference game; Rankings from AP Poll released prior to the game

== Roster ==
- QB Charlie Milstead, Sr.
