= 1959 Texas Longhorns football team =

American college football season

1959 Texas Longhorns football

SWC co-champion

Cotton Bowl Classic, L 14–23 vs. Syracuse
- Conference: Southwest Conference

Ranking
- Coaches: No. 4
- AP: No. 4
- Record: 9–2 (5–1 SWC)
- Head coach: Darrell Royal (3rd season)
- Home stadium: Memorial Stadium

1959 Southwest Conference football standings
	Conf.					Overall
Team	W		L		T	W		L		T
No. 9 Arkansas +	5	–	1	–	0	9	–	2	–	0
No. 4 Texas +	5	–	1	–	0	9	–	2	–	0
No. 7 TCU +	5	–	1	–	0	8	–	3	–	0
SMU	2	–	3	–	1	5	–	4	–	1
Baylor	2	–	4	–	0	4	–	6	–	0
Rice	1	–	4	–	1	1	–	7	–	2
Texas A&M	0	–	6	–	0	3	–	7	–	0
+ – Conference co-champions; Rankings from AP Poll

The 1959 Texas Longhorns football team was an American football team that represented the University of Texas (now known as the University of Texas at Austin) as a member of the Southwest Conference (SWC) during the 1959 college football season. In their third year under head coach Darrell Royal, the Longhorns compiled an overall record of 9–2, with a mark of 5–1 in conference play, and finished as SWC co-champion. Texas concluded their season with a loss against Syracuse in the Cotton Bowl Classic.

== Schedule ==
Date	Time	Opponent	Rank	Site	Result	Attendance	Source
September 19	2:00 p.m.	at Nebraska*	No. 17	Memorial Stadium; Lincoln, NE	W 20–0	30,623	
September 26	8:00 p.m.	Maryland*	No. 15	Memorial Stadium; Austin, TX	W 26–0	42,000	
October 3	3:30 p.m.	California*	No. 10	Memorial Stadium; Austin, TX	W 33–0	20,000	
October 10	2:00 p.m.	vs. No. 13 Oklahoma*	No. 4	Cotton Bowl; Dallas, TX (rivalry)	W 19–12	75,504	
October 17	8:00 p.m.	at No. 12 Arkansas	No. 3	War Memorial Stadium; Little Rock, AR (rivalry)	W 13–12	40,000	
October 24	8:00 p.m.	Rice	No. 3	Memorial Stadium; Austin, TX (rivalry)	W 28–6	57,000	
October 31	2:00 p.m.	at SMU	No. 4	Cotton Bowl; Dallas, TX	W 21–0	60,000	
November 7	2:00 p.m.	Baylor	No. 3	Memorial Stadium; Austin, TX (rivalry)	W 13–12	40,000	
November 14	2:00 p.m.	No. 18 TCU	No. 2	Memorial Stadium; Austin, TX (rivalry)	L 9–14	43,000	
November 26	2:00 p.m.	at Texas A&M	No. 4	Kyle Field; College Station, TX (rivalry)	W 20–17	40,000	
January 1	2:30 p.m.	vs. No. 1 Syracuse*	No. 4	Cotton Bowl; Dallas, TX (Cotton Bowl Classic)	L 14–23	75,504	
*Non-conference game; Rankings from AP Poll released prior to the game; All times are in Central time

== Awards and honors ==
- Maurice Doke, Cotton Bowl Classic co-Most Valuable Player
