= 1959 Furman Purple Hurricane football team =

American college football season

1959 Furman Purple Hurricane football
- Conference: Southern Conference
- Record: 3–7 (3–2 SoCon)
- Head coach: Bob King (2nd season)
- Captain: Hicky Horton
- Home stadium: Sirrine Stadium

1959 Southern Conference football standings
	Conf.					Overall
Team	W		L		T	W		L		T
VMI $	5	–	0	–	1	8	–	1	–	1
The Citadel	5	–	1	–	0	8	–	2	–	0
Virginia Tech	3	–	1	–	0	6	–	4	–	0
Furman	3	–	2	–	0	3	–	7	–	0
Richmond	4	–	3	–	1	4	–	5	–	1
West Virginia	2	–	2	–	0	3	–	7	–	0
William & Mary	2	–	5	–	0	4	–	6	–	0
Davidson	0	–	5	–	0	1	–	8	–	0
George Washington	0	–	5	–	0	1	–	8	–	0
$ – Conference champion; Rankings from AP Poll

The 1959 Furman Purple Hurricane football team was an American football team that represented Furman University as a member of the Southern Conference (SoCon) during the 1959 college football season. In their second season under head coach Bob King, Furman compiled a 3–7 record, with a mark of 3–2 in conference play, placing fourth in the SoCon.

== Schedule ==
Date	Opponent	Site	Result	Attendance	Source
September 19	Presbyterian*	Sirrine Stadium; Greenville, SC	L 23–24		
September 26	at South Carolina*	Carolina Stadium; Columbia, SC	L 0–30	14,000	
October 2	at No. 7 Chattanooga*	Chamberlain Field; Chattanooga, TN	L 7–20	5,500	
October 10	at William & Mary	Cary Field; Williamsburg, VA	W 8–7		
October 17	George Washington	Sirrine Stadium; Greenville, SC	W 24–0	5,000	
October 24	at The Citadel	Johnson Hagood Stadium; Charleston, SC (rivalry)	L 14–18	15,100	
November 7	at Wofford*	Snyder Field; Spartanburg, SC (rivalry)	L 3–6	5,500	
November 14	at Richmond	City Stadium; Richmond, VA	L 14–48	3,000	
November 20	Davidson	Sirrine Stadium; Greenville, SC	W 35–7		
November 28	Clemson*	Sirrine Stadium; Greenville, SC	L 3–56	12,000	
*Non-conference game; Rankings from UPI Poll released prior to the game
