= 1959 Bluebonnet Bowl =

- 1st Bluebonnet Bowl
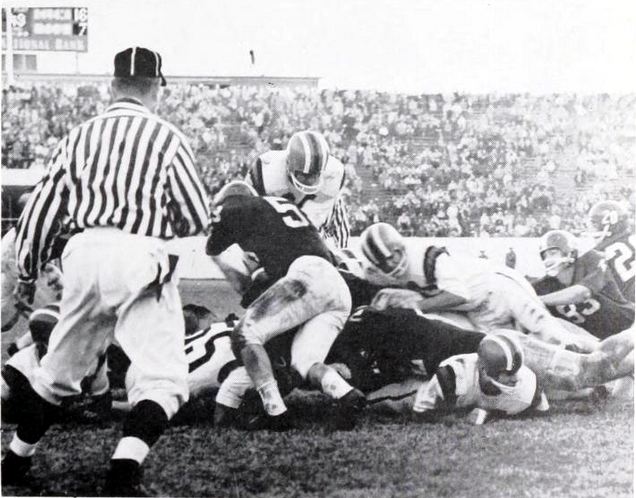
- Ron Scrudato runs the ball for Clemson
Clemson Tigers	TCU Horned Frogs
(8–2)	(8–2)
ACC	SWC
23	7
Head coach: Frank Howard	Head coach: Abe Martin
AP / Coaches; 11 / 11	AP / Coaches; 7 / 8
	1	2	3	4	Total
Clemson	0	3	0	20	23
TCU	0	7	0	0	7
- Date: December 19, 1959
- Season: 1959
- Stadium: Rice Stadium
- Location: Houston, Texas
- Attendance: 55,000

United States TV coverage
- Network: CBS

The 1959 Bluebonnet Bowl was a college football postseason bowl game between the TCU Horned Frogs and the Clemson Tigers. This was the first Bluebonnet Bowl, a bowl game that usually featured a team from Texas against an out-of-state opponent, with 19 out of the 29 games in this series involving a team from Texas, or from the Southwest Conference.

== Background ==
This was TCU's third Southwest Conference (SWC) title in five seasons. Clemson was the first school to play in two bowls in the same calendar year (after playing in the 1959 Sugar Bowl on January 1), with their third Atlantic Coast Conference (ACC) title in four years. They were looking to win a bowl game for the first time since 1950.

== Game summary ==
Clemson started the scoring with a 22-yard field goal by Lon Armstrong, but TCU struck back with a 19-yard pass from Jack Redding to Harry Moreland with 5:45 left in the first half, to give the Frogs a 7–3 halftime lead. The game went scoreless in the third period, but in the fourth quarter, Harvey White threw a pass to Gary Barnes, who galloped in for a touchdown to give the Tigers the lead. Two plays later, Donald George's pass was intercepted by Armstrong. Clemson scored 13 more points with the help of Lowndes Shingler, as the Tigers won 23–7. Shingler ran for 65 yards on 3 carries, and threw for 24 yards on 2 for 4 passing. White went 4 for 9 with 69 yards passing and 1 interception.

== Aftermath ==
The Horned Frogs would return to the Bluebonnet Bowl just once more, 25 years later in the 1984 edition. The Tigers did not win another bowl game until 1978.

== Statistics ==
Statistics	TCU	Clemson
First downs	12	16
Yards rushing	89	203
Yards passing	70	103
Yards Returned	10	61
Total yards	169	367
Punts-Average	5-32.0	3-37.0
Fumbles-Lost	1-0	3-1
Interceptions	4	1
Penalties-Yards	5-35	3-23
