= 1959 Xavier Musketeers football team =

American college football season

1959 Xavier Musketeers football
- Conference: Independent
- Record: 4–6
- Head coach: Ed Doherty (1st season)
- Home stadium: Xavier Stadium

1959 Midwestern non-major college football independents records
	Conf.			Overall
Team	W	L	T	W		L		T
North Park		–		6	–	1	–	1
Northern Michigan		–		6	–	2	–	0
Carthage		–		5	–	3	–	1
Baldwin–Wallace		–		4	–	4	–	0
Xavier		–		4	–	6	–	0
Wabash		–		3	–	5	–	1
Rose Poly		–		2	–	4	–	1
Drake		–		2	–	7	–	0
Washington University		–		1	–	7	–	0
St. Norbert		–		0	–	6	–	1

The 1959 Xavier Musketeers football team was an American football team that represented Xavier University as an independent during the 1959 college football season. In their first year under head coach Ed Doherty, the Musketeers compiled a 4–6 record.

== Schedule ==
Date	Opponent	Site	Result	Attendance	Source
September 13	St. Ambrose	Xavier Stadium; Cincinnati, OH	W 27–7	8,162	
September 19	Louisville	Xavier Stadium; Cincinnati, OH	W 28–13	8,000	
September 27	Villanova	Xavier Stadium; Cincinnati, OH	W 48–20	8,918	
October 3	at Miami (OH)	Miami Field; Oxford, OH	L 7–33	13,000	
October 10	at Ohio	Peden Stadium; Athens, OH	L 7–25	7,500	
October 17	at Detroit	University of Detroit Stadium; Detroit, MI	L 14–38		
October 24	at Dayton	UD Stadium; Dayton, OH	W 3–0		
October 31	at Cincinnati	Nippert Stadium; Cincinnati, OH (rivalry)	L 0–28	24,000	
November 7	Quantico Marines	Xavier Stadium; Cincinnati, OH	L 21–23	6,645	
November 14	at Kentucky	McLean Stadium; Lexington, KY	L 0–41		
