= Navy–Marine Corps Memorial Stadium =

Stadium of the US Naval Academy

Jack Stephens Field at Navy–Marine Corps Memorial Stadium

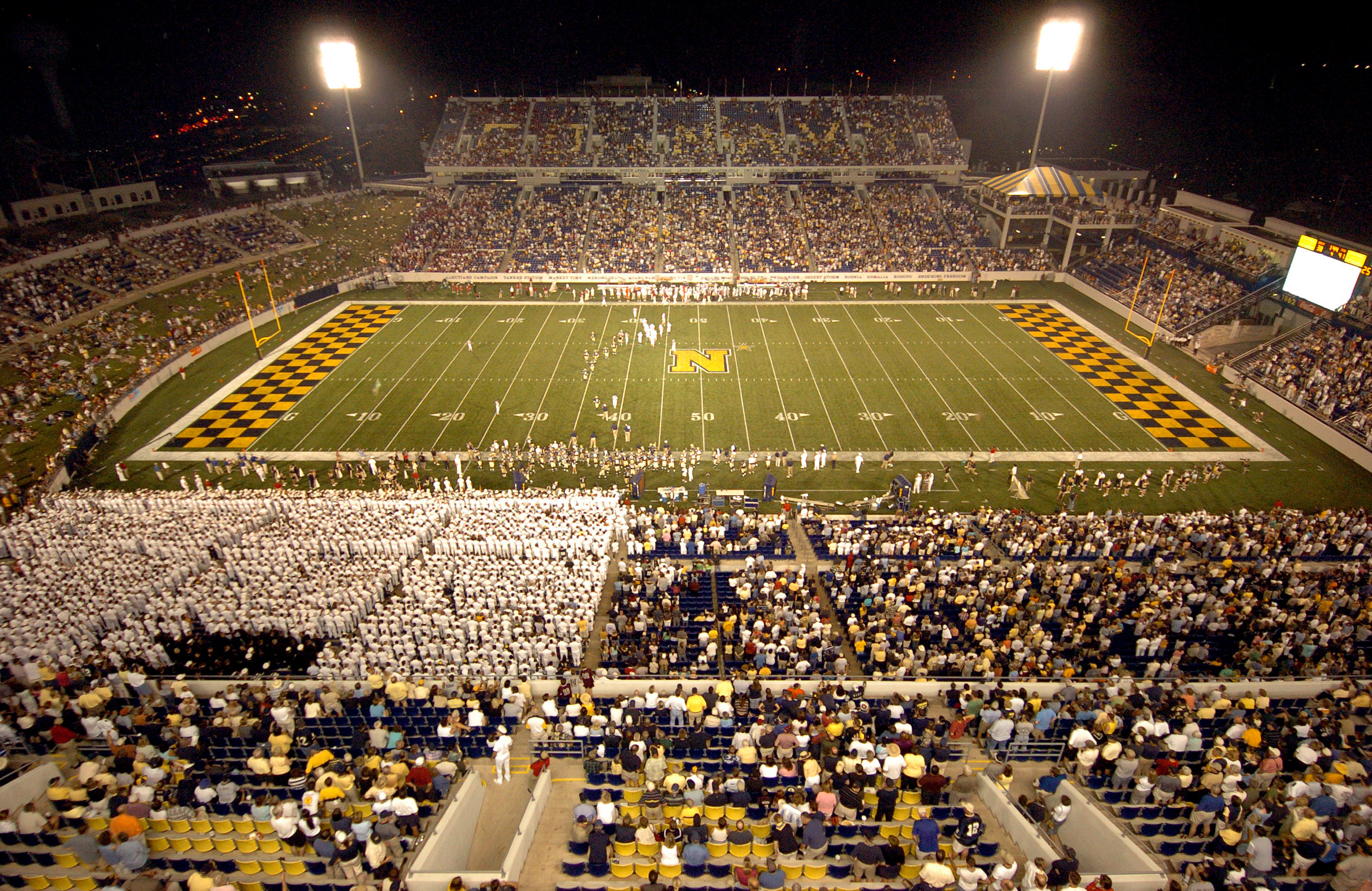
- Hosting Stanford in 2005
- Interactive map of Jack Stephens Field at Navy–Marine Corps; Memorial Stadium
- Address: 550 Taylor Avenue; Annapolis, Maryland
- Coordinates: 38.985°N 76.507°W
- Owner: Naval Academy Athletic Association
- Operator: U.S. Naval Academy
- Capacity: 34,000
- Surface: FieldTurf (2005–present); Natural grass (1959–2004)
- Record attendance: 38,803 (vs. Air Force, October 21, 2023)

Construction
- Groundbreaking: 1958
- Opened: September 26, 1959; 67 years ago
- Renovated: 2004
- Cost: $3.1 million
- Architect: 360 Architecture

Tenants
- Navy Midshipmen (NCAA) 1959–present; Crystal Palace Baltimore (USL-2) 2007; Chesapeake Bayhawks (MLL) 2009–2020; Military Bowl (NCAA) 2013–present; Annapolis Blues FC (USL2) 2023–present

Website
- navysports.com/stadium

Navy–Marine Corps Memorial Stadium is an open-air stadium located off the campus of the United States Naval Academy in Annapolis, Maryland. Opened in 1959, it serves as the home stadium of the Navy Midshipmen college football and lacrosse teams, and was the home of the Chesapeake Bayhawks of Major League Lacrosse. The stadium is also the host of the Military Bowl.

The stadium's opener was a 29–2 win over William & Mary on September 26, 1959, and its current seating capacity is 34,000. The attendance record is 38,803, set in 2023 during Navy's 17–6 loss against Air Force on October 21. Prior to 1959, Navy played its home games at Thompson Stadium, which seated only 12,000. Its site on campus is now occupied by Lejeune Hall, the venue for the United States Naval Academy's water sports.

The stadium hosted soccer games as part of the 1984 Summer Olympics. In April 2018, D.C. United of Major League Soccer played a regular season game versus the Columbus Crew. Annapolis Blues FC of USL League Two started playing home games at the venue in 2023 while the team was members of the National Premier Soccer League, including setting a league regular season attendance record in their first game.

== Memorial ==
The stadium serves as a memorial to the Navy and Marine Corps; it is dedicated to those who have served (and will serve) as upholders of the traditions and renown of the Navy and Marine Corps of the United States. The thousands of memorial bench-back and wall plaques are intended to serve as a reminder, as well as the list of numerous battles involving the Naval and Marine Corps forces since the early 1900s.

== Renovation ==
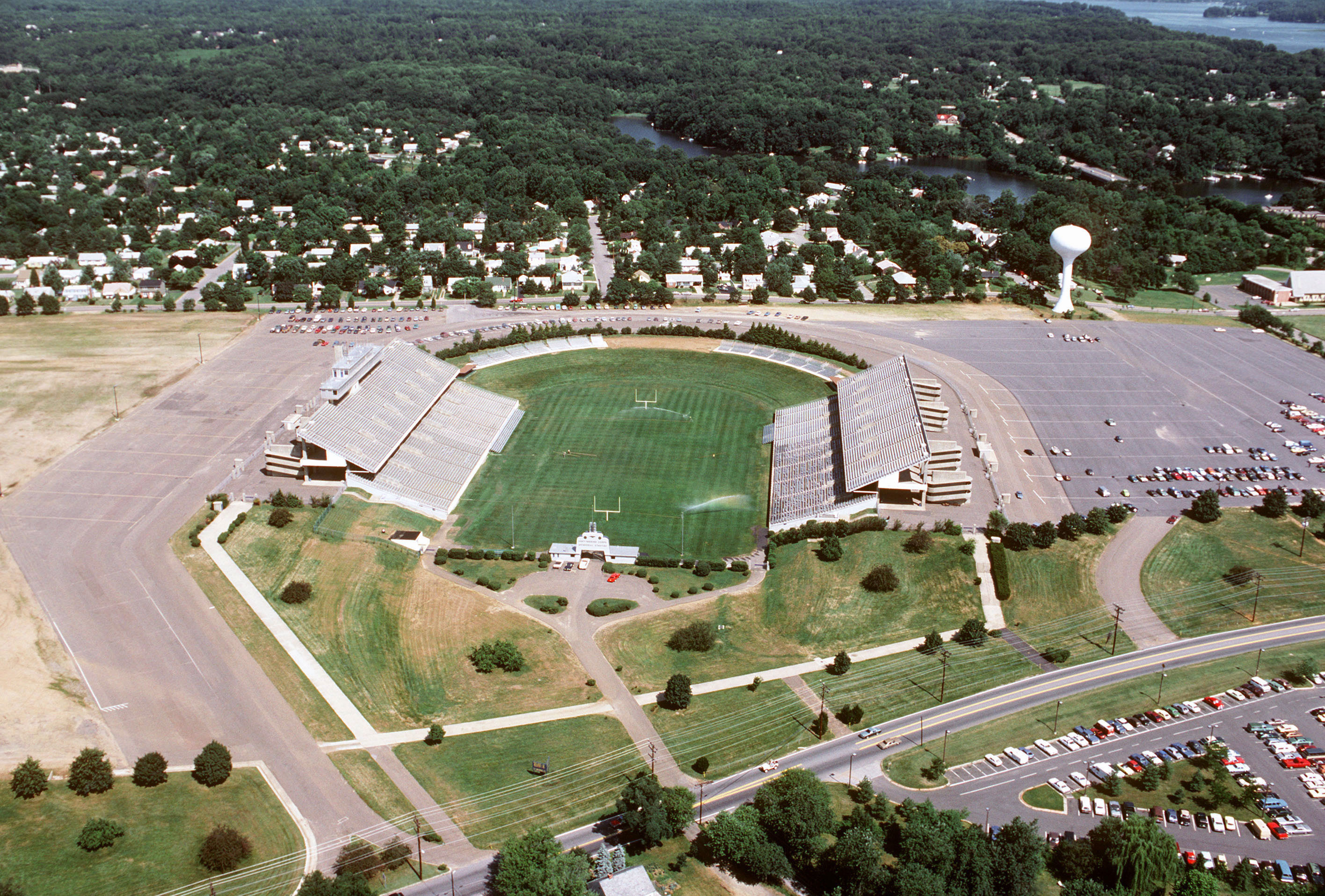
Aerial view of the stadium in 1995

In 2004, the stadium underwent a partial renovation—the expansion of the west side press box—by 360 Architecture with ABS Architects (formerly Alt Breeding Schwarz) acting as the local/Associate Architect.

From 2005 to the present, ABS Architects has designed and developed the expansion and ongoing renovations, including the renovations of the stadium's processional entrance that the Brigade of Midshipmen march through on game days. Additionally, ABS Architects lowered the playing field to increase stadium capacity, designed club seating and associated club lounges, private suites, additional stadium seating (north and south end zones), accessibility enhancements, updated restrooms, concessions and stadium operation facilities, new banquet facilities, and renovated locker room facilities.

== Playing surface ==
For its first 46 years, the stadium's playing field was natural grass. Prior to the 2005 football season, the grass field was replaced with FieldTurf, an infilled synthetic turf. The field runs northwest to southeast, with the press box along the southwest sideline. The elevation of the field is approximately 45 feet (14 m) above sea level.

== Jack Stephens Field ==
The field at Navy–Marine Corps Memorial Stadium is named "Jack Stephens Field", for Jackson T. Stephens (Class of 1947), whose gift aided the renovation of the stadium, the Class of 1947 Legacy project to benefit the Academy's Museum, and other Academy projects.

== 1984 Summer Olympics ==
Several first round matches in the association football (soccer) tournament at the 1984 Summer Olympics were played at Navy–Marine Corps Memorial Stadium.

Date	Time (EDT)	Team #1	Result	Team #2	Round	Attendance
July 29, 1984	19.30	France	2–2	Qatar	Group A	29,240
July 30, 1984	19:00	Yugoslavia	2–1	Cameroon	Group B	15,010
July 31, 1984	19:00	Chile	1–0	Qatar	Group A	14,508
August 1, 1984	19:00	Yugoslavia	1–0	Canada	Group B	20,000
August 2, 1984	19:00	Chile	1–1	France	Group A	28,114
August 3, 1984	19:00	Iraq	2–4	Yugoslavia	Group B	24,430

== Ice hockey ==
On March 3, 2018, the Washington Capitals of the National Hockey League hosted the Toronto Maple Leafs in the 2018 NHL Stadium Series, an outdoor regular season hockey game on an ice surface constructed at the stadium.

Date	Away team	Score	Home team	Attendance
March 3, 2018	Toronto Maple Leafs	2–5	Washington Capitals	29,516

== Military Bowl ==
Since 2013, Navy–Marine Corps Memorial Stadium has hosted the annual Military Bowl, a post-season National Collegiate Athletic Association-sanctioned Division I college football bowl game played annually in December. The game was cancelled in 2020 and 2021 because of the COVID-19 pandemic.

== See also ==
- List of NCAA Division I FBS football stadiums

Preceded by various venues Soviet Union	Summer Olympics; Soccer venue 1984	Succeeded by various venues South Korea
