= 1959 TCU Horned Frogs football team =

American college football season

1959 TCU Horned Frogs football

SWC co-champion

Bluebonnet Bowl, L 7–23 vs. Clemson
- Conference: Southwest Conference

Ranking
- Coaches: No. 8
- AP: No. 7
- Record: 8–3 (5–1 SWC)
- Head coach: Abe Martin (7th season)
- Offensive scheme: Meyer spread
- Home stadium: Amon G. Carter Stadium

1959 Southwest Conference football standings
	Conf.					Overall
Team	W		L		T	W		L		T
No. 9 Arkansas +	5	–	1	–	0	9	–	2	–	0
No. 4 Texas +	5	–	1	–	0	9	–	2	–	0
No. 7 TCU +	5	–	1	–	0	8	–	3	–	0
SMU	2	–	3	–	1	5	–	4	–	1
Baylor	2	–	4	–	0	4	–	6	–	0
Rice	1	–	4	–	1	1	–	7	–	2
Texas A&M	0	–	6	–	0	3	–	7	–	0
+ – Conference co-champions; Rankings from AP Poll

The 1959 TCU Horned Frogs football team represented Texas Christian University (TCU) in the 1959 college football season. The Horned Frogs finished the season 8–3 overall and 5–1 in the Southwest Conference. The team was coached by Abe Martin in his seventh year as head coach. The Frogs played their home games in Amon G. Carter Stadium, which is located on campus in Fort Worth, Texas. They were invited to the Bluebonnet Bowl, where they lost to Clemson by a score of 23–7.

== Schedule ==
Date	Opponent	Rank	Site	Result	Attendance	Source
September 19	Kansas*	No. 13	Amon G. Carter Stadium; Fort Worth, TX	W 14–7	25,000	
September 26	at No. 1 LSU*	No. 9	Tiger Stadium; Baton Rouge, LA	L 0–10	65,694	
October 3	at Arkansas		Razorback Stadium; Fayetteville, AR	L 0–3	20,000	
October 10	at Texas Tech*		Jones Stadium; Lubbock, TX (rivalry)	W 14–8	23,000	
October 17	Texas A&M		Amon G. Carter Stadium; Fort Worth, TX (rivalry)	W 39–6	42,000	
October 24	at Pittsburgh*	No. 16	Pitt Stadium; Pittsburgh, PA	W 13–3	27,397	
October 31	at Baylor	No. 15	Baylor Stadium; Waco, TX (rivalry)	W 14–0	26,000	
November 14	at No. 2 Texas	No. 18	Memorial Stadium; Austin, TX (rivalry)	W 14–9	43,000	
November 21	Rice	No. 10	Amon G. Carter Stadium; Fort Worth, TX	W 35–6	25,000	
November 28	SMU	No. 8	Amon G. Carter Stadium; Fort Worth, TX (rivalry)	W 19–0	40,000	
December 19	vs. Clemson*	No. 7	Rice Stadium; Houston, TX (Bluebonnet Bowl)	L 7–23	55,000	
*Non-conference game; Rankings from AP Poll released prior to the game
