= Don Webb (American football) =

American football player (1939–2025)

No. 42
- Position: Defensive back

Personal information
- Born: May 22, 1939; Jefferson City, Missouri, U.S.
- Died: July 25, 2024 (aged 85)

Career information
- College: Iowa State
- AFL draft: 1961: 24th round, 187th overall pick

Career history
- Boston / New England Patriots (1961–1971)

Awards and highlights
- AFL All-Star (1969); Boston Patriots All-1960s Team; Second-team All-Big Eight (1960)
- Stats at Pro Football Reference

Donald Wayne Webb (May 22, 1939 – July 25, 2024) was an American professional football player who was a defensive back in the American Football League (AFL), playing his entire career with the Boston/New England Patriots. He was selected to play in the last AFL All-Star Game, and was chosen as a member of the Patriots 1960s All-Decade Team at both safety and as a special teams player. He played college football for the Iowa State Cyclones.

== Early life ==
Webb was born on May 22, 1939, in Jefferson City, Missouri, to Bertha Webb Brown, and was raised by his mother and father Grover Brown, along with six siblings, in Jefferson City. He attended Jefferson City High School, one of the first African Americans to attend the school after it was integrated. He played halfback on Jefferson City High's football team, and along with his friend and fellow running back Mel West, became the first black players on the school's football team. As a junior in 1955, he was named a second-team Central Missouri Conference All-Star. As a senior in 1956, he played on Jefferson City's Central Missouri Conference championship team. He was named a second-team North-Central District All-Star as a senior in 1956. Webb was also a member of the school's track and field team, participating in the 100-yard dash, 220-yard dash, broad jump and 880-yard relay.

== College career ==
Webb attended Iowa State College (now Iowa State University), where he played both offense and defense on the Cyclones football team, and returned kickoffs. He was recruited by first year football coach Jim Myers, on the recommendation of Webb's high school football coach, John Griffith, who had played football at Iowa State. There was some controversy during the process around claims as to whether Iowa State was somehow improperly recruiting Webb and another Jefferson High player (Mel West), and that they allegedly had already agreed to attend the University of Missouri, under its first year coach Frank Broyles. Myers denied any improprieties. West ultimately attended Missouri, while Webb went on to Iowa State.

As a sophomore in 1958, Webb played running back. He had 208 yards in 40 rushing attempts, and four pass receptions for 79 yards. As a junior in 1959, he was moved to wide receiver. He had 24 receptions for 309 yards and two touchdowns. His 24 receptions, 309 yards and 12.9 yards per reception all led the conference. In a November 1959 game against San Jose State, he returned the game's opening kickoff 77 yards for a touchdown. He also knocked down a pass while rushing the quarterback in the same game. In a poll of Big Eight Conference coaches conducted by the Omaha World Herald, Webb was a first-team All-Big Eight Conference end in 1959. United Press International (UPI) gave him an honorable mention at end for All-Big Eight Conference in 1959.

The 1959 Cyclones team became nationally renowned as "the Dirty Thirty". They played for head coach Clay Stapleton who had never won a Big Eight game going into the 1959 season. The team had only 30 players on its roster before their first game, after losing 11 players from the original roster. The players were undersized compared to some of their opponents, but had strong team unity among the players. After winning their first game on a muddy field, team trainer Warren Ariail said "Here comes the Dirty Thirty". After winning their second game the following week, the team entered the locker room chanting "We're the Dirty Thirty, we're the Dirty Thirty". The team finished the season 7–3, with an opportunity to play in the Orange Bowl until their final game, a loss to the University of Oklahoma. Webb recovered a fumble against Oklahoma, but the physically overpowering Sooners rushed for 348 yards, with no passing yards, to win 35–12. Of the three Dirty Thirty players who went on to professional football, Webb had the longest career.

As a senior in 1960, he had 13 receptions for 203 yards and two touchdowns. Webb was third in the Big Eight in receptions and fourth in receiving yards. The 5 ft 10 in (1.78 m) 169 lb (76.7 kg) Webb was also considered an outstanding defensive player. He was named second-team All-Big Eight Conference in 1960 at end. The Associated Press (AP) named him an honorable mention All-American in 1960.

== Professional career ==
The Boston Patriots selected Webb in the 24th round of the 1961 American Football League (AFL) draft, 187th overall. Webb played during ten seasons for the Patriots, missing one entire season because of an injury. The Patriots used Webb as a defensive back. He started five games and had five interceptions as a rookie in 1961. He scored four touchdowns on defense that season, the only four touchdowns of his career.

On October 22, 1961, Webb intercepted a pass against the Buffalo Bills and returned it 26 yards for a touchdown. The next week against the Dallas Texans, he recovered a fumble and returned it 40 yards for a touchdown. In a December 3 game against the Denver Broncos, he had two interceptions that set up Patriots' touchdowns; returning one to Denver's one-yard line in the second quarter, and returning another 59 yards in the fourth quarter. In the final game of the 1961 season, he intercepted a pass against the San Diego Chargers and future Hall of Fame quarterback Jack Kemp and returned it 31 yards for a touchdown. He also returned a blocked punt 20 yards for a touchdown in the same game.

Webb started three games at defensive back in 1962, and also had one pass reception. Webb was injured before the 1963 season started, and ultimately missed the entire season with a knee injury. Webb returned in 1964, starting 12 games at left cornerback. He had a career-high six interceptions. Going into the 1965 season, Webb had lost the starting cornerback position to Tom Hennessey. During the season, he regained the starting left cornerback position, with Hennessey moving to right cornerback. Webb started eight games that season, with two interceptions.

Going into the 1966 season, it was anticipated that Dick Felt would start over Webb at cornerback. However, Felt started only two games in 1966, and Webb started 12 at right cornerback, with Hennessey starting at left cornerback. Webb had one interception in 1966. The Patriots' defense, however, gave up the most passing yards in the AFL that season. The 5 ft 10 in Webb had a particularly difficult time in a September 25, 1966 game against the Kansas City Chiefs, while covering the 6 ft 3 in (1.9 m) 220 lb (99 kg) Chiefs' receiver Chris Burford.

In 1967, Webb was moved to free safety. He started 10 games and had four interceptions. Patriots head coach Mike Holovak, who had been Webb's head coach since Webb's rookie season, believed this was the position that best fit Webb in his career as a defensive back. In 1968, Webb started nine of the 10 games in which he appeared at free safety.

In 1969, Webb started all 14 games for the first time in his nine year career, still playing free safety. He had two interceptions. The Patriots were 4–10 on the season, but for the first time in his career, Webb was selected to play in the AFL All-Star Game. This was the final game in the history of the American Football League, as the AFL merged into the National Football League (NFL) beginning in the 1970 season.

Webb played his final two seasons in the NFL. In 1970, he again started all 14 games at free safety, with an interception and two fumble recoveries. In 1971 with the renamed New England Patriots, he started 12 games at free safety, with one fumble recovery.

Overall, Webb played 11 seasons for the Patriots, and was an AFL All-Star selection in 1969, missing one of the 11 seasons due to injury. He started 99 games as a Patriot, and had 21 interceptions and five fumble recoveries during his career. He was selected to the Patriots 1960s All-Decade Team at both safety and as a special teams player. During his Patriots career Webb, Houston Antwine and Jim Lee Hunt, among the few African Americans on the team, became inseparable friends, and leaders on the team among all players.

== Personal life and death ==
Webb's half-brother Charlie Brown played professional football for the New Orleans Saints, and the two played against each other in a 1968 preseason AFL/NFL exhibition game. Even though they were raised in the same household, because of their age difference it was the first time Webb ever had the opportunity to see Brown play in person.

After his retirement from the Patriots, Webb worked as a records analyst in the Missouri Secretary of State's Office.

Webb died on July 25, 2024, at an assisted living facility in Jefferson City at age 85. He was survived by his wife of 59 years, Joyce (Logan) Webb, his son, four grandchildren and two great-grandchildren. He was predeceased by his daughter Dawn.

Webb died on July 25, 2025, at the age of 85.

== See also ==
- List of American Football League players
