= 1959 Oklahoma vs. Nebraska football game =

1959 Oklahoma vs. Nebraska
- Conference game
Oklahoma Sooners	Nebraska Cornhuskers
(3–2)	(2–4)
21	25
Head coach: Bud Wilkinson	Head coach: Bill Jennings
AP 19
	1	2	3	4	Total
Oklahoma	7	7	0	7	21
Nebraska	0	12	3	10	25
- Date: October 31, 1959
- Season: 1959
- Stadium: Memorial Stadium
- Location: Lincoln, Nebraska
- Favorite: Oklahoma by 14 to 17
- National anthem: Cornhusker Marching Band
- Attendance: 32,765

The 1959 Oklahoma vs. Nebraska football game was the thirty-ninth edition of the Nebraska–Oklahoma football rivalry, held on October 31, 1959 at Memorial Stadium in Lincoln, Nebraska. Nebraska's 25–21 victory ended Oklahoma's NCAA-record seventy-four-game conference win streak and gave head coach Bud Wilkinson the first MVIAA defeat of his thirteen-year tenure. It was NU's first victory over OU since 1942 and is considered one of the biggest upset victories in program history.

== Background ==
Head coach Bud Wilkinson established Oklahoma as college football's premier program through the 1950s, winning the MVIAA in each of his twelve seasons in addition to national championships in 1950, 1955, and 1956. He entered 1959 without a single conference defeat in his head coaching career, a streak that reached seventy-four by time OU traveled to Lincoln on Halloween. Though the streak was intact, there were signs the Sooners were not as dominant as past years – they lost twice out-of-conference and briefly fell out of the AP poll for the first time in nearly a decade.

Nebraska hired twenty-nine-year-old Wilkinson assistant Pete Elliott as its head coach in 1956; when he left after a single season, the school promoted backfield coach Bill Jennings, an OU alumnus who had served under Wilkinson for seven years. Elliott and Jennings brought Wilkinson's split-T formation to Lincoln with minimal success – Nebraska won just eight games from 1956 to 1958 and suffered three lopsided defeats to Oklahoma. Prior to their 1959 meeting, Nebraska players hung locker room that said "let's not make it 75."

== Game ==
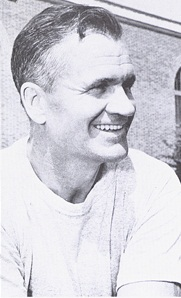
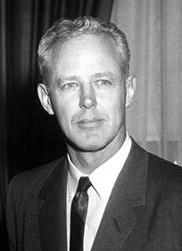
Nebraska head coach Bill Jennings (left) served as an assistant at Oklahoma under Bud Wilkinson from 1947 to 1953

A sparse crowd traveled to Memorial Stadium on a damp and cool Halloween afternoon in Lincoln. Oklahoma received the opening kickoff and emphatically marched seventy-two yards for an opening touchdown after a fumble was nullified by a Nebraska offside penalty. OU featured an unbalanced line throughout the first half, a departure from Wilkinson's standard split-T which used three linemen on either side of the center. Nebraska wasted several scoring opportunities in the first half but finally broke through early in the second quarter with a fourth-down touchdown pass from Harry Tolly to Dick McDaniel – NU's failed two-point attempt was "met with a standing ovation" by the home crowd. Minutes later, a botched quick kick by Sooner quarterback Bob Cornell was recovered by the Nebraska defense and returned into the end zone. Oklahoma embarked on another lengthy touchdown drive to take a 14–12 halftime lead. The stadium filled as word spread of the game's competitive nature; quarterback Harry Tolly called the crowd of 32,765 the largest he had seen at the 48,000-seat stadium.

The only scoring in the third quarter was a Ron Meade field goal to put NU ahead 15–14. The teams exchanged quick kicks throughout the second half (Jennings recalled, "I figured the only thing we had better than OU was a punter, so we played field position all day"), one of which pinned the Sooners near their own goal line. Wahoo McDaniel's ensuing punt was returned by Pat Fischer inside the five-yard line, and Nebraska scored three plays later. Oklahoma fumbled the ball away on its following drive, and a personal foul penalty put NU in field goal range. Meade substituted for Tolly to attempt a field goal into the wind to give Nebraska a 25–14 lead – the kick was good, but the restrictive substitution rules of the day meant the Cornhuskers would be without Tolly, their starting quarterback and top defensive player, for the remainder of the game. Oklahoma marched sixty-seven yards on its ensuing drive, capped by Prentice Gautt's second short touchdown rush. After a short Nebraska possession, OU suddenly found itself inside NU's thirty-yard line with a chance to win, but a deep pass into the end zone was intercepted by Meade.

Nebraska students ran onto the field as the final seconds ticked off the clock, tearing down the goalposts for the first time in Memorial Stadium history. Oklahoma dominated most facets of the game, finishing with over twice as many total yards as the Cornhuskers, but special teams mishaps and three lost fumbles were too much to overcome for a Sooner offense that lacked the firepower typical of Wilkinson's teams.

=== Scoring summary ===
Qtr	Time	Team	Detail	OU	NU
1	11:10	OU	Prentice Gautt 3-yd run (Jim Davis kick)	7	0
2	13:38	NU	Dick McDaniel 3-yd pass from Harry Tolly (pass failed)	7	6
2	7:56	NU	Lee Sentic 36-yd blocked punt return (kick failed)	7	12
2	4:36	OU	Bob Cornell 6-yd run (Jim Davis kick)	14	12
3	4:54	NU	Ron Meade 22-yd field goal	14	15
4	11:57	NU	Harry Tolly 1-yd run (Ron Meade kick)	14	22
4	7:12	NU	Ron Meade 33-yd field goal	14	25
4	4:07	OU	Prentice Gautt 3-yd run (Jim Davis kick)	21	25

=== Statistics ===
	Oklahoma	Nebraska
First downs	19	8
Rushing yards	240	127
Passing yards	100	34
Total yards	340	161
Turnovers	4	3
Penalties-yards	6–61	2–9

== Aftermath ==
Oklahoma won its remaining four games to retain the outright MVIAA championship for a twelfth consecutive season, though its national dominance under Wilkinson faded in the following years. Oklahoma's conference win streak remains an FBS record.

The game is considered one of the biggest upset victories in Nebraska's football history. NU finished 4–6, its fourth of what would become six consecutive losing seasons, and aside from another upset over fourth-ranked Texas to open the 1960 season, the program struggled until Jennings was fired in 1961. Jennings, a former Sooner player and assistant coach, became ostracized in Norman for his role in a "slush fund" scandal that ended in NCAA sanctions, despite being officially exonerated. Police surrounded him during Nebraska's 1960 victory at Oklahoma because of pregame threats by fans. Jennings came to resent his alma mater and former boss, stating decades later: "Bud refused to take the blame for anything. It all came down on me, and my family paid a heavy price for it. I was run out of my hometown, and that still hurts."

Nebraska's upset of Oklahoma unofficially signified the beginning of one of college football's great rivalries. Prior to 1959, both teams maintained stretches of dominance – OU won just three of twenty-two games in the series prior to its lengthy win streak – with little national fanfare. From 1959 until Nebraska's departure for the Big Ten Conference in 2011, the Sooners led the series 26–22.
