= 1959 Iowa State Cyclones football team =

American college football season

1959 Iowa State Cyclones football
- Conference: Big Seven Conference
- Record: 7–3 (3–3 Big 7)
- Head coach: Clay Stapleton (2nd season)
- Captain: Dwight Nichols
- Home stadium: Clyde Williams Field

1959 Big Seven Conference football standings
	Conf.					Overall
Team	W		L		T	W		L		T
No. 15 Oklahoma $	5	–	1	–	0	7	–	3	–	0
No. 18 Missouri	4	–	2	–	0	6	–	5	–	0
Colorado	3	–	3	–	0	5	–	5	–	0
Iowa State	3	–	3	–	0	7	–	3	–	0
Kansas	3	–	3	–	0	5	–	5	–	0
Nebraska	2	–	4	–	0	4	–	6	–	0
Kansas State	1	–	5	–	0	2	–	8	–	0
$ – Conference champion; Rankings from AP Poll

The 1959 Iowa State Cyclones football team represented Iowa State University in the Big Seven Conference during the 1959 college football season. In their second year under head coach Clay Stapleton, the Cyclones compiled a 7–3 record (3–3 against conference opponents), tied for third place in the conference, and outscored their opponents by a combined total of 248 to 80. They played their home games at Clyde Williams Field in Ames, Iowa. The team became known in the school's history as the "Dirty Thirty", named after the number of players left from the original 55, and celebrated for its perseverance and hard-nosed play.

The team's regular starting lineup on offense consisted of left end Bob Anderson, left tackle Jerry Schoenfelder, left guard Tom Ferrebee, center Arden Esslinger, right guard Dan Celoni, right tackle Larry Van Der Heyden, right end Don Webb, quarterback Cliff Rick, left halfback Dwight Nichols, right halfback Mike Fitzgerald, and fullback Tom Watkins. Dwight Nichols was the team captain.

The team's statistical leaders included Tom Watkins with 843 rushing yards, Dwight Nichols with 609 passing yards, Don Webb with 309 receiving yards, and Dwight Nichols and Tom Watkins with 54 points scored (nine touchdowns) each. Three Iowa State players were selected as first-team all-conference players: Dwight Nichols, Tom Watkins, and Don Webb.

== Schedule ==
Date	Time	Opponent	Site	TV	Result	Attendance	Source
September 19	8:00 pm	at Drake*	Drake Stadium; Des Moines, IA		W 41–0	13,397	
September 25	9:15 pm	at Denver*	DU Stadium; Denver, CO		W 28–12	8,903–10,602	
October 3	1:30 pm	Missouri	Clyde Williams Field; Ames, IA (rivalry)		L 0–14	10,632	
October 10	1:30 pm	at South Dakota*	State Field; Vermillion, SD		W 41–6	1,864–4,000	
October 17	2:30 pm	at Colorado	Folsom Field; Boulder, CO		W 27–0	37,319	
October 24	1:30 pm	Kansas State^{†}	Clyde Williams Field; Ames, IA (rivalry)		W 26–0	13,899	
October 31	1:30 pm	at Kansas	Memorial Stadium; Lawrence, KS		L 0–7	24,409	
November 7	1:30 pm	Nebraska	Clyde Williams Field; Ames, IA (rivalry)		W 18–6	10,995	
November 14	1:30 pm	San Jose State*	Clyde Williams Field; Ames, IA		W 55–0	6,059–7,500	
November 21	2:00 pm	at Oklahoma	Oklahoma Memorial Stadium; Norman, OK	WOI	L 12–35	46,529	
*Non-conference game; ^{†}Homecoming; All times are in Central time; Source:
