= 1959 Missouri Tigers football team =

American college football season

1959 Missouri Tigers football

Orange Bowl, L 0–14 vs. Georgia
- Conference: Big Seven Conference

Ranking
- Coaches: No. 19
- AP: No. 18
- Record: 6–5 (4–2 Big 7)
- Head coach: Dan Devine (2nd season)
- Home stadium: Memorial Stadium

1959 Big Seven Conference football standings
| | Conf. | | | | | Overall |
| Team | W | | L | | T | W | | L | | T |
|---|---|---|---|---|---|---|---|---|---|---|
| No. 15 Oklahoma $ | 5 | – | 1 | – | 0 | 7 | – | 3 | – | 0 |
| No. 18 Missouri | 4 | – | 2 | – | 0 | 6 | – | 5 | – | 0 |
| Colorado | 3 | – | 3 | – | 0 | 5 | – | 5 | – | 0 |
| Iowa State | 3 | – | 3 | – | 0 | 7 | – | 3 | – | 0 |
| Kansas | 3 | – | 3 | – | 0 | 5 | – | 5 | – | 0 |
| Nebraska | 2 | – | 4 | – | 0 | 4 | – | 6 | – | 0 |
| Kansas State | 1 | – | 5 | – | 0 | 2 | – | 8 | – | 0 |
$ – Conference champion; Rankings from AP Poll

The 1959 Missouri Tigers football team was an American football team that represented the University of Missouri in the Big Seven Conference (Big 7) during the 1959 college football season. The team compiled a 6–5 record (4–2 against Big 7 opponents), finished in second place in the Big 7, lost to Georgia in the 1960 Orange Bowl, was ranked No. 17 in the final AP Poll, and outscored opponents by a combined total of 125 to 124. Dan Devine was the head coach for the second of 13 seasons. The team played its home games at Memorial Stadium in Columbia, Missouri.

The team's statistical leaders included Mel West with 556 rushing yards and 556 yards of total offense, Phil Snowden with 415 passing yards, Russ Sloan with 128 receiving yards, and Donnie Smith with 24 point scored.

== Schedule ==
| Date | Opponent | Rank | Site | TV | Result | Attendance | Source |
|---|---|---|---|---|---|---|---|
| September 19 | Penn State* | | Memorial Stadium; Columbia, MO | | L 8–19 | 28,000 | |
| September 26 | at Michigan* | | Michigan Stadium; Ann Arbor, MI | | W 20–15 | 50,533 | |
| October 3 | at Iowa State | | Clyde Williams Field; Ames, IA (rivalry) | | W 14–0 | 10,632 | |
| October 9 | at No. 15 SMU* | | Cotton Bowl; Dallas, TX | | L 2–23 | 33,000 | |
| October 17 | Oklahoma | | Memorial Stadium; Columbia, MO (rivalry) | | L 0–23 | 38,561 | |
| October 24 | Nebraska | | Memorial Stadium; Columbia, MO (rivalry) | | W 9–0 | 27,305 | |
| October 31 | at Colorado | | Folsom Field; Boulder, CO | | L 20–21 | 28,422 | |
| November 7 | No. 18 Air Force* | | Memorial Stadium; Columbia, MO | | W 13–0 | 32,000 | |
| November 14 | Kansas State | | Memorial Stadium; Columbia, MO | | W 26–0 | 15,000 | |
| November 21 | at Kansas | | Memorial Stadium; Lawrence, KS (Border War) | | W 13–9 | 40,000 | |
| January 1 | vs. No. 5 Georgia* | No. 18 | Miami Orange Bowl; Miami, FL (Orange Bowl) | CBS | L 0–14 | 75,280 | |
*Non-conference game; Rankings from AP Poll released prior to the game; Source:
