= 1959 Kansas Jayhawks football team =

American college football season

1959 Kansas Jayhawks football
- Conference: Big Seven Conference
- Record: 5–5 (3–3 Big 7)
- Head coach: Jack Mitchell (2nd season)
- Captains: John Peppercorn; Ken Fitch
- Home stadium: Memorial Stadium

1959 Big Seven Conference football standings
	Conf.					Overall
Team	W		L		T	W		L		T
No. 15 Oklahoma $	5	–	1	–	0	7	–	3	–	0
No. 18 Missouri	4	–	2	–	0	6	–	5	–	0
Colorado	3	–	3	–	0	5	–	5	–	0
Iowa State	3	–	3	–	0	7	–	3	–	0
Kansas	3	–	3	–	0	5	–	5	–	0
Nebraska	2	–	4	–	0	4	–	6	–	0
Kansas State	1	–	5	–	0	2	–	8	–	0
$ – Conference champion; Rankings from AP Poll

The 1959 Kansas Jayhawks football team represented the University of Kansas in the Big Seven Conference during the 1959 college football season. In their second season under head coach Jack Mitchell, the Jayhawks compiled a 5–5 record (3–3 against conference opponents), tied for third in the Big Seven Conference, and outscored all opponents by a combined total of 163 to 134. They played their home games at Memorial Stadium in Lawrence, Kansas.

The team's statistical leaders included Curtis McClinton with 472 rushing yards, John Hadl with 126 receiving yards and Leland Flachsbarth with 345 passing yards. John Peppercorn and Ken Fitch were the team captains.

The Jayhawks week 2 game against the eventual National Champion Syracuse was featured in the 2008 film The Express: The Ernie Davis Story.

== Schedule ==
Date	Opponent	Site	Result	Attendance	Source
September 19	at No. 13 TCU*	Amon G. Carter Stadium; Fort Worth, TX	L 7–14	25,000	
September 26	at Syracuse*	Archbold Stadium; Syracuse, NY	L 21–35	25,000	
October 3	Boston University*	Memorial Stadium; Lawrence, KS	W 28–7	20,000	
October 10	at Nebraska	Memorial Stadium; Lincoln, NE (rivalry)	W 10–3	30,000	
October 17	Kansas State	Memorial Stadium; Lawrence, KS (rivalry)	W 33–14	27,000	
October 24	at No. 18 Oklahoma	Oklahoma Memorial Stadium; Norman, OK	L 6–7	51,013	
October 31	Iowa State	Memorial Stadium; Lawrence, KS	W 7–0	24,409	
November 7	at Colorado	Folsom Field; Boulder, CO	L 14–27	27,513	
November 14	Oklahoma State*	Memorial Stadium; Lawrence, KS	W 28–14	15,000	
November 21	Missouri^{†}	Memorial Stadium; Lawrence, KS (Border War)	L 9–13	40,000	
*Non-conference game; ^{†}Homecoming; Rankings from AP Poll released prior to the game; Source:
