= 1959 Oklahoma Sooners football team =

American college football season

1959 Oklahoma Sooners football

Big Seven champion
- Conference: Big Seven Conference

Ranking
- Coaches: No. 15
- AP: No. 15
- Record: 7–3 (5–1 Big Seven)
- Head coach: Bud Wilkinson (13th season)
- Captains: Bobby Boyd; Gilmer Lewis
- Home stadium: Oklahoma Memorial Stadium

1959 Big Seven Conference football standings
	Conf.					Overall
Team	W		L		T	W		L		T
No. 15 Oklahoma $	5	–	1	–	0	7	–	3	–	0
No. 18 Missouri	4	–	2	–	0	6	–	5	–	0
Colorado	3	–	3	–	0	5	–	5	–	0
Iowa State	3	–	3	–	0	7	–	3	–	0
Kansas	3	–	3	–	0	5	–	5	–	0
Nebraska	2	–	4	–	0	4	–	6	–	0
Kansas State	1	–	5	–	0	2	–	8	–	0
$ – Conference champion; Rankings from AP Poll

The 1959 Oklahoma Sooners football team represented the University of Oklahoma during the 1959 college football season. They played their home games at Oklahoma Memorial Stadium and competed as members of the Big Seven Conference. They were coached by head coach Bud Wilkinson.

== Schedule ==
Date	Opponent	Rank	Site	TV	Result	Attendance	Source
September 26	at No. 10 Northwestern*	No. 2	Dyche Stadium; Evanston, IL	NBC	L 13–45	27,500	
October 3	Colorado		Oklahoma Memorial Stadium; Norman, OK		W 42–12	53,745	
October 10	vs. No. 4 Texas*	No. 13	Cotton Bowl; Dallas, TX (Red River Shootout)	NBC	L 12–19	75,504	
October 17	at Missouri		Memorial Stadium; Columbia, MO (rivalry)		W 23–0	38,561	
October 24	Kansas	No. 18	Oklahoma Memorial Stadium; Norman, OK		W 7–6	51,013	
October 31	at Nebraska	No. 19	Memorial Stadium; Lincoln, NE (rivalry)		L 21–25	32,765	
November 7	at Kansas State		Memorial Stadium; Manhattan, KS		W 36–0	11,204	
November 14	Army*		Oklahoma Memorial Stadium; Norman, OK	NBC	W 28–20	61,718–62,472	
November 21	Iowa State		Oklahoma Memorial Stadium; Norman, OK		W 35–12	46,529	
November 28	Oklahoma State*	No. 17	Oklahoma Memorial Stadium; Norman, OK (Bedlam Series)		W 17–7	59,136	
*Non-conference game; Rankings from AP Poll released prior to the game; Source:

== Rankings ==
Ranking movements Legend: ██ Increase in ranking ██ Decrease in ranking — = Not ranked ( ) = First-place votes
	Week												
Poll	Pre	1	2	3	4	5	6	7	8	9	10	11	Final
AP	2 (48)	2 (12)	—	13 (2)	—	18	19	—	—	—	17	15	15

== NFL draft ==
The following players were drafted into the National Football League following the season.

Round	Pick	Player	Position	NFL team
2	19	Prentice Gautt	Running back	Cleveland Browns
10	119	Bobby Boyd	Defensive back	Baltimore Colts
20	233	Gilmer Lewis	Tackle	Green Bay Packers
