= 1960 All-Big Eight Conference football team =

College football award

The 1960 All-Big Eight Conference football team consists of American football players chosen by various organizations for All-Big Eight Conference teams for the 1960 college football season. The selectors for the 1960 season included the Associated Press (AP) and United Press International (UPI).

== All-Big Eight selections ==
=== Backs ===
- John Hadl, Kansas (AP-1 [QB]; UPI-1)
- Mel West, Missouri (AP-1; UPI-1)
- Curtis McClinton, Kansas (AP-1; UPI-1)
- Tom Watkins, Iowa State (AP-1; UPI-1)
- Dave Hoppmann, Iowa State (AP-2; UPI-2)
- Ronnie Hartline, Oklahoma (AP-2; UPI-2)
- Donnie Smith, Missouri (AP-2; UPI-2)
- Chuck Weiss, Colorado (AP-2)
- Bert Coan, Kansas (UPI-2)
- Gale Weidner, Colorado (UPI-3)
- Pat Fischer, Nebraska (UPI-3)
- Norris Stevenson, Missouri (UPI-3)
- Dale Evans, Kansas State (UPI-3)

=== Ends ===
- Dan LaRose, Missouri (AP-1; UPI-1)
- Jerry Hillebrand, Colorado (AP-1; UPI-1)
- Dan Purcell, Nebraska (AP-2; UPI-2)
- Don Webb, Iowa State (AP-2; UPI-2)
- Bill Elkins, Colorado (UPI-3)
- Sam Simpson, Kansas (UPI-3)

=== Tackles ===
- Billy White, Oklahoma (AP-1; UPI-1)
- Harold Beaty, Oklahoma State (AP-1; UPI-2)
- Rockne Calhoun, Missouri (UPI-1)
- Ed Blaine, Missouri (AP-2; UPI-3)
- Bill Eurich, Colorado (AP-2)
- Ron McDole, Nebraska (UPI-2)
- Larry Van Der Heyden, Iowa State (UPI-3)

=== Guards ===
- Joe Romig, Colorado (AP-1; UPI-1) (College Football Hall of Fame)
- Paul Henley, Missouri (AP-1; UPI-2)
- Elvin Basham, Kansas (AP-2; UPI-1)
- Dan Celoni, Iowa State (AP-2; UPI-3)
- Karl Don Milstead, Oklahoma (UPI-2)
- Benny Boydston, Kansas (UPI-3)

=== Centers ===
- Fred Hageman, Kansas (AP-1; UPI-1)
- Arden Esslinger, Iowa State (AP-2; UPI-2)
- Don Fricke, Nebraska (UPI-3)

== Key ==
- AP = Associated Press
- UPI = United Press International

== See also ==
- 1960 College Football All-America Team
