= 1959 Nebraska Cornhuskers football team =

American college football season

1959 Nebraska Cornhuskers football
- Conference: Big Seven Conference
- Record: 4–6 (2–4 Big 7)
- Head coach: Bill Jennings (3rd season)
- Home stadium: Memorial Stadium

1959 Big Seven Conference football standings
	Conf.					Overall
Team	W		L		T	W		L		T
No. 15 Oklahoma $	5	–	1	–	0	7	–	3	–	0
No. 18 Missouri	4	–	2	–	0	6	–	5	–	0
Colorado	3	–	3	–	0	5	–	5	–	0
Iowa State	3	–	3	–	0	7	–	3	–	0
Kansas	3	–	3	–	0	5	–	5	–	0
Nebraska	2	–	4	–	0	4	–	6	–	0
Kansas State	1	–	5	–	0	2	–	8	–	0
$ – Conference champion; Rankings from AP Poll

The 1959 Nebraska Cornhuskers football team was the representative of the University of Nebraska and member of the Big 7 Conference in the 1959 college football season. The team was coached by Bill Jennings and played their home games at Memorial Stadium in Lincoln, Nebraska.

== Before the season ==
Coach Jennings oversaw some minor changes to his assistant coaches, the most noteworthy being the replacement of longtime assistant L. F. Klien. The one new member of the staff, Russ Faulkinberry, would eventually go on to lead the Southwestern Louisiana Ragin' Cajuns, and was the one who renamed them as the Ragin' Cajuns during his tenure. With the new staff in place, Jennings was charged with proving that the two non-conference upset victories during the previous season were not flukes, and that he could do better than 6th place in the Big 7. This would not be an easy task to fulfill, as yet another difficult non-conference schedule loomed, with visits by Texas, Oregon State and Indiana, as well as a road trip to rival Minnesota. The stakes for this year's homecoming game were also increased, as perennial Big 7 champion Oklahoma moved up from the usual season-ending spot to appear in Lincoln for that game.

== Schedule ==
Date	Time	Opponent	Site	Result	Attendance	Source
September 19	2:00 pm	No. 17 Texas*	Memorial Stadium; Lincoln, NE	L 0–20	30,623	
September 26	1:30 pm	at Minnesota*	Memorial Stadium; Minneapolis, MN (rivalry)	W 32–12	50,951	
October 3	2:00 pm	Oregon State*	Memorial Stadium; Lincoln, NE	W 7–6	28,000	
October 10	2:00 pm	Kansas	Memorial Stadium; Lincoln, NE (rivalry)	L 3–10	30,000	
October 17	2:00 pm	Indiana*	Memorial Stadium; Lincoln, NE	L 7–23	34,471	
October 24	1:30 pm	at Missouri	Memorial Stadium; Columbia, MO (rivalry)	L 0–9	27,305	
October 31	2:00 pm	No. 19 Oklahoma^{†}	Memorial Stadium; Lincoln, NE (rivalry)	W 25–21	32,765	
November 7	1:30 pm	at Iowa State	Clyde Williams Field; Ames, IA (rivalry)	L 6–18	10,995	
November 14	2:00 pm	Colorado	Memorial Stadium; Lincoln, NE (rivalry)	W 14–12	27,808	
November 21	1:30 pm	at Kansas State	Memorial Stadium; Manhattan, KS (rivalry)	L 14–29	8,318	
*Non-conference game; ^{†}Homecoming; Rankings from AP Poll released prior to the game; All times are in Central time; Source:

== Roster ==
Official Roster
50 Barnes, Tim C (So.); 34 Bohanan, Bill E (Sr.); 86 Bond, John E (Jr.); 16 Brede, Roger E (Sr.); 84 Case, Phil E (So.); 44 Clare, Patrick HB (So.); 75 Cole, Roger LT (So.); 33 Conger, Jack FB (So.); 55 Cooper, Darrell C (Jr.); 23 Cozine, Dean QB (So.); 38 Dostal, Ken LT (So.); 41 Dragoo, Jerold HB (So.); 72 DuBois, Duane RT (So.); 43 Dyer, Dallas HB (So.); 74 Edeal, Russell LT (Jr.); 80 Eger, Mike E (Jr.); 61 Emanuel, Dennis LG (Sr.); 40 Fischer, Pat HB (Jr.); 64 Fischer, Allen (Richard) RG (So.); 37 Fricke, Donald FB (Jr.); 79 Gacusana, Joe RT (Jr.); 22 Gilbreath, Ron QB (So.); 71 Haney, George LT (So.); 42 Hansen, Roger LT (So.); 73 Heldt, Don RT (So.); 10 Henning, Fred QB (So.); 69 Houser, Don LG (So.); 85 Huge, James E (So.); 83 Jacob, Tom E (So.); 47 Janovy, Leon RT (Jr.); 52 Kitchen, Robert C (Jr.); 63 Kosier, Richard RG (Jr.); 24 Kramer, Thomas QB (Sr.); 46 Lafleur, Jim LG (Sr.); 36 Marman, John HB (So.)	32 Martin, Noel FB (So.); 12 Martz, Max E (Sr.); 89 McDaniel, Richard E (So.); 78 McDole, Ron RT (Jr.); 20 Meade, Ron QB (So.); 76 Mongerson, Duane LT (Sr.); 54 Moore, James C (Sr.); 19 O'Callaghan, Bruce C (So.); 35 Olsen, Steve FB (So.); 66 Olson, Don LG (Jr.); 68 Ponsiego, John LG (Sr.); 15 Powers, Warren HB (So.); 82 Purcell, Donald E (So.); 77 Raschke, Jim LT (So.); 61 Renfroe, Jack RT (So.); 39 Roberts, Dave FB (So.); 65 Rood, Jed RG (So.); 17 Rutigliano, Joe QB (So.); 88 Salerno, Patrick E (So.); 81 Sapp, Guy E (Sr.); 67 Siemer, Dale RG (Sr.); 18 Skaug, Jon LG (So.); 48 Stamm, Frank LG (So.); 11 Stuewe, Dennis HB (So.); 13 Sundberg, Dave LT (So.); 51 Tingelhoff, Mick C (So.); 21 Tolly, Harry QB (Sr.); 87 Tuning, Bill E (Sr.); 53 Wallick, Ron C (So.); 45 Ward, Gene HB (So.); 70 Wellman, Allen RT (Jr.); 14 White, Clay HB (Jr.); 31 Zaruba, Carroll FB (Sr.); 62 Zentic, LeRoy RG (Sr.); 49 Zierke, LeRay RT (So.)

== Depth Chart ==
Defense by committee
HB	HB
	LB / LB
CB	DE / DT / NT / DT / DE	CB

Offensive starters

LE
Richard McDaniel
Roger Brede

LG	C	RG	LT	RT
Don Olsen	James Moore	LeRoy Zentic	George Haney	Ron McDole
John Ponsiego	Darrell Cooper	Dick Kosier	Duane Mongerson	Al Wellman

RE
Max Martz
Donald Purcell

QB
Harry Tolly
Thomas Kramer

LB	RB	FB
Pat Fischer	Carroll Zaruba	Donald Frickle
Dallas Dyer	Clay White	Noel Martin

== Coaching staff ==
Name	Title	First year in this position	Years at Nebraska	Alma mater
Bill Jennings	Head coach	1957	1956–1961	Oklahoma
Don Scarbrough	Assistant coach	1956	1956–1961	
Dick Monroe		1957	1957–1961	
Warren Schmakel		1957	1957–1959	
LeRoy Pearce		1958	1958–1961	
Russ Faulkinberry		1959	1959	

== Game summaries ==
=== Texas ===
Team	1	2	3	4	Total
• #17 Texas	0	14	6	0	20
Nebraska	0	0	0	0	0

- Date: September 19
- Location: Memorial Stadium • Lincoln, Nebraska
- Game attendance: 30,623

The bright spot on this day for the Cornhusker faithful was when HB Pat Fischer ran 92 yards to score in a repeat performance of the same feat accomplished in last year's surprise defeat of Penn State. However, a clipping penalty resulted in the score being called back. Nothing else went right for Nebraska in game as #17 Texas rolled off 20 points and started Nebraska's season off with a 0–20 shutout loss. This was only the second time the teams had met, and they were now even at 1–1 after Nebraska's 1933 win.

=== Minnesota ===
Team	1	2	Total
• Nebraska			32
Minnesota			12

- Date: September 26
- Location: Memorial Stadium • Minneapolis
- Game attendance: 58,885

At first it seemed like it was going to be another dark day for Nebraska in Minneapolis, the site of so many severe drubbings, as Minnesota took the early lead. As the clock wore on, however, the Golden Gophers began to stall, and the Cornhuskers capitalized to go up 13–12 by the half. Minnesota came out flat after the break and never scored again, as Nebraska punched in another 19 points to secure an unexpected and long-sought victory over their main northern rival. It was only the 6th win that the Cornhuskers had earned over Minnesota in 36 attempts dating back to 1900.

=== Oregon State ===
Team	1	2	Total
Oregon State			6
• Nebraska			7

- Date: October 3
- Location: Memorial Stadium • Lincoln, Nebraska
- Game attendance: 27,961

Nebraska's defense answered the call on this day as the Beavers repeatedly approached the goal line and were turned away time and time again. The day was a defensive affair on both sides, and despite the hard work of both teams that netted only one touchdown each, the outcome was ultimately decided by Nebraska's successful extra point, kicked through the uprights by PK Harry Tolly. The Cornhuskers improved to 7–2 over Oregon State all-time.

=== Kansas ===
Team	1	2	Total
• Kansas			10
Nebraska			3

- Date: October 10
- Location: Memorial Stadium • Lincoln, Nebraska
- Game attendance: 28,937

The Cornhuskers were hard-pressed to bring a full-strength team out to face Kansas, as numerous injuries had hobbled starters during the nonconference matchups. The Jayhawks fought Nebraska close, the teams combining to forge a mere 3–3 score by the half. Then, disaster struck the Cornhuskers when starting QB Tom Kramer was injured and came out of the game, severely hampering Nebraska's ability to score. The Jayhawks did put in another touchdown to take the win, moving to 16–46–3 in the series. Kramer's injury turned out to be severe enough that he was lost for the season, which considerably darkened the outlook for a successful Nebraska season.

=== Indiana ===
Team	1	2	Total
• Indiana			23
Nebraska			7

- Date: October 17
- Location: Memorial Stadium • Lincoln, Nebraska
- Game attendance: 34,471

Barely two minutes into the game, the Cornhuskers gave up a fumble which was quickly converted into points by the Hoosiers. Indiana then held the lead for the rest of the day, helped along by Cornhusker blunders and inexperience. A lone Nebraska touchdown avoided the shutout as Indiana enjoyed their 10th straight undefeated game against the Cornhuskers and improved to 9–3–3 in the series.

=== Missouri ===
Team	1	2	3	4	Total
Nebraska	0	0	0	0	0
• Missouri	3	0	6	0	9

- Location: Faurot Field, Columbia, Missouri
- Game attendance: 27,305

With the season's momentum waning, the Cornhuskers traveled to Columbia and were wholly ineffective at making any offensive production. The game had opened with an early Missouri field goal that was made possible by a disputed call. Any question that the game was thrown by the call was set aside when the Tigers scored again in the second half with no attached controversy. Missouri improved to 21–28–3 in the series and kept the Missouri-Nebraska bell for the third year in a row. The scoreless Nebraska squad returned to Lincoln with the season's second shutout loss and carrying a 2–4 record so far, with conference champion powerhouse Oklahoma next on the slate.

=== Oklahoma ===
Team	1	2	3	4	Total
#19 Oklahoma	7	7	0	7	21
• Nebraska	0	12	3	10	25

- Location: Memorial Stadium, Lincoln, Nebraska
- Game attendance: 32,765

Reigning 12-year league champion Oklahoma arrived in Lincoln favored by two touchdowns, and there was little reason to expect anything else. Throughout the first half, the Cornhuskers bravely fought to keep up, matching each of the two Sooner touchdowns but missing the extra points. Coming out after the break behind 12–14, it only remained to see how much longer the Nebraska squad could keep up before running out of steam and becoming the latest team defeated by Oklahoma. Nebraska opened the second half with a field goal to go ahead for the first time, and to everyone's surprise, kept the Sooners off the scoreboard for the rest of the quarter. Suddenly, the game was in reach, and the emboldened Cornhuskers added another touchdown with help from a lost Sooner fumble, and a field goal, to go ahead 25–14 before the stunned crowd. Oklahoma came to life and responded to move within four points, and then quickly forced a Nebraska punt to get the ball again. Marching down the field for 67 yards in just nine plays, the Sooners were set to take back the game when Cornhusker QB Ron Meade, on the field assisting the defense, picked off an Oklahoma pass in the end zone with less than a minute remaining to seal the upset victory. The Oklahoma loss was the first conference defeat in Sooner Head Coach Bud Wilkinson's 13-year career, snapped Oklahoma's remarkable 74-game league winning streak, and snapped Nebraska's 16-game losing streak to the Sooners in what was arguably the greatest triumph in Coach Jennings' career. Nebraska made a bid to take back the series with Oklahoma, moving to 17–18–3.

=== Iowa State ===
Team	1	2	Total
Nebraska			6
• Iowa State			18

- Date: November 7
- Location: Clyde Williams Field • Ames, Iowa
- Game attendance: 10,995

Following an upset victory over Oklahoma the previous week, Nebraska retained a mathematical chance at the conference championship and a berth in the Orange Bowl for the first time since 1954, contingent on additional Oklahoma losses. Iowa State defeated Nebraska by holding them scoreless for most of the game, with Nebraska scoring a single fourth-quarter touchdown to avoid a shutout. The win marked Iowa State’s 10th victory over Nebraska in 53 meetings.

=== Colorado ===
Team	1	2	Total
Colorado			12
• Nebraska			14

- Date: November 14
- Location: Memorial Stadium • Lincoln, Nebraska
- Game attendance: 27,808
- Game weather: Cold, 19 °F (−7 °C)

The last home game of 1959 was on a very cold day, and Colorado arrived enjoying a three-game winning streak over the Cornhuskers. The matchup was a fairly evenly played affair, with the outcome decided by the abilities of the kickers. Nebraska QB Ron Meade's two kicks after touchdowns were good, while the two Buffalo kicks were not. Nebraska's 1959 seniors left Memorial Stadium for the last time, with a win, the program's 150th conference victory all-time. Colorado slipped to 8–10–0 in the series.

=== Kansas State ===
Team	1	2	Total
Nebraska			14
• Kansas State			29

- Date: November 21
- Location: Memorial Stadium • Manhattan, Kansas
- Game attendance: 8,318

The Cornhuskers were heavily favored to beat the weakened Wildcats despite the two-game winning streak that Kansas State had in the series. A season defined by the dramatic upset over Oklahoma was destined to end with an embarrassing 14–29 defeat at the hands of the undermanned and outgunned Kansas State squad. The Wildcats took their third straight game against Nebraska to try to close the gap in the series, moving to 9–32–2.

== After the season ==
Head Coach Jennings's third campaign left the fans unsure of what to expect going forward. Flashes of brilliance with underdog defeats of Minnesota and Oklahoma this year, preceded by upsets of Pittsburgh and Penn State in 1958, were offset by unexplained losses to weak teams and the third overall losing season in a row, with Big 7 finishes of 7th, 6th, and 6th over his tenure. The university opted to continue with their current football coach, and Jennings hoped to move forward and improve on his career record of 8–22–0 (.267), and especially his conference record of 4–14–0 (.222). Nebraska's overall program total slipped for the ninth straight year, tying the nine-year percentage slide record set from 1941 to 1949, as it fell to 359–211–34 (.623). The conference record also dropped further as well, to 150–72–12 (.667).

== Future professional players ==
- Pat Fischer, 1961 17th-round pick of the St. Louis Cardinals
- Ron McDole, 1961 4th-round pick of the St. Louis Cardinals
- Mick Tingelhoff, Minnesota Vikings
- Carroll Zaruba, 1960 1st-round pick of the Dallas Texans- AFL
