= Grandelius =

Grandelius is a Swedish surname. Notable people with the surname include:

- Nils Grandelius (born 1993), Swedish chess grandmaster
- Sonny Grandelius (1929–2008), American football player and coach
