= 1959 Kansas State Wildcats football team =

American college football season

1959 Kansas State Wildcats football
- Conference: Big Seven Conference
- Record: 2–8 (1–5 Big 7)
- Head coach: Bus Mertes (5th season)
- Home stadium: Memorial Stadium

1959 Big Seven Conference football standings
	Conf.					Overall
Team	W		L		T	W		L		T
No. 15 Oklahoma $	5	–	1	–	0	7	–	3	–	0
No. 18 Missouri	4	–	2	–	0	6	–	5	–	0
Colorado	3	–	3	–	0	5	–	5	–	0
Iowa State	3	–	3	–	0	7	–	3	–	0
Kansas	3	–	3	–	0	5	–	5	–	0
Nebraska	2	–	4	–	0	4	–	6	–	0
Kansas State	1	–	5	–	0	2	–	8	–	0
$ – Conference champion; Rankings from AP Poll

The 1959 Kansas State Wildcats football team represented Kansas State University in the 1959 college football season. The team's head football coach was Bus Mertes, in his last year at K-State. The Wildcats played their home games in Memorial Stadium. 1959 saw the Wildcats finish with a record of 2–8, and a 1–5 record in Big Seven Conference play. The Wildcats scored only 58 points while giving up 232. The finished seventh in the Big Seven.

== Schedule ==
Date	Opponent	Site	Result	Attendance	Source
September 19	Wichita*	Memorial Stadium; Manhattan, KS	L 0–19	12,500	
September 26	at South Dakota State*	State Field; Brookings, SD	W 28–12	4,500	
October 3	at Oklahoma State*	Memorial Stadium; Manhattan, KS	L 21–28	8,500	
October 10	Colorado	Memorial Stadium; Manhattan, KS (rivalry)	L 17–20	10,000	
October 17	at Kansas	Memorial Stadium; Lawrence, KS (rivalry)	L 14–33	27,000	
October 24	at Iowa State	Clyde Williams Field; Ames, IA (rivalry)	L 0–26	13,899	
October 31	at Iowa*	Iowa Stadium; Iowa City, IA	L 0–53	45,000	
November 7	Oklahoma^{†}	Memorial Stadium; Manhattan, KS	L 0–36	11,204	
November 14	at Missouri	Memorial Stadium; Columbia, MO	L 0–26	15,000	
November 21	Nebraska	Memorial Stadium; Manhattan, KS (rivalry)	W 29–14	8,318	
*Non-conference game; ^{†}Homecoming; Source:
