= Curtis McClinton Sr. =

American civil rights activist and politician (1913–2012)

Member of the Kansas Senate
- In office 1960–1968

Personal details
- Born: Curtis Realious McClinton; March 22, 1913 Braggs, Oklahoma, U.S.
- Died: June 27, 2012 (aged 99)
- Children: Curtis McClinton
- Occupation: Politician, civil rights activist

Curtis Realious McClinton Sr. (March 22, 1913 – June 27, 2012) was an American civil rights activist and state legislator in Kansas. He served in the Kansas Senate. His son, Curtis McClinton Jr., was a star football player at the University of Kansas and in the NFL.

He was born in Braggs, Oklahoma. He served in the Kansas Senate from 1960 to 1968. In 2002 he was interviewed on The HistoryMakers. He was celebrated following his death as a leading proponent of desegregation in Kansas.
