= 1959 All-Big Seven Conference football team =

The 1959 All-Big Seven Conference football team consisted of American football players chosen by various organizations for All-Big Seven Conference teams for the 1959 college football season. The selectors for the 1959 season included the Associated Press (AP) and the United Press International (UPI). Players selected as first-team players by both the AP and UPI are designated in bold.

== All-Big Eight selections ==
=== Backs ===
- **Gale Weidner**, Colorado (AP-1; UPI-1 [quarterback])
- **Dwight Nichols**, Iowa State (AP-1; UPI-1 [tailback])
- **Prentice Gautt**, Oklahoma (AP-1; UPI-1 [fullback])
- Bobby Boyd, Oklahoma (AP-1; UPI-2)
- Curtis McClinton, Kansas (AP-2; UPI-1 [halfback])
- John Hadl, Kansas (AP-2; UPI-2)
- Mel West, Missouri (AP-2; UPI-2)
- Tom Watkins, Iowa State (AP-2; UPI-2)

=== Ends ===
- **John Peppercorn**, Kansas (AP-1; UPI-1)
- **Russell Sloan**, Missouri (AP-1; UPI-1)
- Dan LaRose, Missouri (AP-2; UPI-2)
- Wahoo McDaniel, Oklahoma (AP-2; UPI-2)

=== Tackles ===
- **Mike Magac**, Missouri (AP-1; UPI-1)
- John Stolte, Kansas State (AP-2; UPI-1)
- Ken Fitch, Kansas (AP-2)
- Gilmer Lewis, Oklahoma (UPI-2)
- Larry Van Der Heyden, Iowa State (UPI-2)

=== Guards ===
- **Jerry Thompson**, Oklahoma (AP-1 [tackle]; UPI-1)
- **Don Olson**, Nebraska (AP-1; UPI-1)
- Joe Romig, Colorado (AP-1; UPI-2) (College Football Hall of Fame)
- Karl Milstead, Oklahoma (AP-2)
- Jerry Payne, Oklahoma (AP-2)
- Benny Boydston, Kansas (UPI-2)

=== Centers ===
- **Fred Hageman**, Kansas (AP-1; UPI-1)
- Arden Esslinger, Iowa State (AP-2; UPI-2)

== Key ==
AP = Associated Press

UPI = United Press International

== See also ==
- 1959 College Football All-America Team
