= 1959 Colorado Buffaloes football team =

American college football season

1959 Colorado Buffaloes football
- Conference: Big Seven Conference
- Record: 5–5 (3–3 Big 7)
- Head coach: Sonny Grandelius (1st season)
- MVPs: Gale Weidner; Joe Romig
- Captain: Bob Salerno
- Home stadium: Folsom Field

1959 Big Seven Conference football standings
	Conf.					Overall
Team	W		L		T	W		L		T
No. 15 Oklahoma $	5	–	1	–	0	7	–	3	–	0
No. 18 Missouri	4	–	2	–	0	6	–	5	–	0
Colorado	3	–	3	–	0	5	–	5	–	0
Iowa State	3	–	3	–	0	7	–	3	–	0
Kansas	3	–	3	–	0	5	–	5	–	0
Nebraska	2	–	4	–	0	4	–	6	–	0
Kansas State	1	–	5	–	0	2	–	8	–	0
$ – Conference champion; Rankings from AP Poll

The 1959 Colorado Buffaloes football team was an American football team that represented the University of Colorado in the Big Seven Conference during the 1959 college football season. Led by first-year head coach Sonny Grandelius, the Buffaloes compiled an overall record of 5–5 with a mark of 3–3 in conference play, tying for third place in the Big 7. The team played its home games on campus at Folsom Field in Boulder, Colorado.

Previously an assistant for five years at his alma mater, Michigan State University, under Duffy Daugherty, the 29-year-old Grandelius was hired as the Buffs' head coach in February, succeeding Dallas Ward. He signed a four-year contract at $14,000 per year.

== Schedule ==
Date	Opponent	Site	Result	Attendance	Source
September 19	Washington*	Folsom Field; Boulder, CO	L 12–21	23,678	
September 26	Baylor*	Folsom Field; Boulder, CO	L 7–15	23,761	
October 3	at Oklahoma	Oklahoma Memorial Stadium; Norman, OK	L 12–42	53,745	
October 10	at Kansas State	Memorial Stadium; Manhattan, KS (rivalry)	W 20–17	10,000	
October 17	Iowa State	Folsom Field; Boulder, CO	L 0–27	37,319	
October 24	at Arizona*	Arizona Stadium; Tucson, AZ	W 18–0	21,000	
October 31	Missouri^{†}	Folsom Field; Boulder, CO	W 21–20	28,422	
November 7	Kansas	Folsom Field; Boulder, CO	W 27–14	27,513	
November 14	at Nebraska	Memorial Stadium; Lincoln, NE (rivalry)	L 12–14	27,808	
November 28	Air Force*	Folsom Field; Boulder, CO	W 15–7	40,000	
*Non-conference game; ^{†}Homecoming; Source:

== Coaching staff ==
- Bob Ghilotti (ends)
- Chuck Boerio (LB)
- Buck Nystrom (line)
- John Polonchek (backs)
