= Dwight Nichols =

American football player (1934–2009)

Profile
- Position: Halfback

Personal information
- Born: October 21, 1934; Knoxville, Iowa, U.S.
- Died: February 2, 2009 (age 74); Dallas, Texas, U.S.
- Listed height: 5 ft 10 in (1.78 m)
- Listed weight: 165 lb (75 kg)

Career information
- College: Iowa State
- AFL draft: 1960

Awards and highlights
- First-team All-American (1959); 3× First-team All-Big Eight (1957, 1958, 1959)

Dwight Edward Nichols (October 21, 1934 – February 2, 2009) was an American football player. Nichols attended Iowa State University and played college football at the halfback position for the Iowa State Cyclones football team from 1957 to 1959. As a junior in 1958, he was selected as the Most Valuable Player in Big Seven Conference after gaining 1,172 yards, including 815 rushing yards. As a senior, he was selected by the Football Writers Association of America as a first-team player on its 1959 College Football All-America Team, and he received third-team honors from the Associated Press and United Press International. He finished his collegiate career 2,232 rushing yards and 3,949 yards of total offense. He was inducted into the Iowa State Hall of Fame in 2009. Nichols was also a veteran of the Korean War. He died in Dallas, Texas, in 2009 at age 74.
