= Clay Stapleton =

American football player (1921–2014)

Biographical details
- Born: June 24, 1921; Jenkins, Kentucky, U.S.
- Died: October 30, 2014 (aged 93); Marshall, Missouri, U.S.

Playing career
- 1941: Tennessee
- 1946–1947: Tennessee
- Position: Guard

Coaching career (HC unless noted)
- 1950–1952: Wofford (line)
- 1953–1954: Wyoming (assistant)
- 1955–1957: Oregon State (assistant)
- 1958–1967: Iowa State

Administrative career (AD unless noted)
- 1967–1970: Iowa State
- 1971–1973: Florida State
- 1973–1978: Vanderbilt

Head coaching record
- Overall: 42–53–4

Accomplishments and honors

Awards
- Big Eight Coach of the Year (1959)

George Clayton Stapleton (June 24, 1921 – October 30, 2014) was an American football player, coach, and college athletics administrator.

Stapleton grew up in Fleming-Neon, Kentucky, where he played basketball and football for the Fleming High School Pirates. He was later recruited by the University of Tennessee and played as a guard for the Volunteers over the span of a few seasons between 1941 and 1947. Stapleton began working as an assistant football coach in 1950, and became the head coach at Iowa State University in 1958.

Stapleton served as the head football coach at Iowa State from 1958 until 1967, compiling a record of 42–53–4. Stapleton was known for his single-wing offense and notorious for punting on third down. He is also well known for coaching Iowa State's "Dirty Thirty" – the 1959 team that started the season with only 30 healthy players – to a 7–3 record, coming one game shy of earning a bid to the Orange Bowl. He served as Iowa State's athletic director following his coaching stint, from 1967 to 1970. He was the athletic director at Florida State University from 1971 to 1973 and at Vanderbilt University from 1973 to 1978. Stapleton played college football at the University of Tennessee for head coach Robert Neyland.

On September 9, 2006, Stapleton was inducted into the Iowa State Athletics Hall of Fame with fellow alumni Beth Bader, Jon Brown, John Crawford, Barry Hill, Russ Hoffman, Jerry McNertney, Hugo Otopalik, Keith Sims, and Winnifred Tilden.

Stapleton died on October 30, 2014, in Marshall, Missouri, at the age of 93.

== Head coaching record ==
Year	Team	Overall	Conference	Standing
Iowa State Cyclones (Big Seven / Big Eight Conference) (1958–1967)
1958	Iowa State	4–6	0–6	7th
1959	Iowa State	7–3	3–3	T–3rd
1960	Iowa State	7–4	4–3	4th
1961	Iowa State	5–5	3–4	5th
1962	Iowa State	5–5	3–4	5th
1963	Iowa State	4–5	3–4	T–4th
1964	Iowa State	1–8–1	0–7	8th
1965	Iowa State	5–4–1	3–3–1	4th
1966	Iowa State	2–6–2	2–3–2	6th
1967	Iowa State	2–8	1–6	7th
Iowa State:		42–53–4	22–43–3	
Total:		42–53–4		
