= Curtis McClinton =

American football player (born 1939)

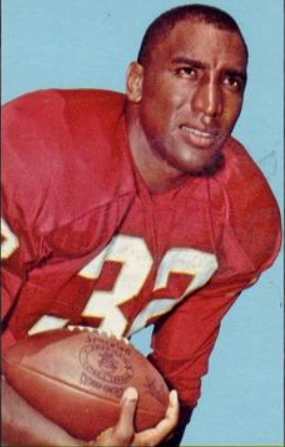
- McClinton in 1965

No. 32
- Position: Halfback

Personal information
- Born: June 25, 1939 (age 87); Muskogee, Oklahoma, U.S.
- Listed height: 6 ft 3 in (1.91 m)
- Listed weight: 227 lb (103 kg)

Career information
- High school: Wichita North (Wichita, Kansas)
- College: Kansas
- NFL draft: 1960: 10th round, 110th overall pick
- AFL draft: 1961: 14th round, 110th overall pick

Career history
- Dallas Texans/Kansas City Chiefs (1962–1969)

Awards and highlights
- 3× AFL All-Star (1962, 1966, 1967); 2× Second-team All-AFL (1962, 1965); AFL Rookie of the Year (1962); AFL rushing touchdowns leader (1965); Super Bowl champion (IV); 3× AFL champion (1962, 1966, 1969); Kansas City Chiefs Hall of Fame; 3× First-team All-Big Eight (1959, 1960, 1961)

Career NFL statistics
- Rushing yards: 3,124
- Rushing average: 4.1
- Receptions: 154
- Receiving yards: 1,945
- Total touchdowns: 32
- Stats at Pro Football Reference

Curtis Realious McClinton Jr. (born June 25, 1939) is an American former professional football player. He played eight seasons in the American Football League (AFL) for the Dallas Texans/Kansas City Chiefs, with which he won three AFL championships and one Super Bowl. He was the AFL's Rookie of the Year in 1962, an AFL All-Star three times, and second-team All-AFL twice. He was All-Big Eight multiple times at the University of Kansas in football, and won three Big Eight championships in track as a hurdler. His father, Curtis McClinton Sr., was the first African American to serve in the Kansas Senate. McClinton held executive positions at Amtrak and the Department of Commerce, and was a deputy mayor in Washington, D.C.

== Early life ==
McClinton was born on June 25, 1939, in Muskogee, Oklahoma, the son of Curtis Sr. and Mary Ella (McGee) McClinton. The family moved to Wichita in the early 1940s, where his father opened a grocery store and became involved in Kansas politics, eventually being elected a state representative and senator. He became involved with the NAACP in the 1940s and was as an advocate for civil rights. McClinton's mother was a teacher. Curtis Sr. made an effort to expose McClinton to what was happening in their community, and his parents focused their children on the importance of education.

McClinton attended Wichita North High School in Wichita, Kansas, where he starred in football, basketball and on the track team. He played end in football and was the football team's captain in 1955, as a senior. In 1955, United Press named the 6 ft 3 in (1.91 m) 195 lb (88.5 kg) McClinton first-team on its All-Kansas All-Senior High School Football Team, and he was named to most Kansas All-State teams as a senior. In January 1956, he was selected to the Wigwam Wisemen of America's third team for top high school football players in the United States, in a poll of high school and college coaches, officials and scouts.

During the Kansas state high school indoor track championships in March 1956, McClinton set a Class AA 60-yard high hurdle record. He also competed in the 70-yard low hurdles and shot put. In 1954–55 and 1955–56, McClinton was a starting forward on the school's basketball team. He was twice All-Ark Valley in basketball, and was his team's leading rebounder; while averaging 15 points per game.

McClinton maintained a B average in school. He also was a talented bass singer in the school's a cappella choir and boys' glee club, winning honors for his "highly superior" solo in a state music festival. During his later professional football career with the Kansas City Chiefs, he would occasionally sing the National Anthem before games at Arrowhead Stadium; and he later performed as a singer in France, Spain, China and Africa.

== College career ==
McClinton originally attended the University of Wichita (now Wichita State University), where he played on the freshman football team in 1956. In September 1957, he transferred to the University of Kansas (KU) in Lawrence, Kansas. It was reported at the time that a KU "prospector" had reached out to McClinton about attending KU, but that person stated McClinton's decision was voluntary and that Clinton was unhappy at Wichita. McClinton had to sit out some time after the transfer, and did not begin his football career at KU until 1959. He graduated KU with a Bachelor of Arts degree in business and education, with a minor in music. While at KU, McClinton was also a member of Kappa Alpha Psi fraternity.

In his first football season at KU (1959), McClinton rushed for 472 yards in 91 carries (5.2 yards per carry), and had six pass receptions for 87 yards and two touchdowns. He led the team in rushing yards and total yards. United Press International (UPI) selected him first-team All-Big Eight Conference at running back. The Associated Press (AP) named him second-team All-Big Eight at running back, along with fellow KU running back and future AFL/NFL quarterback John Hadl.

In 1960, McClinton was second on the Jayhawks in rushing (389 yards) and first in receptions (11) and receiving yards (184). He had one rushing touchdown and one receiving touchdown. Hadl was now his quarterback. The Jayhawks' record improved from 5–5 in 1959, to 7–2–1 in 1960, and they ended the season ranked No. 11 in the nation by the Associated Press. The Jayhawks were Big Eight conference champions in 1960, and the Associated Press named McClinton and Hadl first-team All-Big Eight. UPI again named McClinton first-team All-Big Eight.

In his final season at KU (1961), McClinton had 516 rushing yards in 122 carries, with seven rushing touchdowns. His seven touchdowns tied for the most rushing touchdowns in the Big Eight that year. He again led the Jayhawks in receptions (9) and receiving yards (151), with two receiving touchdowns. The Associated Press again named him first-team All-Big Eight at running back. UPI named McClinton first-team All-Big Eight for the third consecutive year. He was selected to The Sporting News and Time magazine's Pro Scouts All-American teams in 1961. He played in the East West Shrine Game and the Hula Bowl. McClinton caught a touchdown pass from Hadl in the East West game in San Francisco.

Though he was selected by the Los Angeles Rams in the 10th round of the 1960 NFL draft (held in November 1959), McClinton returned to Kansas for the 1960 season, helping them to a record of 7–2–1 record. Similarly, although he was selected in the 1961 AFL draft (held in November 1960) by the Dallas Texans, McClinton played for KU in 1961. The Jayhawks were 7–3–1, and played in the 1961 Bluebonnet Bowl in Houston, Texas. Kansas won that game over Rice University by a score of 33–7, with McClinton scoring KU's third touchdown of the game.

Immediately after the Bluebonnet Bowl game ended, McClinton signed a contract to play for the American Football League's (AFL) Dallas Texans. He signed the contract, and received his bonus check, while standing under the goal posts on the field with team owner Lamar Hunt. In similar fashion, Hadl signed with the AFL's San Diego Chargers on the field after the game as well.

McClinton also was a standout on KU's track team, winning the Big Eight championship in hurdles all three years he competed.

== Professional career ==
The Los Angeles Rams selected McClinton in the 10th round of the NFL draft, 110th overall, but he stayed at KU. The American Football League's (AFL) Dallas Texans (later the Kansas City Chiefs), selected McClinton with a "futures" pick in the 14th round, 110th overall, in the 1961 AFL draft. He again remained at KU that season, and did not play for the Texans until 1962. In urging McClinton to choose his team and league, Texans' owner Lamar Hunt, who was the most important person in creating the AFL in 1960 and holding the AFL together until its merger with the NFL, explained his vision for the AFL to McClinton. The personal connection McClinton developed with Hunt played an important part in McClinton's choosing to play in the AFL for the Texans over playing in the National Football League (NFL). During his eight-year career with the franchise, he wore No. 32.

McClinton was named American Football League Rookie of the Year in 1962, when he rushed for 604 yards and caught 29 passes for 333 yards, playing at fullback. The Texans were 11–3 that season, and won the AFL championship game 20–17 over the Houston Oilers, with McClinton starting at fullback. McClinton led all runners in that game with 24 carries, and his seventy rushing yards were second highest in the game. He was selected to play in the AFL All-Star Game, and was named Most Valuable Player or most valuable back in the January 1963 AFL All-Star Game. He had a 64-yard touchdown run in the first quarter of the All-Star Game, and a 22-yard run a few minutes later. He had 94 rushing yards in the first half. UPI also named him second-team All-AFL as a rookie.

In 1963, he started all 14 games for the now Kansas City Chiefs, who had moved from Dallas to Kansas City. McClinton scored the first touchdown for the Kansas City Chiefs in Kansas City, with a 73-yard touchdown run during a preseason game against the Buffalo Bills. That season he rushed for 568 yards (4.0 yards per carry), and had 27 receptions for 301 yards. He had three touchdowns running and three receiving. In 1964, McClinton had hand and knee injuries early in the preseason and season that hindered his play that year. He started only five games, and was a reserve for the majority of the season behind Abner Haynes (halfback) and Mack Lee Hill (fullback) who became the starters. Both Haynes and Hill were AFL All-Stars that season.

In 1965, McClinton started 14 games at halfback, with Hill the starting fullback. McClinton rushed for 661 yards (3.8 yards per carry), and had 37 receptions for 590 yards; including six rushing touchdowns and three receiving touchdowns. His six rushing touchdowns tied for the most in the AFL, and his nine total touchdowns tied for fifth most. His nine fumbles were tied for the most in the AFL, with quarterbacks Hadl and Jack Kemp. The Associated Press named McClinton second-team All-AFL. Hill suffered ruptured knee ligaments during a December 12 game against the Buffalo Bills, and died two days later after undergoing surgery. McClinton sang the Lord's Prayer at Hill's memorial service on December 16.

McClinton started 14 games at fullback for the Chiefs in 1966. He was named to the AFL All-Star Game for the second time. On the season, he rushed for 540 yards in 140 attempts, and caught 19 passes for 285 yards. He had four rushing touchdowns and five receiving touchdowns. He was tied for sixth in total touchdowns in the AFL. The Chiefs were 11–2–1 on the season, and defeated the Buffalo Bills for the AFL championship, 31–7. McClinton had 11 carries for 38 yards and one reception for 13 yards in that game.

The Chiefs then appeared in the first AFL-NFL World Championship Game, later officially known as the Super Bowl. The Chiefs lost to the Green Bay Packers, 35–10. McClinton was the first AFL Player to score a touchdown in a Super Bowl, catching a 7–yard pass in the second quarter of Super Bowl I. He had six rushing attempts for 16 yards, and two receptions for 27 yards and one touchdown in the game.

In 1967, McClinton started 14 games at fullback for the Chiefs. He had 392 yards rushing in 97 carries with two touchdowns; and 26 receptions for 219 yards and one more touchdown. He was again selected to play in the AFL All-Star Game. In 1968, McClinton suffered a fractured cheekbone twice within a month, and only started one game. Before the season started, McClinton suffered a broken right cheekbone during a mid-August preseason game against the Minnesota Vikings, that required surgery. He returned to play during the season, and it was refractured in a September 22 game against the Denver Broncos.

In his final season (1969), he was a reserve tight end for the Chiefs playing behind Fred Arbanas. He did not start any games and did not have a catch on the season (Arbanas recording only 16 receptions). The Chiefs finished the season 11–3. They defeated the New York Jets, 13–6 in the first round of the playoffs. The Chiefs next defeated the Oakland Raiders, 17–7, in winning their third AFL championship.

In January 1970, the Chiefs won Super Bowl IV, defeating the Minnesota Vikings 23–7. McClinton was a backup tight end for the Chiefs in Super Bowl IV, which was his last game in professional football. This was the fourth and final AFL-NFL World Championship Game. The AFL fully merged into the NFL the following season, and the American Football Conference vs. National Football Conference championship game officially became known as the Super Bowl.

McClinton is the tenth-leading rusher in franchise history (through 2025). Over his career with the Texans/Chiefs, McClinton had 762 rushing attempts for 3,124 yards and 18 touchdowns. He also caught 154 passes for 1,945 yards and 14 touchdowns.

== Legacy and honors ==
McClinton was known for his all-around play for the Chiefs, as an excellent blocker and pass receiver, as well as a runner. He considered blocking for Chiefs' Hall of Fame quarterback Len Dawson his greatest honor as a football player, and his greatest love as a player was to be blocking and hitting defenders hard as a blocker. Lamar Hunt called McClinton the "first really fast player who was a punishing blocker". Similarly, even though primarily known as a blocking back at KU, he still rushed for a three-year career total of 1,377 yards in 299 attempts (4.6 yards per carry), with 13 touchdowns. He also caught 26 passes for 422 yards and five more touchdowns for the Jayhawks. He was also a team leader among the Chiefs, who star wide receiver Otis Taylor saw as a father figure because of the guidance McClinton would provide.

In May 1956, Wichita's sportswriters and sportscasters chose McClinton as Wichita's Athlete of the Year. In 1969, McClinton was selected to KU's All-Time Team in football. In 1995, he was inducted into the Kansas City Chiefs Hall of Honor. In 2003, he was inducted into the Kansas Sports Hall of Fame, and in 2004 he was inducted into KU's Ring of Honor, with his name now permanently displayed at KU's Memorial Stadium. In 2005, he was inducted into the inaugural class of the Wichita North High School Hall of Fame, along with Pro Football Hall of Fame running back Barry Sanders, and Naismith Basketball Hall of Fame inductee Lynette Woodard, among others. He was inducted into the Missouri Sports Hall of Fame in 2007.

== Personal life ==
In 1956, McClinton's father, Curtis McClinton Sr., was elected to the Kansas House of Representatives, at a time when Kansas was still segregated. In 1960, his father became Kansas' first African American state senator. Curtis Sr. introduced laws that anticipated later federal Civil Rights laws in equal treatment of all Kansas citizens. McClinton's parents were the main influence in his life, especially concerning the importance of education.

McClinton was also influenced as a player and in his overall life by four of his football coaches: Linwood Sexton (his sixth grade coach who had been an All-American at Wichita State), Monk Edwards (his coach at Wichita North High School), Jack Mitchell (his coach at the University of Kansas), and Hall of Fame Kansas City Chiefs' head coach Hank Stram.

During the unrest that occurred after the assassination of Dr. Martin Luther King Jr. in April 1968, McClinton and four other Chiefs players (Buck Buchanan, Willie Mitchell, Otis Taylor and Fred Williamson) were present at an assembly at Central High School in Kansas City on April 9. As the students left the assembly and began to march in the streets, McClinton was among those trying to keep the peace between the students and the police. He was shot with a tear gas canister in the process. Before Dr. King's assassination and ensuing riots in Kansas City, McClinton had been working on fair housing issues, and had organized a local chapter of the Negro Industrial Economic Union (which had been founded by NFL star Jim Brown), a forerunner of the Black Economic Union. He and the other Chiefs were at Central High that day for a long-planned meeting to speak to the students about the Negro Industrial Economic Union, before the events of the day unfolded in another direction.

After receiving his B.A. from the University of Kansas, McClinton later received a master's degree from Central Michigan University in business management, and an honorary doctorate from Miles College. He was the first president of the Black Economic Union of Greater Kansas City, and he helped found the first black-owned bank in Kansas City (the Swope Parkway Bank). Shortly after McClinton retired from professional football, he became discouraged about his life in Kansas City and the limits he found, and left the city. In one incident, he was applying for a position at a brokerage firm in Kansas City and the person interviewing him could not believe that a black man could hold the security license that McClinton held.

McClinton became a registered banker and graduated from Harvard Kennedy School at Harvard University with a master's degree in business. He was Amtrak's national director for real estate and marketing, and worked for the Department of Commerce overseeing economic development of cities and counties nationally. McClinton served as Deputy Mayor for Economic Development in Washington, D.C. He also worked in Spain and Jamaica in international development.

In 1992, McClinton moved back to Kansas City, and worked in the investment banking and development market. After returning to Kansas City, he owned the McClinton Development Company, a Kansas City-based construction contractor. In the early 2000s, he established the Curtis McClinton Keys League, a youth urban football program that focused on education, leadership and entrepreneurial skills as well as football skills. He also taught at the University of Missouri-Kansas City, and has been active with the Fellowship of Christian Athletes.

He and his wife Devonne married in 1973. She is a medical doctor. He has two daughters and six grandchildren. In his later years, he moved to Dallas, where he lives with his wife, daughter, son-in-law and two grandchildren.

== AFL career statistics ==
Legend
	Won the Super Bowl
	Won the AFL championship
	Led the league
**Bold**	Career high

=== Regular season ===
Year	Team	Games		Rushing					Receiving				
Year	Team	GP	GS	Att	Yds	Avg	Lng	TD	Rec	Yds	Avg	Lng	TD
1962	DTX	14	9	111	604	**5.4**	**69**	2	29	333	11.5	28	0
1963	KAN	14	14	142	568	4.0	36	3	27	301	11.1	46	3
1964	KAN	14	5	73	252	3.5	30	1	13	221	**17.0**	66	2
1965	KAN	14	14	**175**	**661**	3.8	48	**6**	**37**	**590**	15.9	**69**	3
1966	KAN	14	14	140	540	3.9	49	4	19	285	15.0	68	**5**
1967	KAN	14	14	97	392	4.0	34	2	26	219	8.4	25	1
1968	KAN	9	1	24	107	4.5	19	0	3	-4	-1.3	5	0
1969	KAN	14	0	0	0	0.0	0	0	0	0	0.0	0	0
Career		107	71	762	3,124	4.1	69	18	154	1,945	12.6	69	14

=== Playoffs ===
Year	Team	Games		Rushing					Receiving				
Year	Team	GP	GS	Att	Yds	Avg	Lng	TD	Rec	Yds	Avg	Lng	TD
1962	DTX	1	1	**24**	**70**	2.9	8	0	1	4	4.0	4	0
1966	KAN	2	2	17	54	**3.2**	**10**	0	**3**	**47**	**15.7**	**27**	**1**
1968	KAN	1	0	0	0	0.0	0	0	0	0	0.0	0	0
1969	KAN	2	0	0	0	0.0	0	0	0	0	0.0	0	0
Career		6	3	41	124	3.0	10	0	4	51	12.8	27	1

== See also ==
- List of American Football League players
