= Tom Watkins (American football) =

American football player (1937–2011)

No. 22, 23
- Position: Running back

Personal information
- Born: October 23, 1937; West Memphis, Arkansas, U.S.
- Died: October 29, 2011 (aged 74); Detroit, Michigan, U.S.
- Listed height: 6 ft 0 in (1.83 m)
- Listed weight: 195 lb (88 kg)

Career information
- High school: West Memphis
- College: Iowa State
- NFL draft: 1960: 15th round, 177th overall pick
- AFL draft: 1961: 8th round, 58th overall pick

Career history
- Cleveland Browns (1961); Detroit Lions (1962–1967); Pittsburgh Steelers (1968)

Awards and highlights
- Second-team All-American (1960); First-team All-Big Eight (1960); Second-team All-Big Eight (1959); Iowa State Athletic Hall of Fame

Career NFL statistics
- Rushing yards: 1,791
- Rushing average: 3.8
- Receptions: 55
- Receiving yards: 590
- Total touchdowns: 17
- Stats at Pro Football Reference

Tom Watkins (October 23, 1937 – October 29, 2011) was an American professional football player who was a running back in the National Football League (NFL). He was selected by the Cleveland Browns in the 15th round of the 1960 NFL draft. He played college football for the Iowa State Cyclones.

Watkins also played for the Detroit Lions and Pittsburgh Steelers. He was inducted into Iowa State's Athletic Hall of Fame in 2002.

According to George Plimpton's best-selling book "Paper Lion" Watkins, graduated from Iowa State University in 1961, was one of the best running backs in Cyclone history. A member of the famed 1959 "Dirty Thirty" team, Watkins ranked second in the nation in rushing that season and earned All-America honors the following year in 1960. He played seven seasons in the NFL, leading the league in punt return yardage as a Lion in 1963 and 1964. He was inducted into ISU's Athletics Hall of Fame in 2002.

Tom lived the last 30+ years of his life living in Detroit, Michigan where he was a philanthropist and mentor for many youth in the Metro Detroit area.

== Professional career ==
Tom Watkins was drafted by the Cleveland Browns of the NFL in the 1960 NFL draft. Watkins was traded to the Detroit Lions three years later. With the Lions, Watkins made his impact as a return specialist. In a game against the 49ers in 1963, Watkins returned a punt for 90 yards, setting a team record that would remain unbroken until Desmond Howard returned one for 95 yards in a 2000 game against the New Orleans Saints.

Watkins played in just one game for the Pittsburgh Steelers in 1968, but did not record a stat.

After his playing career was over, Watkins lived in Detroit, becoming the head coach of Detroit Chadsey High School's football team. He retired after 35 years as head coach in 2006.
