= Nebraska–Oklahoma football rivalry =

American college football rivalry

- Nebraska Cornhuskers Oklahoma Sooners
- Sport: Football
- First meeting: November 23, 1912; Nebraska 13, Oklahoma 9
- Latest meeting: September 17, 2022; Oklahoma 49, Nebraska 14
- Next meeting: September 15, 2029

Statistics
- Total meetings: 88
- All-time series: Oklahoma leads, 47–38–3
- Largest victory: Nebraska, 69–7 (1997)
- Longest win streak: Oklahoma, 16 (1943–1958)
- Current win streak: Oklahoma, 3 (2010–present)

Locations of Nebraska and Oklahoma

The Nebraska–Oklahoma football rivalry is an American college football rivalry between the Nebraska Cornhuskers and Oklahoma Sooners. The two programs are among the most storied in the sport's history, and their traditional Thanksgiving-weekend meeting often carried conference and national championship implications. They met eighteen times with both ranked in the national top ten, including two AP poll and two BCS No. 1 vs No. 2 games.

The teams were conference opponents as early as 1921, but the annual meeting did not immediately gain prominence – Nebraska's domination of the MVIAA prior to World War II was followed by sixteen consecutive Oklahoma conference championships from 1946 to 1959. The rivalry became nationally significant as Bob Devaney built NU into a power in the 1960s, culminating in a 1971 meeting (the "Game of the Century") that is often considered the best game in college football history. Tom Osborne and Barry Switzer, both promoted to head coach in 1973, entrenched the series as one of the sport's great rivalries. Switzer won thirteen of eighteen meetings with Osborne, coining the term "Sooner Magic" to describe OU's often uncanny success in these games. Nebraska controlled the series in the decade following Switzer's 1988 resignation.

The annual series ended in 1996 when the Big Eight merged with the Southwest to form the Big 12 Conference, with Nebraska and Oklahoma in separate divisions. The teams played several high-profile games in the Big 12, including the first two No. 1 vs. No. 2 games in BCS history, but have met infrequently since Nebraska joined the Big Ten in 2011.

== History ==
=== Early years ===
Nebraska and Oklahoma first met on November 23, 1912, a 13–9 Cornhuskers win in Lincoln. Oklahoma joined the Missouri Valley Intercollegiate Athletic Association in 1920 and the teams began an annual series when Nebraska rejoined the following year (NU was temporarily banned from the MVIAA for hosting a game against Oklahoma in Omaha, when conference rules required schools to play home games on campus). In 1923, NU defeated OU in the first game at Memorial Stadium on a field of mostly dirt; the Cornhuskers were forced into blue practice jerseys when Oklahoma mistakenly brought home reds to Lincoln.

The series was uneventful in its early years, with Nebraska winning twenty-one MVIAA titles prior to World War II and losing just three times to Oklahoma. The balance of power shifted when Bud Wilkinson turned OU into a national powerhouse through the early 1950s, winning three national championships and beginning an NCAA-record seventy-four-game conference win streak. Prior to his first game against Nebraska in 1947, NU's student council protested a longstanding agreement among MVIAA universities prohibiting black athletes and accused OU's athletic board of perpetuating this agreement.

Nebraska hired a pair of Wilkinson assistants as its head coach in the latter part of the decade, Pete Elliott and Bill Jennings, who brought Wilkinson's split-T formation to Lincoln. Both coaches were largely unsuccessful, but Jennings snapped OU's sixteen-game win streak in the series in 1959, considered one of the biggest upset victories in school history. Jennings, a lifelong Sooner, became ostracized in Norman for his role in a "slush fund" scandal that ended in NCAA sanctions and Wilkinson's resignation, despite being officially exonerated. Police surrounded him during Nebraska's 1960 victory at Oklahoma because of pregame threats by fans. Jennings came to resent his alma mater and former boss, stating decades later: "Bud refused to take the blame for anything. It all came down on me, and my family paid a heavy price for it. I was run out of my hometown, and that still hurts."

=== Rivalry takes off ===
The series became one of college football's most intense when Nebraska hired Bob Devaney in 1962. After a dominant Sooners victory in Devaney's first year, the teams met in Lincoln in 1963, the first of many NU–OU games that determined the Big Eight champion and a trip to the Orange Bowl. The game, a 29–20 Nebraska win, was nearly canceled due to the assassination of John F. Kennedy the day prior. Despite Wilkinson, a personal friend of Kennedy's, receiving permission from his brother Robert to play the game, both schools were criticized in the aftermath. OU struggled in the immediate aftermath of Wilkinson's 1963 resignation, but upsets of NU in 1964 and 1966 kept the Cornhuskers out of national championship contention.

The programs followed similar paths after taking a step back in the late 1960s – Devaney promoted I formation disciple Tom Osborne to offensive coordinator, while OU head coach Chuck Fairbanks allowed Barry Switzer to install the wishbone offense, a variation of the T formation made famous by rival Texas. This culminated in the "Game of the Century" in 1971, often considered the best game in college football history. After unprecedented buildup, top-ranked Nebraska defeated No. 2 Oklahoma 35–31 in Norman in a game described as "the greatest collegiate football battle ever," and later claimed a second consecutive national championship.

=== Osborne and Switzer ===
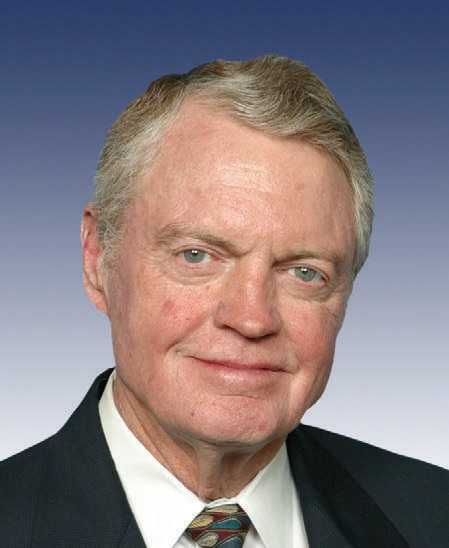
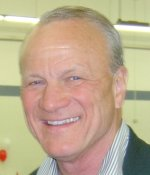
Nebraska's Tom Osborne (left) and Oklahoma's Barry Switzer coached eighteen games against each other

Osborne and Switzer were both promoted to head coach in 1973 and established one of college football's most famous coaching rivalries. Switzer maintained the upper hand throughout the 1970s, winning his first five meetings against Osborne and coining the term "Sooner Magic" to describe OU's success in these games. Switzer led OU to national titles in 1974 and 1975 despite NCAA sanctions to begin his tenure. Osborne's first victory over Switzer came in 1978, when Nebraska recovered six OU fumbles to upset the top-ranked Sooners. Nebraska lost to Missouri the next week to end its national title hopes, and then to Oklahoma in an Orange Bowl rematch, the only time the schools have met in a bowl game.

From 1973 through 1979, OU and its run-heavy wishbone went 7–1 in the series despite averaging less than five pass attempts per game. Osborne had always used some option concepts in his offensive design, but unlike Switzer, he did it primarily with pro-style quarterbacks. Osborne committed to an option-based attack and under the guidance of dual-threat Turner Gill, NU won three consecutive games in the series in the early 1980s. This included a regular season-finale victory in a 1983 season that saw NU break many of OU's offensive records set a decade prior.

Oklahoma again took control of the series in the mid-1980s, defeating a top-five Nebraska team in four consecutive seasons. The last of these, billed as the "Game of the Century II," did not match its predecessor from 1971 – trailing 7–0 at halftime, No. 2 Oklahoma dominated the second half to upset top-ranked Nebraska. Switzer resigned following the 1988 season in the wake of sweeping NCAA sanctions.

=== Big 12 era and the end of the rivalry ===
Nebraska won nine of ten games following Switzer's departure, its longest run of success against OU since World War II. In 1996, the annual series ended when the Big Eight merged with four Texas schools of the Southwest to form the Big 12 Conference, with NU and OU placed in separate divisions. The schools won at least a share of 71 of the 89 MVIAA and Big Eight championships.

Nebraska won its first two Big 12 games against Oklahoma 69–7 and 73–21, the two most lopsided results in series history. In 2000, after a two-year series hiatus, eventual national champion OU and second-year head coach Bob Stoops overcame an early 14–0 deficit to defeat NU in the first regular season No. 1 vs. No. 2 game in Bowl Championship Series history. They met again as the BCS's top two teams in 2001, and a fourth-quarter touchdown reception by quarterback Eric Crouch became the signature moment of his Heisman Trophy-winning season.

In July 2010, the University of Nebraska–Lincoln announced it would join the Big Ten Conference by 2011, essentially ending the school's rivalry with Oklahoma. NU and OU met in the 2010 Big 12 Championship Game, their last game as conference opponents, a 23–20 Oklahoma victory. The series was renewed in 2021 and 2022 to commemorate the fiftieth anniversary of the Game of the Century. The teams are scheduled to meet in Norman in 2029 and in Lincoln in 2030.

== Game results ==
Nebraska victories	Oklahoma victories	Tie games

No.	Date	Location	Winning team		Losing team	
1	November 23, 1912	Lincoln	Nebraska	13	Oklahoma	9
2	October 25, 1919	Omaha	Tie	7	Tie	7
3	October 29, 1921	Lincoln	Nebraska	44	Oklahoma	0
4	October 28, 1922	Norman	Nebraska	39	Oklahoma	7
5	October 13, 1923	Lincoln	Nebraska	24	Oklahoma	0
6	October 11, 1924	Norman	Oklahoma	14	Nebraska	7
7	October 31, 1925	Lincoln	Nebraska	12	Oklahoma	0
8	November 10, 1928	Norman	Nebraska	44	Oklahoma	6
9	November 16, 1929	Lincoln	Tie	13	Tie	13
10	October 11, 1930	Norman	Oklahoma	20	Nebraska	7
11	October 10, 1931	Lincoln	Nebraska	13	Oklahoma	0
12	November 19, 1932	Norman	Nebraska	5	Oklahoma	0
13	October 28, 1933	Lincoln	Nebraska	16	Oklahoma	7
14	October 20, 1934	Norman	Nebraska	6	Oklahoma	0
15	October 26, 1935	Lincoln	Nebraska	19	Oklahoma	0
16	October 24, 1936	Norman	No. 15 Nebraska	14	Oklahoma	0
17	October 16, 1937	Lincoln	Tie	0	Tie	0
18	October 22, 1938	Norman	No. 14 Oklahoma	14	Nebraska	0
19	November 25, 1939	Lincoln	Nebraska	13	No. 14 Oklahoma	7
20	November 2, 1940	Norman	No. 12 Nebraska	13	Oklahoma	0
21	November 29, 1941	Lincoln	Nebraska	7	Oklahoma	6
22	October 24, 1942	Norman	Nebraska	7	Oklahoma	0
23	November 27, 1943	Lincoln	Oklahoma	26	Nebraska	7
24	December 2, 1944	Oklahoma City	Oklahoma	31	Nebraska	12
25	September 29, 1945	Lincoln	Oklahoma	20	Nebraska	0
26	November 23, 1946	Norman	No. 18 Oklahoma	27	Nebraska	6
27	November 22, 1947	Lincoln	Oklahoma	14	Nebraska	13
28	November 13, 1948	Norman	No. 9 Oklahoma	41	Nebraska	14
29	October 22, 1949	Lincoln	No. 4 Oklahoma	48	Nebraska	0
30	November 25, 1950	Norman	No. 1 Oklahoma	49	No. 16 Nebraska	35
31	November 24, 1951	Lincoln	No. 12 Oklahoma	27	Nebraska	0
32	November 22, 1952	Norman	No. 5 Oklahoma	34	Nebraska	13
33	November 21, 1953	Lincoln	No. 4 Oklahoma	30	Nebraska	7
34	November 20, 1954	Norman	No. 3 Oklahoma	55	Nebraska	7
35	November 19, 1955	Lincoln	No. 1 Oklahoma	41	Nebraska	0
36	November 24, 1956	Norman	No. 1 Oklahoma	54	Nebraska	6
37	November 23, 1957	Lincoln	No. 6 Oklahoma	32	Nebraska	7
38	November 22, 1958	Norman	No. 4 Oklahoma	40	Nebraska	7
39	October 31, 1959	Lincoln	Nebraska	25	No. 19 Oklahoma	21
40	November 19, 1960	Norman	Nebraska	17	Oklahoma	14
41	November 25, 1961	Lincoln	Oklahoma	21	Nebraska	14
42	November 24, 1962	Norman	No. 10 Oklahoma	34	Nebraska	6
43	November 23, 1963	Lincoln	No. 10 Nebraska	29	No. 6 Oklahoma	20
44	November 21, 1964	Norman	Oklahoma	17	No. 4 Nebraska	7
45	November 25, 1965	Lincoln	No. 3 Nebraska	21	Oklahoma	9
46	November 24, 1966	Norman	Oklahoma	10	No. 4 Nebraska	9

No.	Date	Location	Winning team		Losing team	
47	November 25, 1967	Lincoln	No. 5 Oklahoma	21	Nebraska	14
48	November 23, 1968	Norman	No. 14 Oklahoma	47	Nebraska	0
49	November 22, 1969	Norman	No. 16 Nebraska	44	Oklahoma	14
50	November 21, 1970	Lincoln	No. 3 Nebraska	28	Oklahoma	21
51	November 25, 1971	Norman	No. 1 Nebraska	35	No. 2 Oklahoma	31
52	November 23, 1972	Lincoln	No. 4 Oklahoma	17	No. 5 Nebraska	14
53	November 23, 1973	Norman	No. 3 Oklahoma	27	No. 10 Nebraska	0
54	November 23, 1974	Lincoln	No. 1 Oklahoma	28	No. 6 Nebraska	14
55	November 22, 1975	Norman	No. 7 Oklahoma	35	No. 2 Nebraska	10
56	November 26, 1976	Lincoln	No. 8 Oklahoma	20	No. 10 Nebraska	17
57	November 25, 1977	Norman	No. 3 Oklahoma	38	No. 11 Nebraska	7
58	November 11, 1978	Lincoln	No. 4 Nebraska	17	No. 1 Oklahoma	14
59	January 1, 1979	Miami	No. 4 Oklahoma	31	No. 6 Nebraska	24
60	November 24, 1979	Norman	No. 8 Oklahoma	17	No. 3 Nebraska	14
61	November 22, 1980	Lincoln	No. 9 Oklahoma	21	No. 4 Nebraska	17
62	November 21, 1981	Norman	No. 5 Nebraska	37	Oklahoma	14
63	November 26, 1982	Lincoln	No. 3 Nebraska	28	No. 11 Oklahoma	24
64	November 26, 1983	Norman	No. 1 Nebraska	28	Oklahoma	21
65	November 17, 1984	Lincoln	No. 4 Oklahoma	17	No. 1 Nebraska	7
66	November 23, 1985	Norman	No. 5 Oklahoma	27	No. 2 Nebraska	7
67	November 22, 1986	Lincoln	No. 3 Oklahoma	20	No. 5 Nebraska	17
68	November 21, 1987	Lincoln	No. 2 Oklahoma	17	No. 1 Nebraska	7
69	November 19, 1988	Norman	No. 7 Nebraska	7	No. 9 Oklahoma	3
70	November 18, 1989	Lincoln	No. 6 Nebraska	42	Oklahoma	25
71	November 23, 1990	Norman	Oklahoma	45	No. 10 Nebraska	10
72	November 29, 1991	Lincoln	No. 11 Nebraska	19	No. 19 Oklahoma	14
73	November 27, 1992	Norman	No. 12 Nebraska	33	Oklahoma	9
74	November 26, 1993	Lincoln	No. 2 Nebraska	21	No. 16 Oklahoma	7
75	November 25, 1994	Norman	No. 1 Nebraska	13	Oklahoma	3
76	November 24, 1995	Lincoln	No. 1 Nebraska	37	Oklahoma	0
77	November 2, 1996	Norman	No. 5 Nebraska	73	Oklahoma	21
78	November 1, 1997	Lincoln	No. 1 Nebraska	69	Oklahoma	7
79	October 28, 2000	Norman	No. 3 Oklahoma	31	No. 1 Nebraska	14
80	October 27, 2001	Lincoln	No. 3 Nebraska	20	No. 2 Oklahoma	10
81	November 13, 2004	Norman	No. 2 Oklahoma	30	Nebraska	3
82	October 29, 2005	Lincoln	Oklahoma	31	Nebraska	24
83	December 2, 2006	Kansas City	No. 8 Oklahoma	21	No. 19 Nebraska	7
84	November 1, 2008	Norman	No. 4 Oklahoma	62	Nebraska	28
85	November 7, 2009	Lincoln	Nebraska	10	No. 20 Oklahoma	3
86	December 4, 2010	Arlington	No. 9 Oklahoma	23	No. 13 Nebraska	20
87	September 18, 2021	Norman	No. 3 Oklahoma	23	Nebraska	16
88	September 17, 2022	Lincoln	No. 6 Oklahoma	49	Nebraska	14
89	September 15, 2029	Norman				
90	September 14, 2030	Lincoln				
Series: Oklahoma leads 47–38–3

=== Top-five games ===
Since the Associated Press began weekly polling in 1936, Nebraska and Oklahoma have met nine times with both ranked in the top five, including AP No. 1 vs. No. 2 games in 1971 and 1987 and BCS No. 1 vs. No. 2 games in 2000 and 2001. Oklahoma is 6–3 in these meetings.

Nebraska victories	Oklahoma victories	Tie games

No.	Date	Location	Winning team		Losing team	
1	November 25, 1971	Norman	No. 1 Nebraska	35	No. 2 Oklahoma	31
2	November 23, 1972	Lincoln	No. 4 Oklahoma	17	No. 5 Nebraska	14
3	November 11, 1978	Lincoln	No. 4 Nebraska	17	No. 1 Oklahoma	14
4	November 17, 1984	Lincoln	No. 4 Oklahoma	17	No. 1 Nebraska	7
5	November 23, 1985	Norman	No. 5 Oklahoma	27	No. 2 Nebraska	7
6	November 22, 1986	Lincoln	No. 3 Oklahoma	20	No. 5 Nebraska	17
7	November 21, 1987	Lincoln	No. 2 Oklahoma	17	No. 1 Nebraska	7
8	October 28, 2000	Norman	No. 3 Oklahoma	31	No. 1 Nebraska	14
9	October 27, 2001	Lincoln	No. 3 Nebraska	20	No. 2 Oklahoma	10
Series: Oklahoma leads 6–3

=== Results by type ===
By venue
Count	Venue	Series
41	Memorial Stadium	NU 20–19–2
39	Owen Field	OU 24–15
2	Nebraska Field	NU 2–0
1	Arrowhead Stadium	OU 1–0
1	Boyd Field	NU 1–0
1	Cowboys Stadium	OU 1–0
1	Miami Orange Bowl	OU 1–0
1	Rourke Park	Tied 0–0–1
1	Taft Stadium	OU 1–0

By game type
Count	Game type	Series
73	MVIAA / Big Eight	OU 38–33–2
8	Big 12	Tied 4–4
4	Non-conference	OU 2–1–1
3	Postseason	OU 3–0

== See also ==
- List of NCAA college football rivalry games
