= Norris Stevenson =

American gridiron football player (1939–2012)

No. 71, 72
- Position: Running back

Personal information
- Born: October 27, 1939; St. Louis, Missouri, U.S.
- Died: March 3, 2012 (aged 72); St. Louis, Missouri, U.S.
- Listed height: 5 ft 11 in (1.80 m)
- Listed weight: 190 lb (86 kg)

Career information
- High school: Vashon (MO)
- College: Missouri
- NFL draft: 1961: 11th round, 142nd overall pick
- AFL draft: 1961: 12th round, 93rd overall pick

Career history
- Dallas Cowboys (1961)*; BC Lions (1963)
- * Offseason or practice squad member only

Career CFL statistics
- Games played: 3

Norris R. Stevenson (October 27, 1939 – March 3, 2012) was an American fullback in the Canadian Football League (CFL) for the BC Lions. He played college football at the University of Missouri. He was selected in eleventh round of the 1961 NFL draft by the Dallas Cowboys.

== Early life ==
Stevenson attended Vashon High School. He was the first African-American to receive a football scholarship from the University of Missouri. As a sophomore, he registered 77 carries for 307 yards (third on the team) and 4 touchdowns. As a junior, he had 60 carries for 267 yards (third on the team) and one receiving touchdown.

He became a starter as a senior, as part of a backfield known as the "Fearless Foursome" that also included Mel West, Donnie Smith and Norm Beal. He posted 85 carries for 610 yards (second on the team), a 7.2-yard average and 6 touchdowns, contributing to an undefeated team (11-0 after a later forfeit by the University of Kansas) that won the Big Eight Conference title and the 1961 Orange Bowl, 21–14 over the United States Naval Academy. He also helped defeat the University of Oklahoma 41–19, rushing for 169 yards with touchdowns of 77 and 60 yards, which moved the Tigers to the top of the national polls for the first time in school history.

He finished his college career with 222 carries for 1,184 yards, 5 rushing touchdowns, 11 receptions for 168 yards and 2 touchdowns. During his time the team had a 22-9-1 record, including two trips to the Orange Bowl.

In 2001, he was inducted into the University of Missouri Athletics Hall of Fame and the university dedicated in his honor the "Norris Stevenson Plaza of Champions", on the west side of Memorial Stadium. In 2011, he was inducted into the Missouri Sports Hall of Fame.

== Professional career ==
Norris was selected by the Dallas Cowboys in the 11th round (142nd overall) of the 1961 NFL draft and by the New York Titans in the 12th round (93rd overall) of the 1961 AFL draft. He was waived on September 5.

On February 6, 1962, he was signed by the BC Lions. During the season he played in 3 games, registering only 9 rushing yards.

== Personal life ==
After his football career, he became a track and field coach at Forest Park Community College and Florissant Valley Community College for almost 30 years. In 1999, he was inducted into the Missouri Track and Field Association Hall of Fame.

He was also an ordained CME Minister. He died of colon cancer on March 3, 2012.
