= Bill Jennings (American football) =

American football player and coach (1918–2002)

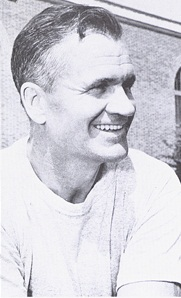
- Jennings from 1960 Cornhusker

Biographical details
- Born: March 13, 1918
- Died: June 8, 2002 (aged 84); Lawrence, Kansas, U.S.

Playing career
- 1938–1940: Oklahoma
- Positions: End, wingback

Coaching career (HC unless noted)
- 1941: Cushing HS (OK)
- 1947–1953: Oklahoma (backfield)
- 1956: Nebraska (backfield)
- 1957–1961: Nebraska

Administrative career (AD unless noted)
- 1964–1965: Washburn

Head coaching record
- Overall: 15–34–1 (college)

Accomplishments and honors

Awards
- First-team All-Big Six (1940)

William Arlen Jennings (March 13, 1918 – June 8, 2002) was an American college football player and coach and athletics administrator. He served as the head football coach of the University of Nebraska–Lincoln from 1957 to 1961. He coached the Nebraska Cornhuskers for five losing seasons, compiling a 15–34–1 record (.310). His best seasons were 1959 and 1960, when the Huskers were 4–6 in each year. His conference record was 8–24 (.250) and his Husker teams never won more than two conference games in a season.

Among Jennings's most notable upsets was the ending of Bud Wilkinson's 74-straight conference victories. The Cornhuskers beat the Oklahoma Sooners, 25–21, at Nebraska's 1959 homecoming game on Halloween. Jennings followed up a second consecutive win the following year with a 17–14 victory in Norman. The 1959 win was the first for Nebraska since 1942, and the 1959 and 1960 wins were the first consecutive victories over the Sooners since 1939 through 1942.

After a 3–6–1 season in 1961, Jennings was succeeded by Bob Devaney, who had been successful with Wyoming. Devaney immediately turned the Nebraska program around, winning with numerous players recruited by Jennings. The 1962 Huskers went 8–2 in the regular season and won the Gotham Bowl, Nebraska's first bowl game appearance in eight years and the first of 41 consecutive winning seasons.

Jennings died on June 8, 2002, at the age of 84 at his home in Lawrence, Kansas after suffering from prostate cancer.

== Head coaching record ==
=== College ===
Year	Team	Overall	Conference	Standing
Nebraska Cornhuskers (Big Seven / Big Eight Conference) (1957–1961)
1957	Nebraska	1–9	1–5	7th
1958	Nebraska	3–7	1–5	6th
1959	Nebraska	4–6	2–4	6th
1960	Nebraska	4–6	2–5	T–6th
1961	Nebraska	3–6–1	2–5	T–6th
Nebraska:		15–34–1	8–24	
Total:		15–34–1		
