= Mel West =

American football player (1939–2003)

No. 24, 25
- Position: Running back

Personal information
- Born: January 14, 1939; Columbia, Missouri, U.S.
- Died: November 20, 2003 (aged 64); Burnsville, Minnesota, U.S.
- Listed height: 5 ft 9 in (1.75 m)
- Listed weight: 190 lb (86 kg)

Career information
- High school: Jefferson City (Jefferson City, Missouri)
- College: Missouri
- NFL draft: 1961: 15th round, 204th overall pick
- AFL draft: 1961: 11th round, 82nd overall pick

Career history
- Boston Patriots (1961); New York Titans (1961–1962)

Awards and highlights
- First-team All-Big Eight (1960); 2× Second-team All-Big Eight (1958, 1959)

Career AFL statistics
- Rushing yards: 338
- Rushing average: 4.2
- Receptions: 14
- Receiving yards: 147
- Total touchdowns: 3
- Return yards: 488
- Stats at Pro Football Reference

Melvin Gerald West (January 14, 1939 — November 20, 2003) was an American professional football player who was a running back in the American Football League (AFL). He played college football for the Missouri Tigers.

== College career ==
Along with Norris Stevenson who was the first, West was the second African American scholarship player at the University of Missouri. He led the Tigers in rushing and total offense for three straight seasons. West was named first-team All-Big Eight Conference as a senior in 1960 and rushing for 650 yards and scoring five touchdowns. West left Missouri as the school's all-time leading rusher with 1,848 yards and was inducted into the Athletic Hall of Fame in 1993.

== Professional career ==
West was selected by the St. Louis Cardinals in the 15th round of the 1961 NFL draft and by the Boston Patriots in the 11th round of the 1961 AFL draft and opted to sign with the Patriots. After four games with the Patriots, West was released and was signed by the New York Titans. West scored two touchdowns in the Titans' season finale against the Dallas Texans. He finished the season with 72 carries for 322 yards and three touchdowns, 13 receptions for 146 yards and 13 kickoffs returned for 306 yards. West was cut by the Titans three games into the 1962 season following a knee injury.

== Post-football ==
After the end of his football career West returned to Missouri and graduated with a master's degree in education. He moved to Minnesota and was a principal for Minneapolis Public Schools for 23 years. West died on November 20, 2003, in Burnsville, Minnesota.
