= Prentice Gautt =

American football player and coach (1938–2005)

No. 40, 22
- Position: Running back

Personal information
- Born: February 8, 1938; Oklahoma City, Oklahoma, U.S.
- Died: March 17, 2005 (aged 67); Lawrence, Kansas, U.S.
- Listed height: 6 ft 1 in (1.85 m)
- Listed weight: 210 lb (95 kg)

Career information
- High school: Douglass (Oklahoma City)
- College: Oklahoma
- NFL draft: 1960: 2nd round, 19th overall pick
- AFL draft: 1960: 2nd round

Career history
- Cleveland Browns (1960); St. Louis Cardinals (1961–1967)

Awards and highlights
- Third-team All-American (1959); 2× First-team All-Big Eight (1958, 1959)

Career NFL statistics
- Rushing yards: 2,466
- Rushing average: 3.9
- Receptions: 79
- Receiving yards: 901
- Total touchdowns: 17
- Stats at Pro Football Reference

Prentice Gautt (February 8, 1938 – March 17, 2005) was an American football running back for the University of Oklahoma football team from 1956 to 1959. Gautt was the first black football player at the University of Oklahoma where he wore #38.

When former Sooners coach Bud Wilkinson was pressured against giving Gautt a scholarship, a group of black doctors and pharmacists gave him money to attend the school. Within a year, Gautt had a scholarship and the donated money was given to another black student. Gautt then became a two-time All-Big Eight player. His senior year, he was named to the Academic All-American team.

He played football professionally in the NFL with the Cleveland Browns (one year) and St. Louis Cardinals (six years).

After the NFL, Gautt coached football at Missouri while earning his Ph.D. in psychology. He then started a career in athletics administration, first as an assistant commissioner for the Big Eight Conference and as a special assistant to the commissioner of the Big 12 Conference.

Gautt played high school football at Frederick A. Douglass High School in Oklahoma City. His senior year, he became the first black player to play in the All-State game and he earned MVP honors.

Gautt died on March 17, 2005, from flu-like symptoms.

He was posthumously given the 2005 Outstanding Contribution to Amateur Football Award by The National Football Foundation (NFF) & College Football Hall of Fame in May 2005.
