= Keith Gilbertson =

American football player and coach (born 1948)

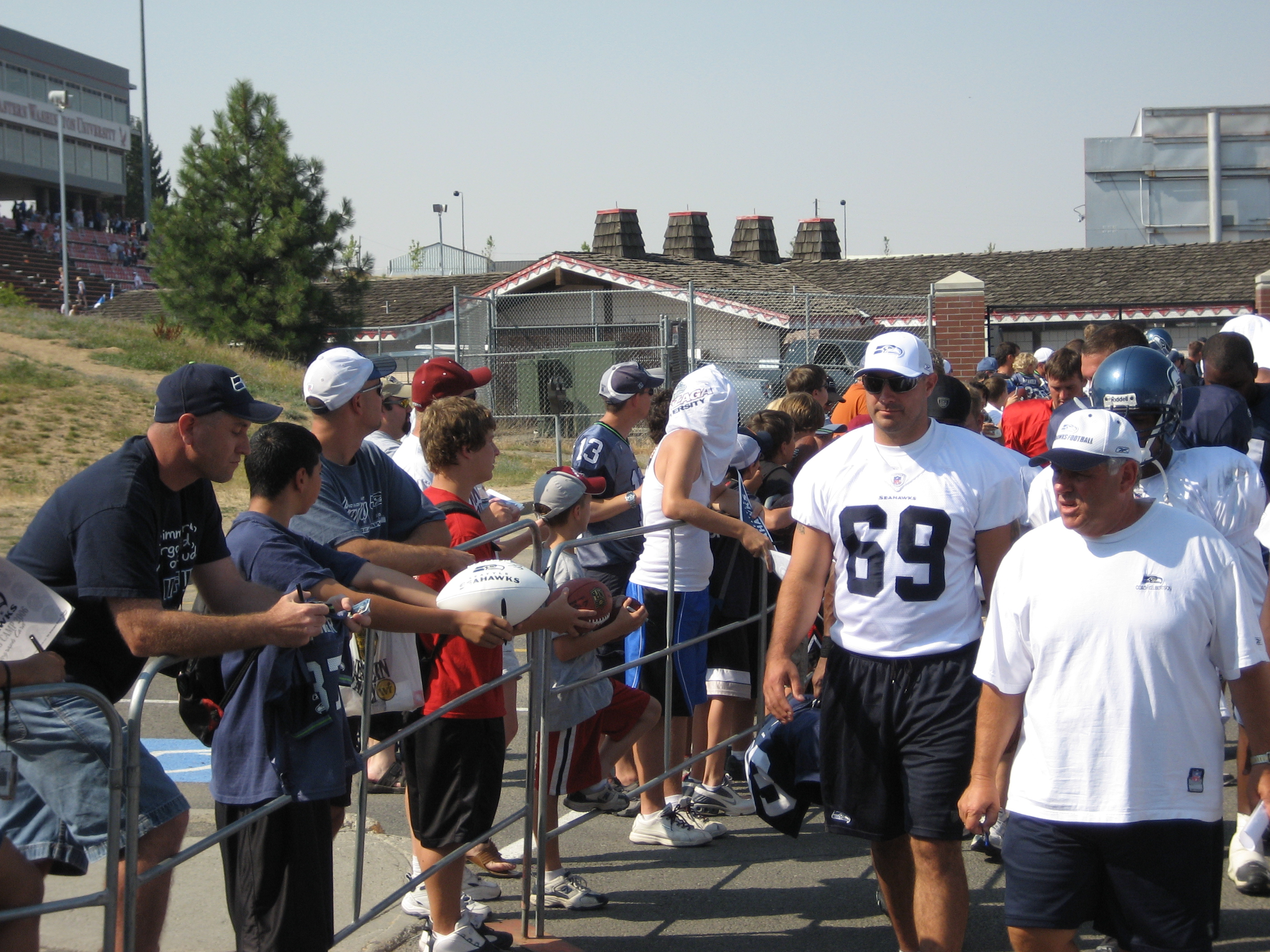
- Gilbertson (far right) with the Seattle Seahawks in 2006

Biographical details
- Born: May 15, 1948 (age 78); Snohomish, Washington, U.S.
- Education: Central Washington University; B.S. 1971

Playing career
- 1967: Central Washington
- 1968: Columbia Basin JC
- 1969–1970: Hawaii
- Position: Offensive lineman

Coaching career (HC unless noted)
- 1971–1974: Idaho State (GA)
- 1975: Western Washington (GA)
- 1976: Washington (GA)
- 1977–1981: Utah State (OC)
- 1982: Idaho (OC)
- 1983–1985: Los Angeles Express (OC)
- 1985: Idaho (OC)
- 1986–1988: Idaho
- 1989–1990: Washington (OL)
- 1991: Washington (OC/OL)
- 1992–1995: California
- 1996–1998: Seattle Seahawks (assistant)
- 1999: Washington (AHC)
- 2000–2002: Washington (AHC/OC)
- 2003–2004: Washington
- 2005–2008: Seattle Seahawks (assistant)
- 2010–2011: Cleveland Browns (scout)

Head coaching record
- Overall: 55–51
- Bowls: 1–0
- Tournaments: 2–3 (NCAA I-AA playoffs)

Keith Steven Gilbertson Jr. (born May 15, 1948) is a retired American football coach and player. He was the head coach at the University of Idaho (1986–1988), the University of California, Berkeley (1992–1995), and the University of Washington (2003–2004), compiling a career college football record of 55–51. Gilbertson retired in 2011 as a coach.

== Early life and playing career ==
The son of a high school football coach, Gilbertson grew up in Snohomish, Washington, northeast of Seattle. He graduated from Snohomish High School in 1966 and attended Central Washington University in Ellensburg, Columbia Basin College, the University of Hawaii, and returned to Central Washington, where he received a bachelor's degree in social sciences in 1971. He later earned a degree in education from Western Washington University in 1974.

== Coaching career ==
After three stints as a graduate assistant, Gilbertson became an offensive coordinator in 1977 at Utah State under head coach Bruce Snyder. After five seasons in Logan, he joined Dennis Erickson's new staff at Idaho, who immediately turned the Vandal program around in 1982, going 8–3 in the regular season and advancing to the quarterfinals of the I-AA playoffs. Shortly after, Gilbertson departed for the Los Angeles Express of the newly-formed United States Football League (USFL), where he coached as offensive coordinator for three spring seasons. Following the demise of the league, Gilbertson returned to Idaho in 1985, and the Vandals won their first Big Sky Conference title in fourteen years.

Erickson departed for Wyoming in December, and Gilbertson was promoted to head coach of the Vandal program. In his three seasons in Moscow as head coach (1986–88), Gilbertson's win–loss record was 28–9 (.757), which remains the best in UI history. His 19–4 (.826) record in conference play was the best-ever in the Big Sky.

Following consecutive conference championships and advancing to the Division I-AA semifinals, Gilbertson interviewed at UTEP in December 1988 but withdrew from consideration. Days later, he accepted an offer to coach the offensive line in the Pac-10 at Washington in Seattle under head coach Don James and offensive coordinator Gary Pinkel. The compensation was similar to his Idaho salary, about $55,000; Gilbertson replaced Dan Dorazio on the UW staff. After three wins to start the 1988 season, the Huskies finished 6–5 and 3–5 in conference, with losses to the USC Trojans, the UCLA Bruins, the Oregon Ducks, the Arizona Wildcats and the Washington State Cougars. Gilbertson's three-year stint concluded with the undefeated 1991 national championship team, for which he was also offensive coordinator.

Two weeks after winning the Rose Bowl, Gilbertson became the head coach at California in January 1992. Despite leading Cal to a 9–4 record in 1993 with a decisive victory in the Alamo Bowl, he was dismissed after his fourth season when the 1995 Bears went 3–8. Gilbertson's overall record at Cal was 20–26 (.435).

After Cal, he was an assistant coach for the Seattle Seahawks of the National Football League (NFL) for three seasons (1996–98) under Erickson; the last two years as tight ends coach. In 1999, he returned to the Washington Huskies as an assistant head coach under new head coach Rick Neuheisel.

Gilbertson became the head coach at Washington in 2003, following the abrupt summer dismissal of Neuheisel. His first season ended at 6–6; only a blowout loss to Cal in the next-to-last game of the season kept the Huskies out of a bowl game. The bottom fell out a year later, in which the Huskies finished 1–10. He resigned prior to the end of the season but remained the head coach through their last games; his record at Washington was 7–16 (.304) He then returned to the Seahawks as an assistant under Mike Holmgren.

Gilbertson's overall record as a collegiate head coach is 55–51 (.519).

== Head coaching record ==
=== College ===
Year	Team	Overall	Conference	Standing	Bowl/playoffs	Coaches^{#}	AP^{°}
Idaho Vandals football (Big Sky Conference) (1986–1988)
1986	Idaho	8–4	5–2	T–2nd	L NCAA Division I-AA First Round		
1987	Idaho	9–3	7–1	1st	L NCAA Division I-AA First Round		
1988	Idaho	11–2	7–1	1st	L NCAA Division I-AA Semifinal		
Idaho:		28–9	19–4				
California Golden Bears (Pacific-10 Conference) (1992–1995)
1992	California	4–7	2–6	9th			
1993	California	9–4	4–4	T–5th	W Alamo	24	25
1994	California	4–7	3–5	T–6th			
1995	California	3–8	2–6	T–8th			
California:		20–26	11–21				
Washington Huskies (Pacific-10 Conference) (2003–2004)
2003	Washington	6–6	4–4	T–5th			
2004	Washington	1–10	0–8	10th			
Washington:		7–16	4–12				
Total:		55–51					
National championship Conference title Conference division title or championship game berth
^{#}Rankings from final Coaches Poll.; ^{°}Rankings from final AP Poll.
