= 1988 Washington Huskies football team =

American college football season

1988 Washington Huskies football
- Conference: Pacific-10 Conference
- Record: 6–5 (3–5 Pac-10)
- Head coach: Don James (14th season)
- Offensive coordinator: Gary Pinkel (5th season)
- Defensive coordinator: Jim Lambright (11th season)
- MVP: Aaron Jenkins
- Captains: Ricky Andrews; Darryl Hall; Aaron Jenkins; Mike Zandofsky
- Home stadium: Husky Stadium

1988 Pacific-10 Conference football standings
	Conf.					Overall
Team	W		L		T	W		L		T
No. 7 USC $	8	–	0	–	0	10	–	2	–	0
No. 6 UCLA	6	–	2	–	0	10	–	2	–	0
No. 16 Washington State	5	–	3	–	0	9	–	3	–	0
Arizona	5	–	3	–	0	7	–	4	–	0
Arizona State	3	–	4	–	0	6	–	5	–	0
Washington	3	–	5	–	0	6	–	5	–	0
Oregon	3	–	5	–	0	6	–	6	–	0
Oregon State	2	–	5	–	1	4	–	6	–	1
Stanford	1	–	5	–	2	3	–	6	–	2
California	1	–	5	–	1	5	–	5	–	1
$ – Conference champion; Rankings from AP Poll

The 1988 Washington Huskies football team was an American football team that represented the University of Washington during the 1988 NCAA Division I-A football season. In its fourteenth season under head coach Don James, the team compiled a 6–5 record (3–5 in the Pacific-10 Conference, tied for sixth), and outscored its opponents 254 to 223. The five losses were by a combined margin of fifteen points. Washington did not play in a bowl game for the first time in ten seasons.

Aaron Jenkins was selected as the team's most valuable player. Jenkins, Ricky Andrews, Darryl Hall, and Mike Zandofsky were the team captains.

== Schedule ==
Date	Opponent	Rank	Site	Result	Attendance	Source
September 10	at Purdue*	No. 20	Ross–Ade Stadium; West Lafayette, IN	W 20–6	56,125	
September 17	Army*	No. 17	Husky Stadium; Seattle, WA	W 31–17	66,128	
September 24	San Jose State*	No. 17	Husky Stadium; Seattle, WA	W 35–31	63,692	
October 1	No. 2 UCLA	No. 16	Husky Stadium; Seattle, WA	L 17–24	71,224	
October 8	at Arizona State	No. 19	Sun Devil Stadium; Tempe, AZ	W 10–0	70,934	
October 15	at No. 3 USC	No. 16	Los Angeles Memorial Coliseum; Los Angeles, CA	L 27–28	62,974	
October 22	at Oregon	No. 17	Autzen Stadium; Eugene, OR (rivalry)	L 14–17	45,978	
October 29	Stanford		Husky Stadium; Seattle, WA	W 28–25	68,272	
November 5	Arizona		Husky Stadium; Seattle, WA	L 13–16	65,604	
November 12	California		Husky Stadium; Seattle, WA	W 28–27	58,823	
November 19	at Washington State		Martin Stadium; Pullman, WA (Apple Cup)	L 31–32	40,000	
*Non-conference game; Rankings from AP Poll released prior to the game

== Game summaries ==
=== Washington State ===
Washington Huskies at #19 Washington State Cougars

Quarter	1	2	3	4	Total
Washington	21	7	0	3	31
Washington St	9	7	10	6	32

at Martin Stadium, Pullman, Washington

- Date: November 19, 1988
- Game weather: Snow, 34 °F (1 °C)
- Game attendance: 40,000
- Eugene Register-Guard, 1988 Nov 20.

Game information

First quarter

- WSU – Jason Hanson 37-yard field goal, 11:53. Washington St 3–0. Drive:
- WASH – Vince Weathersby 14-yard run (John McCallum kick), 7:34. Washington 7–3. Drive: 6 plays, 65 yards.
- WASH – Aaron Jenkins 2-yard run (John McCallum kick), 7:11. Washington 14–3. Drive:
- WSU – Rich Swinton 4-yard run (run failed), 3:10. Washington 14–9. Drive: 9 plays, 75 yards.
- WASH – Le-Lo Lang 20-yard interception return (John McCallum kick). Washington 21–9.

Second quarter

- WSU – Tim Stallworth 11-yard pass from Timm Rosenbach (Jason Hanson kick), 11:42. Washington 21–16. Drive:
- WASH – Aaron Jenkins 4-yard run (John McCallum kick). Washington 28–16. Drive:

Third quarter

- WSU – Jason Hanson 32-yard field goal. Washington 28–19. Drive:
- WSU – Rich Swinton 2-yard run (Jason Hanson kick). Washington 28–26. Drive:

Fourth quarter

- WASH – John McCallum 20-yard field goal, 14:15. Washington 31–26. Drive:
- WSU – Timm Rosenbach 5-yard run (run failed), 9:06. Washington St 32–31. Drive:

Top passers

- WASH – Cary Conklin – 13/31, 99 yards
- WSU – Timm Rosenbach – 9/21, 148 yards, TD, int

Top rushers

- WASH – Aaron Jenkins – 17 rushes, 93 yards, 2 TD
- WSU – Rich Swinton – 31 rushes, 155 yards, 2 TD

Top receivers

- WASH – Brian Slater – 3 receptions, 38 yards
- WSU – Doug Wellsandt – 4 receptions, 64 yards

== Roster ==
1988 Washington Huskies football team roster
Players
Coaches
Offense

Pos.	#	Name	Class
QB	9	Eric Alozie	Fr
TE	89	Bill Ames	Jr
WR	80	Mario Bailey	Fr
C	60	Bern Brostek	Jr
RB	36	James Compton	So
QB	10	Cary Conklin	Jr
RB	39	Tony Covington	Sr
WR	4	Scott Fitzgerald	Sr
RB	29	Aaron Jenkins (C)	Sr
OL	66	Kelly John-Lewis	Sr
RB	48	Donald Jones	Fr
OT	79	Scott Jones	Sr
TE	81	Mark Kilpack	So
OL	51	Dean Kirkland	Sr
TB	20	Greg Lewis	So
OT	70	Siupeli Malamala	Fr
WR	4	Orlando McKay	Fr
OL	58	Jeff Pahukoa	So
TE	84	Aaron Pierce	Fr
WR	23	Andre Riley	Jr
WR	17	James Sawyer	Fr
WR	8	Brian Slater	Sr
RB	22	Vince Weathersby	Sr
OL	77	Brett Wiese	Sr
OT	75	Mike Zandofsky	Sr

Defense

Pos.	#	Name	Class
LB	55	Ricky Andrews (C)	Sr
DB	28	Eric Briscoe	So
DL	79	Dennis Brown	Jr
DB	21	Eugene Burkhalter	So
LB	46	Brett Collins	Fr
DE	90	Steve Emtman	Fr
LB	39	Chico Fraley	Fr
DB	5	Dana Hall	Fr
S	40	Darryl Hall (C)	Sr
LB	56	Martin Harrison	Jr
DL	94	Art Hunter	Jr
LB	59	Virgil Jones	Fr
DL	99	Jeff Kohlwes	So
CB	6	Le-Lo Lang	Jr
DB	4	Art Malone	Sr
DL	92	Dorie Murrey	Sr
DL	58	Travis Richardson	So
LB	47	Greg Travis	Jr
DL	96	Bob Willig	Sr
CB	25	Tony Zackery (C)	Sr

Special teams

Pos.	#	Name	Class
P	37	Eric Canton	So
K	3	John McCallum	Jr

Head coach

- Don James (14th year)

Coordinators/assistant coaches

- Gary Pinkel (OC)
- Jim Lambright (DC)
- Jay Niemann (GA)

Legend

- (C) Team captain
- (S) Suspended
- (I) Ineligible
- Injured
- Redshirt

== NFL draft ==
Five Huskies were selected in the 1989 NFL draft.

Player	Position	Round	Overall	Franchise
Mike Zandofsky	T	3	67	Phoenix Cardinals
Tony Zackery	CB	8	223	New England Patriots
Ricky Andrews	LB	10	260	San Diego Chargers
Brian Slater	FL	11	285	Pittsburgh Steelers
Scott Jones	T	12	334	Cincinnati Bengals
