= 1988 Arizona State Sun Devils football team =

American college football season

1988 Arizona State Sun Devils football
- Conference: Pacific-10 Conference
- Record: 6–5 (3–4 Pac-10)
- Head coach: Larry Marmie (1st season)
- Home stadium: Sun Devil Stadium

1988 Pacific-10 Conference football standings
| | Conf. | | | | | Overall |
| Team | W | | L | | T | W | | L | | T |
|---|---|---|---|---|---|---|---|---|---|---|
| No. 7 USC $ | 8 | – | 0 | – | 0 | 10 | – | 2 | – | 0 |
| No. 6 UCLA | 6 | – | 2 | – | 0 | 10 | – | 2 | – | 0 |
| No. 16 Washington State | 5 | – | 3 | – | 0 | 9 | – | 3 | – | 0 |
| Arizona | 5 | – | 3 | – | 0 | 7 | – | 4 | – | 0 |
| Arizona State | 3 | – | 4 | – | 0 | 6 | – | 5 | – | 0 |
| Washington | 3 | – | 5 | – | 0 | 6 | – | 5 | – | 0 |
| Oregon | 3 | – | 5 | – | 0 | 6 | – | 6 | – | 0 |
| Oregon State | 2 | – | 5 | – | 1 | 4 | – | 6 | – | 1 |
| Stanford | 1 | – | 5 | – | 2 | 3 | – | 6 | – | 2 |
| California | 1 | – | 5 | – | 1 | 5 | – | 5 | – | 1 |
$ – Conference champion; Rankings from AP Poll

The 1988 Arizona State Sun Devils football team was an American football team that represented Arizona State University as a member of the Pacific-10 Conference (Pac-10) during the 1988 NCAA Division I-A football season. In their first season under head coach Larry Marmie, the Sun Devils compiled a 6–5 record (3–4 against Pac-10 opponents), finished in fifth place in the Pac-10, and were outscored by their opponents by a combined total of 277 to 192.

The team's statistical leaders included Daniel Ford with 1,166 passing yards, Bruce Perkins with 446 rushing yards, and Leland Adams with 420 receiving yards.

== Schedule ==
| Date | Opponent | Site | Result | Attendance | Source |
|---|---|---|---|---|---|
| September 10 | Illinois* | Sun Devil Stadium; Tempe, AZ | W 21–16 | 70,091 | |
| September 17 | Colorado State* | Sun Devil Stadium; Tempe, AZ | W 28–17 | 70,822 | |
| September 24 | at No. 9 Nebraska* | Memorial Stadium; Lincoln, NE | L 16–47 | 76,312 | |
| October 1 | Lamar* | Sun Devil Stadium; Tempe, AZ | W 24–13 | 69,922 | |
| October 8 | No. 19 Washington | Sun Devil Stadium; Tempe, AZ | L 0–10 | 70,934 | |
| October 15 | at Stanford | Stanford Stadium; Stanford, CA | L 3–24 | 40,500 | |
| October 22 | at Washington State | Martin Stadium; Pullman, WA | W 31–28 | 33,170 | |
| October 29 | at No. 20 Oregon | Autzen Stadium; Eugene, OR | W 21–20 | 34,588 | |
| November 5 | Oregon State | Sun Devil Stadium; Tempe, AZ | W 30–24 | 70,508 | |
| November 12 | No. 2 USC | Sun Devil Stadium; Tempe, AZ | L 0–50 | 72,023 | |
| November 26 | at Arizona | Arizona Stadium; Tucson, AZ (rivalry) | L 18–28 | 56,978 | |
*Non-conference game; Rankings from AP Poll released prior to the game

== Game summaries ==
=== At Arizona ===
Arizona State Sun Devils (6–4) at Arizona Wildcats (6–4)

| Quarter | 1 | 2 | 3 | 4 | Total |
|---|---|---|---|---|---|
| Arizona St | 6 | 12 | 0 | 0 | 18 |
| Arizona | 0 | 21 | 0 | 7 | 28 |

at Arizona Stadium, Tucson, Arizona

- Date: November 26, 1988
- Game attendance: 56,978

| Team | Category | Player | Statistics |
|---|---|---|---|
| Arizona St | Passing | Paul Justin | 18/27, 225 Yds, 2 TD, 2 INT |
| Arizona St | Rushing | Bruce Perkins | 18 Rush, 93 Yds, TD |
| Arizona St | Receiving | Steve Martin | 4 Rec, 71 Yds |
| Arizona | Passing | Ronald Veal | 6/15, 148 Yds, 3 TD, 2 INT |
| Arizona | Rushing | Alonzo Washington | 24 Rush, 150 Yds, TD |
| Arizona | Receiving | Derek Hill | 3 Rec, 116 Yds, 2 TD |

Scoring summary

| Quarter | Time | Drive | | | Team | Scoring information | Score | |
| Quarter | Time | Plays | Yards | TOP | Team | Scoring information | ASU | UA |
|---|---|---|---|---|---|---|---|---|
| 1 | | | | | Arizona St | Ryan McReynolds 8-yard touchdown reception from Paul Justin, kick no good | 6 | 0 |
| 2 | | | | | Arizona | Derek Hill 47-yard touchdown reception from Ronald Veal, Doug Pfaff kick good | 6 | 7 |
| 2 | | | | | Arizona St | Bruce Perkins 44-yard touchdown run, 2-point pass failed | 12 | 7 |
| 2 | | | | | Arizona | Alonzo Washington 10-yard touchdown run, Doug Pfaff kick good | 12 | 14 |
| 2 | | | | | Arizona St | Ryan McReynolds 3-yard touchdown reception from Paul Justin, 2-point run failed | 18 | 14 |
| 2 | 0:00 | | | | Arizona | Derek Hill 55-yard touchdown reception from Ronald Veal, Doug Pfaff kick good | 18 | 21 |
| 4 | | 20 | 82 | | Arizona | Alonzo Washington 11-yard touchdown reception from Ronald Veal, Doug Pfaff kick good | 18 | 28 |
| "TOP" = time of possession. For other American football terms, see Glossary of American football. | | | | | | | 18 | 28 |

== Personnel ==
1988 Arizona State Sun Devils football team roster
Players
Coaches
Offense

| Pos. | # | Name | Class |
|---|---|---|---|
| QB | | Paul Justin |
| | | Steve Martin |
| | | Ryan McReynolds |
| RB | | Bruce Perkins |

Defense

| Pos. | # | Name | Class |

Special teams

| Pos. | # | Name | Class |

Head coach

- Larry Marmie

Coordinators/assistant coaches

Legend

- (C) Team captain
- (S) Suspended
- (I) Ineligible
- Injured
- Redshirt
