= 1987 All-Pacific-10 Conference football team =

The 1987 All-Pacific-10 Conference football team consists of American football players chosen by various organizations for All-Pacific-10 Conference teams for the 1987 college football season.

== Offensive selections ==
=== Quarterbacks ===
- Troy Aikman, UCLA (Coaches-1)
- Rodney Peete, USC (Coaches-2)

=== Running backs ===
- Gaston Green, UCLA (Coaches-1)
- Steven Webster, USC (Coaches-1)
- Darryl Harris, Arizona St. (Coaches-1)
- Channing Williams, Arizona St. (Coaches-2)
- Brad Muster, Stanford (Coaches-2)
- Steve Broussard, Washington St. (Coaches-2)

=== Wide receivers ===
- Aaron Cox, Arizona St. (Coaches-1)
- Derek Hill, Arizona (Coaches-1)
- Robb Thomas, Oregon St. (Coaches-2)
- Jeff James, Stanford (Coaches-2)

=== Tight ends ===
- Paul Green, USC (Coaches-1)
- Phil Ross, Oregon St. (Coaches-2)

=== Tackles ===
- Dave Cadigan, USC (Coaches-1)
- David Richards, UCLA (Coaches-1)
- Dave Orndorff, Oregon St. (Coaches-2)

=== Guards ===
- Randall McDaniel, Arizona St. (Coaches-1)
- Mike Zandofsky, Washington (Coaches-1)
- Mike Utley, Washington St. (Coaches-2)
- Dave Zawatson, California (Coaches-2)

=== Centers ===
- Joe Tofflemire, Arizona (Coaches-1)
- Andy Sinclair, Stanford (Coaches-2)
- Frank Cornish, UCLA (Coaches-2)

== Defensive selections ==
=== Linemen ===
- Dana Wells, Arizona (Coaches-1)
- Shawn Patterson, Arizona St. (Coaches-1)
- Rollin Putzier, Oregon (Coaches-1)
- Terry Tumey, UCLA (Coaches-1)
- Dennis Brown, Washington (Coaches-2)
- Jim Wahler, UCLA (Coaches-2)
- Lester Archambeau, Stanford (Coaches-2)
- Ray Huckestein, Stanford (Coaches-2)
- Tim Ryan, USC (Coaches-2)

=== Linebackers ===
- Carnell Lake, UCLA (Coaches-1)
- Ken Norton Jr., UCLA (Coaches-1)
- Greg Clark, Arizona St. (Coaches-1)
- Ken Harvey, California (Coaches-1)
- David Rill, Washington (Coaches-2)
- Marcus Cotton, USC (Coaches-2)
- Keith Davis, USC (Coaches-2)
- Brian Forde, Washington St. (Coaches-2)
- David Ortega, California (Coaches-2)

=== Defensive backs ===
- Chuck Cecil, Arizona (Coaches-1)
- Anthony Newman, Oregon (Coaches-1)
- Brad Humphreys, Stanford (Coaches-1)
- Dennis Price, UCLA (Coaches-2)
- Greg Coauette, USC (Coaches-2)
- Darryl Henley, UCLA (Coaches-2)
- Cleveland Colter, USC (Coaches-2)

== Special teams ==
=== Placekickers ===
- Alfredo Velasco, UCLA (Coaches-1)
- Alan Zendejas, Arizona St. (Coaches-2)

=== Punters ===
- Scott Tabor. California (Coaches-1)
- Doug Robison, Stanford (Coaches-2)

=== Return specialists ===
- Alan Grant, Stanford (Coaches-1)
- Derek Hill, Arizona (Coaches-2)

== Key ==
Coaches = Pacific-10 head football coaches

== See also ==
- 1987 College Football All-America Team
