= 1988 California Golden Bears football team =

American college football season

1988 California Golden Bears football
- Conference: Pacific-10 Conference
- Record: 5–5–1 (1–5–1 Pac-10)
- Head coach: Bruce Snyder (2nd season)
- Defensive coordinator: Kent Baer (2nd season)
- Home stadium: California Memorial Stadium

1988 Pacific-10 Conference football standings
	Conf.					Overall
Team	W		L		T	W		L		T
No. 7 USC $	8	–	0	–	0	10	–	2	–	0
No. 6 UCLA	6	–	2	–	0	10	–	2	–	0
No. 16 Washington State	5	–	3	–	0	9	–	3	–	0
Arizona	5	–	3	–	0	7	–	4	–	0
Arizona State	3	–	4	–	0	6	–	5	–	0
Washington	3	–	5	–	0	6	–	5	–	0
Oregon	3	–	5	–	0	6	–	6	–	0
Oregon State	2	–	5	–	1	4	–	6	–	1
Stanford	1	–	5	–	2	3	–	6	–	2
California	1	–	5	–	1	5	–	5	–	1
$ – Conference champion; Rankings from AP Poll

The 1988 California Golden Bears football team was an American football team that represented the University of California, Berkeley in the Pacific-10 Conference (Pac-10) during the 1988 NCAA Division I-A football season. In their second year under head coach Bruce Snyder, the Golden Bears compiled a 5–5–1 record (1–5–1 against Pac-10 opponents), finished in last place in the Pac-10, and were outscored by their opponents by a combined total of 244 to 243.

The team's statistical leaders included Troy Taylor with 2,416 passing yards, Chris Richards with 729 rushing yards, and Darryl Ingram with 513 receiving yards.

== Schedule ==
Date	Opponent	Site	Result	Attendance	Source
September 10	Pacific (CA)*	California Memorial Stadium; Berkeley, CA	W 30–7	39,000	
September 17	at Oregon State	Parker Stadium; Corvallis, OR	L 16–17	25,266	
September 24	Kansas*	California Memorial Stadium; Berkeley, CA	W 52–21	34,000	
October 1	San Jose State*	California Memorial Stadium; Berkeley, CA	W 21–14	40,000	
October 8	at Washington State	Martin Stadium; Pullman, WA	L 13–44	27,077	
October 15	No. 2 UCLA	California Memorial Stadium; Berkeley, CA (rivalry)	L 21–38	58,000	
October 22	Temple*	California Memorial Stadium; Berkeley, CA	W 31–14	33,000	
October 29	at Arizona	Arizona Stadium; Tucson, AZ	W 10–7	47,182	
November 5	at No. 2 USC	Los Angeles Memorial Coliseum; Los Angeles, CA	L 3–35	73,937	
November 12	at Washington	Husky Stadium; Seattle, WA	L 27–28	58,823	
November 19	Stanford	California Memorial Stadium; Berkeley, CA (Big Game)	T 19–19	75,662	
*Non-conference game; Rankings from AP Poll released prior to the game

== Game summaries ==
=== At Arizona ===
California Golden Bears (4–3) at Arizona Wildcats (4–3)

Quarter	1	2	3	4	Total
California	0	3	0	7	10
Arizona	0	0	0	7	7

at Arizona Stadium, Tucson, Arizona

- Date: October 29, 1988
- Game attendance: 47,182

External videos
- Full game

Team	Category	Player	Statistics
California	Passing	Troy Taylor	15/30, 184 yds, TD, int
California	Rushing	Chris Richards	17 rush, 52 yds
California	Receiving	Vince Delgado	1 rec, 55 yds, TD
Arizona	Passing	Bobby Watters	8/24, 106 yds, int
Arizona	Rushing	Alonzo Washington	15 rush, 70 yds
Arizona	Receiving	Reggie McGill	4 rec, 46 yds

Scoring summary

Quarter	Time	Drive			Team	Scoring information	Score	
Quarter	Time	Plays	Yards	TOP	Team	Scoring information	CAL	AU
2					California	47-yard field goal by Robbie Keen	3	0
4					Arizona	Derek Hill 15-yard touchdown reception from Bart Recktenwald, Doug Pfaff kick good	3	7
4	8:21				California	Vince Delgado 55-yard touchdown reception from Troy Taylor, Robbie Keen kick good	10	7
"TOP" = time of possession. For other American football terms, see Glossary of American football.							10	7

=== Stanford ===
Stanford Cardinal (3–6–1) at California Golden Bears (5–5)

Quarter	1	2	3	4	Total
Stanford	3	10	3	3	19
California	3	9	0	7	19

at California Memorial Stadium, Berkeley, California

- Date: November 19
- Game time: 1:00 p.m.
- Game attendance: 75,662

Game information

First quarter

- CAL - Robbie Keen 36-yard field goal. California 3–0. Drive:
- STAN – John Hopkins 44-yard field goal. Tie 3–3. Drive:

Second quarter

- STAN – John Hopkins 46-yard field goal. Stanford 6–3. Drive:
- CAL – Robbie Keen 44-yard field goal. Tie 6–6. Drive:
- CAL – Robbie Keen 39-yard field goal. California 9–6. Drive:
- STAN – Kevin Scott 95-yard kickoff return (John Hopkins kick), 2:35. Stanford 13–9.
- CAL – Robbie Keen 21-yard field goal. Stanford 13–12. Drive:

Third quarter

- STAN – John Hopkins 21-yard field goal. Stanford 16–12. Drive: 71 yards.

Fourth quarter

- STAN – John Hopkins 21-yard field goal. Stanford 19–12. Drive:
- CAL – Mike Ford 19-yard pass from Troy Taylor (Robbie Keen kick), 9:08. Tie 19–19. Drive: 80 yards.

Top passers

- STAN – Jason Palumbis – 13/27, 181 yards, int
- CAL – Troy Taylor – 18/32, 226 yards, TD

Top rushers

- STAN – Jon Volpe – 23 rushes, 56 yards
- CAL – Todd Powers – 9 rushes, 55 yards

Top receivers

- STAN – Walter Batson – 2 receptions, 60 yards
- CAL – Rob Bimson – 5 receptions, 48 yards

== Roster ==
1988 California Golden Bears football team roster
Players
Coaches
Offense

Pos.	#	Name	Class
OL		Steve Andersen
OL		Troy Auzenne
WR		Rob Bimson
RB		Tyrone Bland
WR		Vince Delgado
WR		James Devers
OL		Robert Dos Remedios
QB		Ron Flores
WR		Mike Ford
RB		John Grillos
TE		Darryl Ingram
RB		Tim Jenkins
WR		Brian McGhee
WR		Chad Nightingale
QB		Mike Pawlawski
FB		Todd Powers
RB		Chris Richards
RB		Bob Schellenberg
WR		Michael Smith
OL		Tony Smith
TE		Steve Stafford
WR		Faasamala Tagaloa
QB		Troy Taylor
WR		Brian Treggs
RB		Brent Woodall
OL		Dave Zawatson

Defense

Pos.	#	Name	Class
DB		Ron English
DB		Darrin Greer
DB		John Hardy
LB		Steve Hendrickson
DL		Joe Nelms
LB		DeWayne Odom
DB		Travis Oliver
ILB		David Ortega
LB		Dan Slevin
DB		Derek Taylor
DL		Natu Tuatagaloa
DL		Majett Whiteside
DB		David Wilson	Fr

Special teams

Pos.	#	Name	Class
K, P		Robbie Keen	So
K		Chris Noonan

Head coach

- Bruce Snyder

Coordinators/assistant coaches

- Kent Baer (DC)

Legend

- (C) Team captain
- (S) Suspended
- (I) Ineligible
- Injured
- Redshirt
