= 1988 All-Pacific-10 Conference football team =

The 1988 All-Pacific-10 Conference football team consists of American football players chosen by various organizations for All-Pacific-10 Conference teams for the 1988 college football season.

== Offensive selections ==
=== Quarterbacks ===
- Rodney Peete, USC (Coaches-1)
- Timm Rosenbach, Washington St. (Coaches-2)

=== Running backs ===
- Steve Broussard, Washington St. (Coaches-1)
- Leroy Holt, USC (Coaches-1)
- Jon Volpe, Stanford (Coaches-1)
- Derek Loville, Oregon (Coaches-2)
- Eric Ball, UCLA (Coaches-2)
- Art Greathouse, Arizona (Coaches-2)

=== Wide receivers ===
- Erik Affholter, USC (Coaches-1)
- Robb Thomas, Oregon St. (Coaches-1)
- Tim Stallworth, Washington St. (Coaches-2)
- Brian Slater, Washington (Coaches-2)

=== Tight ends ===
- Scott Galbraith, USC (Coaches-1)
- Phil Ross, Oregon St. (Coaches-2)

=== Tackles ===
- Frank Cornish, UCLA (Coaches-1)
- John Guerrero, USC (Coaches-2)
- Chris Dyko, Washington St. (Coaches-2)
- Scott Kirby, Arizona St. (Coaches-2)

=== Guards ===
- Mike Utley, Washington St. (Coaches-1)
- Mike Zandofsky, Washington (Coaches-1)
- Mark Tucker, USC (Coaches-1)

=== Centers ===
- Joe Tofflemire, Arizona (Coaches-1)
- Andy Sinclair, Stanford (Coaches-2)

== Defensive selections ==
=== Linemen ===
- Dana Wells, Arizona (Coaches-1)
- Tim Ryan, USC (Coaches-1)
- Dan Owens, USC (Coaches-1)
- Dennis Brown, Washington (Coaches-1)
- Matt Brock, Oregon (Coaches-1)
- Lester Archambeau, Stanford (Coaches-2)
- Jim Wahler, UCLA (Coaches-2)
- Pellom McDaniels, Oregon St. (Coaches-2)

=== Linebackers ===
- Carnell Lake, UCLA (Coaches-1)
- Chance Johnson, UCLA (Coaches-1)
- Scott Ross, USC (Coaches-1)
- Chris Singleton, Arizona (Coaches-1)
- Rob Hinckley, Stanford (Coaches-1)
- David Ortega, California (Coaches-2)
- Mark Tingstad, Arizona St. (Coaches-2)
- Scott Kozak, Oregon (Coaches-2)

=== Defensive backs ===
- Darryl Henley, UCLA (Coaches-1)
- Chris Oldham, Oregon (Coaches-1)
- Mark Carrier, USC (Coaches-1)
- Cleveland Colter, USC (Coaches-1)
- Alan Grant, Stanford (Coaches-2)
- John Hardy, California (Coaches-2)
- Thom Kaumeyer, Oregon (Coaches-2)
- Artie Holmes, Washington St. (Coaches-2)

== Special teams ==
=== Placekickers ===
- Robbie Keen, California (Coaches-1)
- Alfredo Velasco, UCLA (Coaches-2)

=== Punters ===
- Robbie Keen, California (Coaches-1)
- Mike Schuh, Arizona St. (Coaches-2)

=== Return specialists ===
- Darryl Henley, UCLA (Coaches-1)
- Chris Oldham, Oregon (Coaches-2)

== Key ==
Coaches = Pacific-10 head football coaches

== See also ==
- 1988 College Football All-America Team
