= 1988 Washington State Cougars football team =

American college football season

1988 Washington State Cougars football
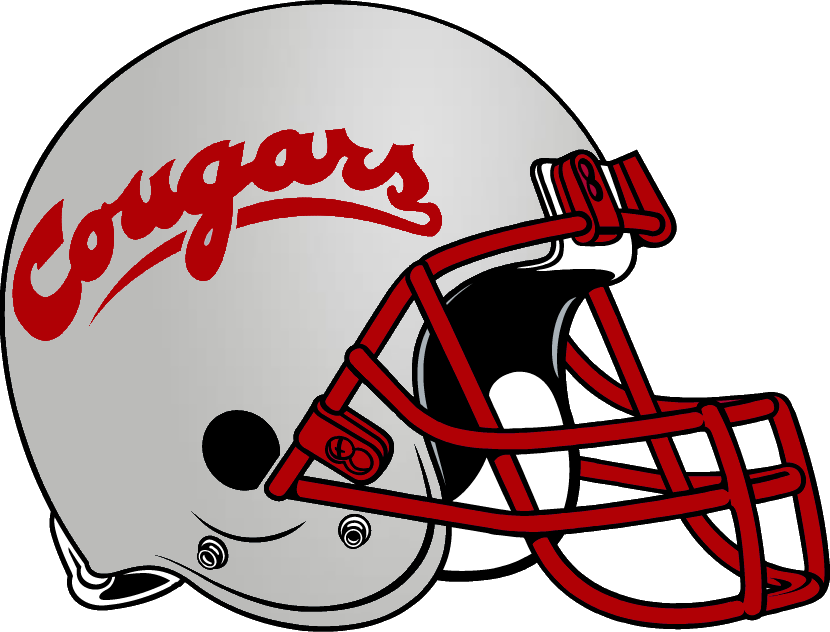

Aloha Bowl champion

Aloha Bowl, W 24–22 vs. Houston
- Conference: Pacific-10 Conference

Ranking
- Coaches: No. 16
- AP: No. 16
- Record: 9–3 (5–3 Pac-10)
- Head coach: Dennis Erickson (2nd season)
- Offensive coordinator: Bob Bratkowski (2nd season)
- Offensive scheme: Single-back spread
- Defensive coordinator: John L. Smith (2nd season)
- Base defense: 4–3
- Captains: Ivan Cook; Timm Rosenbach
- Home stadium: Martin Stadium

1988 Pacific-10 Conference football standings
	Conf.					Overall
Team	W		L		T	W		L		T
No. 7 USC $	8	–	0	–	0	10	–	2	–	0
No. 6 UCLA	6	–	2	–	0	10	–	2	–	0
No. 16 Washington State	5	–	3	–	0	9	–	3	–	0
Arizona	5	–	3	–	0	7	–	4	–	0
Arizona State	3	–	4	–	0	6	–	5	–	0
Washington	3	–	5	–	0	6	–	5	–	0
Oregon	3	–	5	–	0	6	–	6	–	0
Oregon State	2	–	5	–	1	4	–	6	–	1
Stanford	1	–	5	–	2	3	–	6	–	2
California	1	–	5	–	1	5	–	5	–	1
$ – Conference champion; Rankings from AP Poll

The 1988 Washington State Cougars football team was an American football team that represented Washington State University in the Pacific-10 Conference (Pac-10) during the 1988 NCAA Division I-A football season. In their second and final season under head coach Dennis Erickson, the Cougars compiled a 9–3 record (5–3 in Pac-10, tied for third), and outscored their opponents 415 to 303.

The team's statistical leaders included Timm Rosenbach with 3,097 passing yards, Steve Broussard with 1,280 rushing yards, and Tim Stallworth with 1,151 receiving yards.

On October 29, Washington State beat No. 1 UCLA at the Rose Bowl, their first and only win ever over a No. 1 ranked team.

Several months after this season, Erickson departed for Miami in early March 1989, and Mike Price was hired a week later; a former Cougar player and assistant, he was previously the head coach for eight years in the Big Sky Conference at Weber State in Ogden, Utah.

Quarterback Rosenbach opted not to stay as a fifth-year senior in 1989 and announced his intent to turn professional in April. He entered the NFL's supplemental draft, and was selected in July with the second pick by the recently relocated Phoenix Cardinals.

== Schedule ==
Date	Opponent	Rank	Site	TV	Result	Attendance	Source
September 3	at Illinois*		Memorial Stadium; Champaign, IL		W 44–7	54,458	
September 10	at Minnesota*		Hubert H. Humphrey Metrodome; Minneapolis, MN		W 41–9	40,071	
September 17	Oregon		Martin Stadium; Pullman, WA		L 28–43	30,263	
October 1	at Tennessee*		Neyland Stadium; Knoxville, TN		W 52–24	92,276	
October 8	California^{†}		Martin Stadium; Pullman, WA		W 44–13	27,077	
October 15	at Arizona		Arizona Stadium; Tucson, AZ		L 28–45	48,287	
October 22	Arizona State		Martin Stadium; Pullman, WA		L 28–31	33,170	
October 29	at No. 1 UCLA		Rose Bowl; Pasadena, CA		W 34–30	51,970	
November 5	at Stanford		Stanford Stadium; Stanford, CA		W 24–21	36,500	
November 12	Oregon State	No. 20	Martin Stadium; Pullman, WA		W 36–27	19,702	
November 19	Washington	No. 19	Martin Stadium; Pullman, WA (Apple Cup)		W 32–31	40,000	
December 25	vs. No. 14 Houston*	No. 18	Aloha Bowl; Halawa, HI (Aloha Bowl)	ABC	W 24–22	35,132	
*Non-conference game; ^{†}Homecoming; Rankings from AP Poll released prior to the game

== Game summaries ==
=== Illinois ===
Team	1	2	3	4	Total
• Wash St	7	16	14	7	44
Illinois	0	7	0	0	7

- Date: September 3
- Location: Memorial Stadium
- Game attendance: 54,458

Scoring summary
Q1	WSU	Rosenbach 16 yard run (Hanson kick)	WSU 7–0
Q2	WSU	Hanson 41 yard field goal	WSU 10–0
Q2	WSU	Rosenbach 6 yard run (kick failed)	WSU 16–0
Q2	ILL	Griffith 53 yard run (Higgins kick)	WSU 16–7
Q2	WSU	Broussard 1 yard run (Hanson kick)	WSU 23–7
Q3	WSU	Broussard 16 yard run (Hanson kick)	WSU 30–7
Q3	WSU	Stallworth 5 yard pass from Rosenbach (Hanson kick)	WSU 37–7
Q4	WSU	Rosenbach 1 yard run (Hanson kick)	WSU 44–7

- Steve Broussard: 27 rush, 173 yds

=== Washington ===
Washington Huskies at #19 Washington State Cougars

Quarter	1	2	3	4	Total
Washington	21	7	0	3	31
Washington St	9	7	10	6	32

at Martin Stadium, Pullman, Washington

- Date: November 19, 1988
- Game weather: Snow, 34 °F (1 °C)
- Game attendance: 40,000
- Eugene Register-Guard, 1988 Nov 20.

Game information

First quarter

- WSU – Jason Hanson 37-yard field goal, 11:53. Washington St 3–0. Drive:
- WASH – Vince Weathersby 14-yard run (John McCallum kick), 7:34. Washington 7–3. Drive: 6 plays, 65 yards.
- WASH – Aaron Jenkins 2-yard run (John McCallum kick), 7:11. Washington 14–3. Drive:
- WSU – Rich Swinton 4-yard run (run failed), 3:10. Washington 14–9. Drive: 9 plays, 75 yards.
- WASH – Le-Lo Lang 20-yard interception return (John McCallum kick). Washington 21–9.

Second quarter

- WSU – Tim Stallworth 11-yard pass from Timm Rosenbach (Jason Hanson kick), 11:42. Washington 21–16. Drive:
- WASH – Aaron Jenkins 4-yard run (John McCallum kick). Washington 28–16. Drive:

Third quarter

- WSU – Jason Hanson 32-yard field goal. Washington 28–19. Drive:
- WSU – Rich Swinton 2-yard run (Jason Hanson kick). Washington 28–26. Drive:

Fourth quarter

- WASH – John McCallum 20-yard field goal, 14:15. Washington 31–26. Drive:
- WSU – Timm Rosenbach 5-yard run (run failed), 9:06. Washington St 32–31. Drive:

Top passers

- WASH – Cary Conklin – 13/31, 99 yards
- WSU – Timm Rosenbach – 9/21, 148 yards, TD, int

Top rushers

- WASH – Aaron Jenkins – 17 rushes, 93 yards, 2 TD
- WSU – Rich Swinton – 31 rushes, 155 yards, 2 TD

Top receivers

- WASH – Brian Slater – 3 receptions, 38 yards
- WSU – Doug Wellsandt – 4 receptions, 64 yards

Shawn Landrum blocked an Eric Canton punt which led to Timm Rosenbach's eventual game-winning fourth down touchdown run. Washington State secured an Aloha Bowl berth with the win.

== Roster ==
1988 Washington State Cougars football team roster
Players
Coaches
Offense

Pos.	#	Name	Class
TE	49	Kevin Andal	Jr
RB	31	Steve Broussard	Jr
RB	34	Paul Carr	Fr
WR	1	C. J. Davis	Fr
OT	68	Chris Dyko	Sr
C	52	Dave Fakkema	Sr
QB	9	Aaron Garcia	Fr
QB	12	Brad Gossen	So
OT	73	John Husby	Sr
G	74	Jim Michalczik	Sr
TE	46	Rodd Olson	Jr
WR	88	William Pellum	Sr
QB	3	Timm Rosenbach (C)	Jr
RB	25	Thomas Rogers	Jr
RB	23	Rodney Scott	Fr
WR	2	Tim Stallworth	Jr
RB	33	Rich Swinton	So
WR	36	Elmer Thomas	Sr
RB	11	Ed Tingstad	Sr
G	60	Mike Utley	Sr
TE	82	Doug Wellsandt	Jr
WR	17	Michael Wimberly	Sr
WR	13	Victor Wood	Sr
C	56	Paul Wulff	Jr

Defense

Pos.	#	Name	Class
LB	55	Tuineau Alipate	Sr
DE	76	Ivan Cook (C)	Sr
DT	97	Tim Downing	Jr
DE	96	Randy Gray	Jr
LB	50	Dan Grayson	Jr
S	19	Artie Holmes	Sr
CB	18	Shawn Landrum	Sr
DB	10	Jay Languein	Jr
DT	91	Mark Ledbetter	Jr
S	42	Ron Lee	Sr
LB	40	Maury Metcalf	Sr
DB	6	Chris Moton	So
DB	37	Roosevelt Noble	Jr
LB	41	Bob O'Neal	Sr
LB	57	Keith Rice	Sr
DT	75	Tony Savage	Jr
CB	29	Vernon Todd	Sr
DL	90	Jeron Woodley	So

Special teams

Pos.	#	Name	Class
K	4	Jason Hanson	Fr
P	45	Rob Myers	Jr

Head coach

- Dennis Erickson (2nd year)

Coordinators/assistant coaches

- Bob Bratkowski (OC)
- John L. Smith (DC)

Legend

- (C) Team captain
- (S) Suspended
- (I) Ineligible
- Injured
- Redshirt

== NFL draft ==
Three Cougars were selected in the 1989 NFL draft, held April 23–24.

Player	Position	Round	Overall	Franchise
Mike Utley	G	3	59	Detroit Lions
Chris Dyko	T	8	221	Chicago Bears
Artie Holmes	DB	11	293	New York Jets

The supplemental draft was held on July 7.

Player	Position	Round	Overall	Franchise
Timm Rosenbach	QB	1	2	Phoenix Cardinals
