= Alan Grant (American football) =

American football player (born 1966)

No. 26, 24, 9
- Position: Cornerback

Personal information
- Born: October 1, 1966 (age 60); Pasadena, California, U.S.
- Listed height: 5 ft 10 in (1.78 m)
- Listed weight: 187 lb (85 kg)

Career information
- High school: La Cañada Flintridge (CA) Saint Francis
- College: Stanford
- NFL draft: 1990: 4th round, 103rd overall pick

Career history
- Indianapolis Colts (1990–1991); San Francisco 49ers (1992–1993); Cincinnati Bengals (1993); Washington Redskins (1994); Saskatchewan Roughriders (1996)

Awards and highlights
- Third-team All-American (1987); First-team All-Pac-10 (1987); Second-team All-Pac-10 (1988)

Career NFL statistics
- Tackles: 101
- Interceptions: 3
- Fumble recoveries: 2
- Stats at Pro Football Reference

Alan Hays Grant (born October 1, 1966) is an American former professional football player who was a cornerback in the National Football League (NFL) for the Indianapolis Colts, San Francisco 49ers, Cincinnati Bengals, and the Washington Redskins. He played college football for the Stanford Cardinal and was selected in the fourth round of the 1990 NFL draft.
