= 1988 Arizona Wildcats football team =

American college football season

1988 Arizona Wildcats football
- Conference: Pacific-10 Conference
- Record: 7–4 (5–3 Pac-10)
- Head coach: Dick Tomey (2nd season)
- Offensive coordinator: Ben Griffith (2nd season)
- Defensive coordinator: Larry Mac Duff (2nd season)
- Home stadium: Arizona Stadium

1988 Pacific-10 Conference football standings
| | Conf. | | | | | Overall |
| Team | W | | L | | T | W | | L | | T |
|---|---|---|---|---|---|---|---|---|---|---|
| No. 7 USC $ | 8 | – | 0 | – | 0 | 10 | – | 2 | – | 0 |
| No. 6 UCLA | 6 | – | 2 | – | 0 | 10 | – | 2 | – | 0 |
| No. 16 Washington State | 5 | – | 3 | – | 0 | 9 | – | 3 | – | 0 |
| Arizona | 5 | – | 3 | – | 0 | 7 | – | 4 | – | 0 |
| Arizona State | 3 | – | 4 | – | 0 | 6 | – | 5 | – | 0 |
| Washington | 3 | – | 5 | – | 0 | 6 | – | 5 | – | 0 |
| Oregon | 3 | – | 5 | – | 0 | 6 | – | 6 | – | 0 |
| Oregon State | 2 | – | 5 | – | 1 | 4 | – | 6 | – | 1 |
| Stanford | 1 | – | 5 | – | 2 | 3 | – | 6 | – | 2 |
| California | 1 | – | 5 | – | 1 | 5 | – | 5 | – | 1 |
$ – Conference champion; Rankings from AP Poll

The 1988 Arizona Wildcats football team represented the University of Arizona in the Pacific-10 Conference (Pac-10) during the 1988 NCAA Division I-A football season. In their second season under head coach Dick Tomey, the Wildcats compiled a 7–4 record (5–3 against Pac-10 opponents), finished in a tie for third place in the Pac-10, and outscored their opponents, 279 to 218. The team played its home games in Arizona Stadium in Tucson, Arizona.

The team's statistical leaders included Ronald Veal with 669 passing yards, Alonzo Washington with 651 rushing yards, and Derek Hill with 508 receiving yards. Linebacker Chris Singleton led the team with 118 tackles.

Despite a 7–4 record, the Wildcats were left out of a bowl game due to a lack of bowls available at the time and that most of the bowls involved ranked teams.

== Before the season ==
The Wildcats completed the 1987 season and Tomey's first year with a 4–4–3 record and tied Arizona State in the rivalry contest. The team spent the offseason looking to improve on their record and return to their winning ways as they did under previous Arizona coach (and then-current USC coach) Larry Smith.

Despite the offseason being held in the shadow of Arizona's basketball team as a result of its first Final Four appearance and Tomey and his players supporting them, the team continued to rebuild and prepared for the upcoming season.

== Schedule ==
| Date | Opponent | Site | TV | Result | Attendance | Source |
|---|---|---|---|---|---|---|
| September 3 | at Oregon State | Parker Stadium; Corvallis, OR | | W 24–13 | 23,142 | |
| September 10 | Texas Tech* | Arizona Stadium; Tucson, AZ | TBS | W 35–19 | 46,334 | |
| September 17 | at No. 4 Oklahoma* | Oklahoma Memorial Stadium; Norman, OK | | L 10–28 | 75,004 | |
| September 24 | Eastern Michigan* | Arizona Stadium; Tucson, AZ | KMSB | W 55–0 | 43,035 | |
| October 1 | No. 4 USC | Arizona Stadium; Tucson, AZ | | L 15–38 | 52,314 | |
| October 15 | Washington State | Arizona Stadium; Tucson, AZ | KMSB | W 45–28 | 48,287 | |
| October 22 | No. 1 UCLA | Arizona Stadium; Tucson, AZ | ABC | L 3–24 | 49,922 | |
| October 29 | California | Arizona Stadium; Tucson, AZ | KMSB | L 7–10 | 47,182 | |
| November 5 | at Washington | Husky Stadium; Seattle, WA | ESPN | W 16–13 | 60,204 | |
| November 12 | Oregon^{†} | Arizona Stadium; Tucson, AZ | KMSB | W 41–27 | 40,367 | |
| November 26 | Arizona State | Arizona Stadium; Tucson, AZ (rivalry) | TBS | W 28–18 | 56,978 | |
*Non-conference game; ^{†}Homecoming; Rankings from AP Poll released prior to the game

== Game summaries ==
=== Texas Tech ===
After earning a win in the opener at Oregon State, Arizona played its first home game of the season against Texas Tech. This was the first meeting between the two teams since they played in nine straight seasons from 1971 to 1979. After falling behind early, the Wildcats dominated the rest of the way and came away with the win.

=== At Oklahoma ===
Arizona Wildcats (1–0) at #4 Oklahoma Sooners (1–0)

| Quarter | 1 | 2 | 3 | 4 | Total |
|---|---|---|---|---|---|
| Arizona | 3 | 0 | 7 | 0 | 10 |
| Oklahoma | 7 | 7 | 7 | 7 | 28 |

at Oklahoma Memorial Stadium, Norman, Oklahoma

- Date: September 17, 1988
- Game attendance: 75,004

Game information

First quarter

- UA – Doug Pfaff 38-yard field goal. Arizona 3–0.
- OU – Leon Perry 1-yard run (R.D. Lashar kick). Oklahoma 7–3.

Second quarter

- OU – Jamelle Holieway 5-yard run (R.D. Lashar kick). Oklahoma 14–3.

Third quarter

- UA – Mario Hampton 9-yard run (Doug Pfaff kick). Oklahoma 14–10.
- OU – Eric Bross 43-yard pass from Jamelle Holieway (R.D. Lashar kick). Oklahoma 21–10.

Fourth quarter

- OU – Anthony Stafford 5-yard run (R.D. Lashar kick). Oklahoma 28–10.

Top passers

- UA – Bobby Watters – 11/25, 124 yards, 2 INT
- OU – Jamelle Holieway – 3/7, 73 yards, TD

Top rushers

- UA – Reggie McGill – 2 rushes, 50 yards
- OU – Jamelle Holieway – 17 rushes, 75 yards, TD

Top receivers

- UA – Art Greathouse – 4 receptions, 30 yards
- OU – Eric Bross – 1 reception, 43 yards, TD

The Wildcats traveled to Oklahoma in their first ever matchup against the Sooners. Despite playing tough, Arizona could not keep up with the fourth-ranked Sooners and eventually lost.

=== USC ===
The Wildcats welcomed former coach Larry Smith back to Tucson as Arizona hosted the fourth-ranked Trojans. Several mistakes became a disaster for the Wildcats and USC capitalized on them to break the game open and win big, and Tomey lost to his predecessor for the second consecutive year.

=== UCLA ===
Arizona hosted top-ranked UCLA in a big test for the Wildcats. Unfortunately, the Wildcats did not have an answer against the Bruins and avoided a shutout with a late field goal, and leading to yet another loss to a top-ten ranked opponent.

=== California ===
California Golden Bears (4–3) at Arizona Wildcats (4–3)

| Quarter | 1 | 2 | 3 | 4 | Total |
|---|---|---|---|---|---|
| California | 0 | 3 | 0 | 7 | 10 |
| Arizona | 0 | 0 | 0 | 7 | 7 |

at Arizona Stadium, Tucson, Arizona

- Date: October 29, 1988
- Game attendance: 47,182

External videos
- Full game

| Team | Category | Player | Statistics |
|---|---|---|---|
| California | Passing | Troy Taylor | 15/30, 184 Yds, TD, INT |
| California | Rushing | Chris Richards | 17 Rush, 52 Yds |
| California | Receiving | Vince Delgado | 1 Rec, 55 Yds, TD |
| Arizona | Passing | Bobby Watters | 8/24, 106 Yds, INT |
| Arizona | Rushing | Alonzo Washington | 15 Rush, 70 Yds |
| Arizona | Receiving | Reggie McGill | 4 Rec, 46 Yds |

Scoring summary

| Quarter | Time | Drive | | | Team | Scoring information | Score | |
| Quarter | Time | Plays | Yards | TOP | Team | Scoring information | CAL | AU |
|---|---|---|---|---|---|---|---|---|
| 2 | | | | | California | 47-yard field goal by Robbie Keen | 3 | 0 |
| 4 | | | | | Arizona | Derek Hill 15-yard touchdown reception from Bart Recktenwald, Doug Pfaff kick good | 3 | 7 |
| 4 | 8:21 | | | | California | Vince Delgado 55-yard touchdown reception from Troy Taylor, Robbie Keen kick good | 10 | 7 |
| "TOP" = time of possession. For other American football terms, see Glossary of American football. | | | | | | | 10 | 7 |

=== At Washington ===
On the road at Washington, Arizona visited the Huskies. In a game that was dominated by both teams’ defense, the Wildcats pulled through with a late field goal and finally captured their first win over Washington in team history.

=== Arizona State ===
Arizona State Sun Devils (6–4) at Arizona Wildcats (6–4)

| Quarter | 1 | 2 | 3 | 4 | Total |
|---|---|---|---|---|---|
| Arizona St | 6 | 12 | 0 | 0 | 18 |
| Arizona | 0 | 21 | 0 | 7 | 28 |

at Arizona Stadium, Tucson, Arizona

- Date: November 26, 1988
- Game attendance: 56,978

After getting a big homecoming win against Oregon, the Wildcats hosted Arizona State in a rivalry duel. Late in the first half before intermission, with the Sun Devils leading 18–14, Wildcat quarterback Ronald Veal threw a Hail Mary pass that was caught by receiver Derek Hill, who then ran to the end zone for a touchdown and Arizona led 21–18 at the break. The play gave the Wildcats the lead for good as they would not trail again and won it and extended their unbeaten streak over ASU to seven (including the 1987 tie). Veal's Hail Mary pass was referred to Arizona fans as the “Hail Veal”, “Hill Veal”, “Veal Mary” or simply “The Pass”, which was added to many other memorable play in the rivalry's history. The win ended the regular season and Arizona became bowl-eligible.

| Team | Category | Player | Statistics |
|---|---|---|---|
| Arizona St | Passing | Paul Justin | 18/27, 225 Yds, 2 TD, 2 INT |
| Arizona St | Rushing | Bruce Perkins | 18 Rush, 93 Yds, TD |
| Arizona St | Receiving | Steve Martin | 4 Rec, 71 Yds |
| Arizona | Passing | Ronald Veal | 6/15, 148 Yds, 3 TD, 2 INT |
| Arizona | Rushing | Alonzo Washington | 24 Rush, 150 Yds, TD |
| Arizona | Receiving | Derek Hill | 3 Rec, 116 Yds, 2 TD |

Scoring summary

| Quarter | Time | Drive | | | Team | Scoring information | Score | |
| Quarter | Time | Plays | Yards | TOP | Team | Scoring information | ASU | UA |
|---|---|---|---|---|---|---|---|---|
| 1 | | | | | Arizona St | Ryan McReynolds 8-yard touchdown reception from Paul Justin, kick no good | 6 | 0 |
| 2 | | | | | Arizona | Derek Hill 47-yard touchdown reception from Ronald Veal, Doug Pfaff kick good | 6 | 7 |
| 2 | | | | | Arizona St | Bruce Perkins 44-yard touchdown run, 2-point pass failed | 12 | 7 |
| 2 | | | | | Arizona | Alonzo Washington 10-yard touchdown run, Doug Pfaff kick good | 12 | 14 |
| 2 | | | | | Arizona St | Ryan McReynolds 3-yard touchdown reception from Paul Justin, 2-point run failed | 18 | 14 |
| 2 | 0:00 | | | | Arizona | Derek Hill 55-yard touchdown reception from Ronald Veal, Doug Pfaff kick good | 18 | 21 |
| 4 | | 20 | 82 | | Arizona | Alonzo Washington 11-yard touchdown reception from Ronald Veal, Doug Pfaff kick good | 18 | 28 |
| "TOP" = time of possession. For other American football terms, see Glossary of American football. | | | | | | | 18 | 28 |

== Awards and honors ==
- Dana Wells, DL, Pac-10 defensive player of the year and Morris Trophy winner (defense), First-team All-Pac-10
- Joe Tofflemire, OL, Pac-10 Morris Trophy winner (offense)

== Season notes ==
- The Wildcats improved on their 1987 record and achieved their goals with a winning season in 1988.
- Three of Arizona's four losses were to ranked teams, all of which were ranked in the top ten.
- Arizona had somewhat of a difficult schedule, but managed to win more games. Even though the Wildcats won seven games, they were snubbed from a bowl spot, with losses to ranked opponents, strength of schedule, and a lack of bowls at the time, were factors in them missing the postseason.
- This season was the first in which a former Arizona coach faced his successor at least two seasons after leaving the school. Smith's Trojans had also defeated Tomey's Wildcats in 1987.
- Due to Pac-10 scheduling, the Wildcats played eight home games and only three road ones. At one point during the season, Arizona played at home for five consecutive games, which was the longest span for the team since they 1979, when they also played five straight home games.
- Arizona's win over ASU was Tomey's first of several victories against his rivals. The final score (28–18) was identical to the 1982 meeting that began the Wildcats’ dominance over the Sun Devils.
- With nose tackle Dana Wells being awarded the Pac-10 defensive player of the year, Arizona won the conference's defensive award for the third straight season.
- Arizona would sweep the Pac-10's Morris Trophy awards, with lineman Joe Tofflemire winning on the offensive side and Wells on the defensive.
- Although it was overshadowed by its basketball counterpart due to its Final Four run earlier in the year, the football program managed to end the season on a winning note.

== Personnel ==
1988 Arizona Wildcats football team roster
Players
Coaches
Offense

| Pos. | # | Name | Class |
|---|---|---|---|
| QB | | Stuart Betty |
| OL | | John Brandom |
| RB | | Remy Carrasco |
| RB | | David Eldridge |
| OL | | Rob Fiory |
| RB | | Art Greathouse |
| RB | | Mario Hampton |
| WR | | Derek Hill |
| WR | | Kyle Jan |
| WR | | Kip Lewis |
| RB | | Reggie McGill |
| TE | | George Mihalopoulos |
| OL | | Glenn Parker |
| OL | | Doug Penner |
| OL | | Doug Pritchard |
| RB | | Bart Recktenwald |
| OL | | Dave Roney |
| RB | | Melvin Smith |
| RB | | Mike Streidnig |
| RB | | Aaron Thomas |
| OL | | Joe Tofflemire |
| OL | | Paul Tofflemire |
| QB | 10 | Ronald Veal | So |
| RB | | Alonzo Washington |
| QB | | Bobby Watters | RSr |
| RB | | Ron Wembley |
| OL | | Rod Woods |

Defense

| Pos. | # | Name | Class |
|---|---|---|---|
| LB | | Zeno Alexander |
| DB | | Todd Burden |
| LB | | Darren Case |
| DB | | James DeBow |
| DB | | Scott Geyer |
| DL | | Ken Hakes |
| DB | | Jeff Hammerschmidt |
| DL | | Brad Henke |
| DL | | Reggie Johnson |
| DB | | Darryl Lewis |
| LB | | Arnulf Mobley |
| LB | | Donnie Salum |
| LB | | Chris Singleton |
| LB | | Kevin Singleton |
| DL | | Dana Wells |
| DB | | Chris Wright |

Special teams

| Pos. | # | Name | Class |
|---|---|---|---|
| K | | Gary Coston |
| K | | Robert Epstein |
| P | | Bret Holley |
| K | | Doug Pfaff |

Head coach

- Dick Tomey

Coordinators/assistant coaches

Legend

- (C) Team captain
- (S) Suspended
- (I) Ineligible
- Injured
- Redshirt
