= Larry Marmie =

American football player and coach (born 1942)

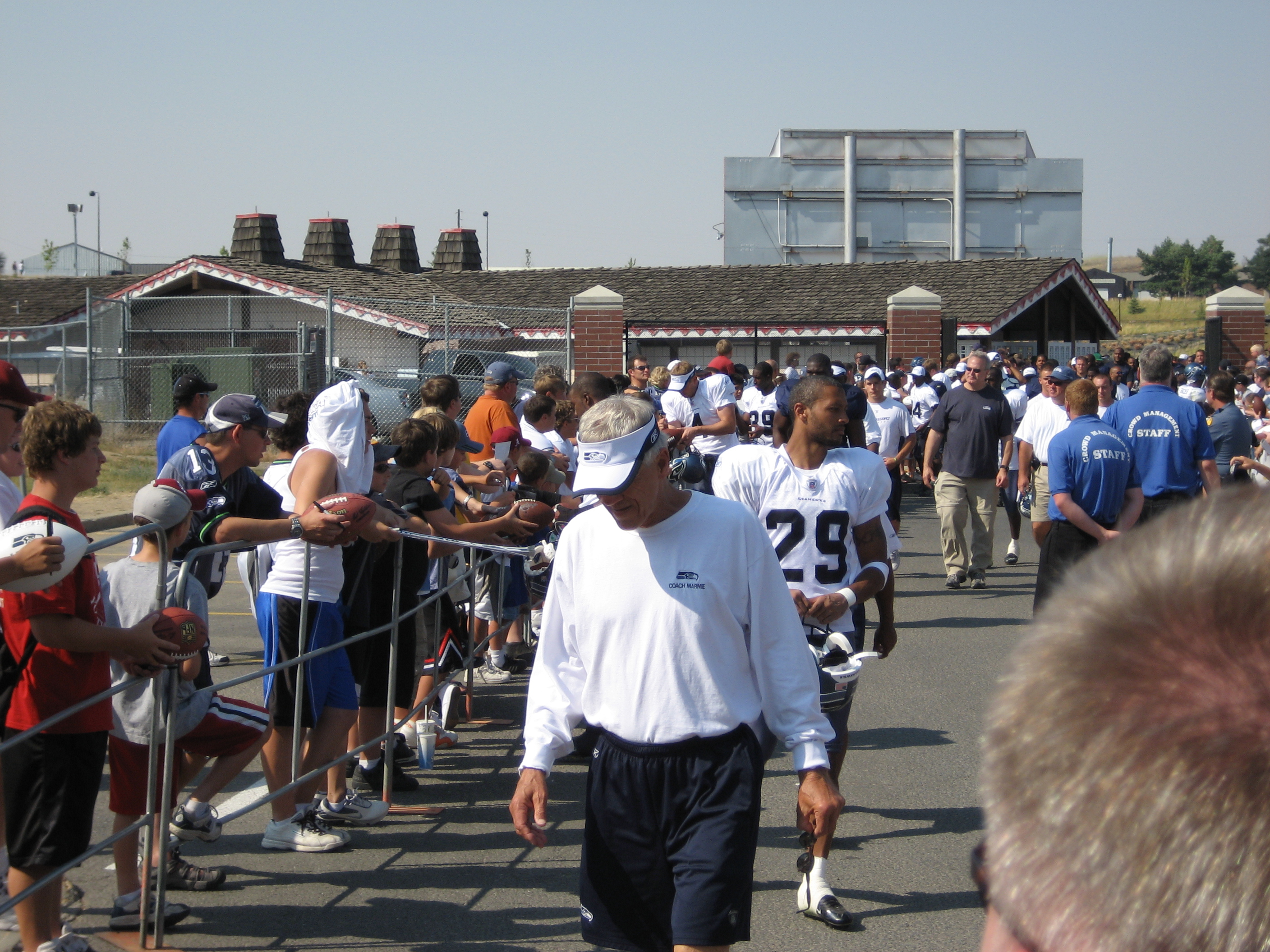
- Marmie with the Seattle Seahawks in 2006

Personal information
- Born: October 17, 1942 (age 84); Barnesville, Ohio, U.S.
- Listed height: 6 ft 1 in (1.85 m)
- Listed weight: 195 lb (88 kg)

Career information
- High school: Barnesville
- College: Eastern Kentucky

Career history
- Berea HS (KY) (1966–1967) Head coach; Morehead State (1968–1971) Defensive ends/linebackers coach; Eastern Kentucky (1972–1976) Defensive ends/linebackers coach; Tulsa (1977–1978) Assistant coach; North Carolina (1979–1982) Defensive backs coach; Tennessee (1983–1984) Defensive coordinator/inside linebackers coach; Arizona State (1985–1987) Defensive coordinator; Arizona State (1988–1991) Head coach; Tennessee (1992–1994) Defensive coordinator; Arizona Cardinals (1996–1999) Defensive backs coach; Arizona Cardinals (2000–2003) Defensive coordinator; St. Louis Rams (2004–2005) Defensive coordinator; Seattle Seahawks (2006–2008) Defensive backs coach; Las Vegas Locomotives (2010–2012) Defensive backs coach; Tampa Bay Buccaneers (2014–2015) Senior defensive assistant; San Diego Fleet (2019) Defensive coordinator

Awards and highlights
- UFL champion (2010)

Head coaching record
- Career: College: 22–21–1 (.511)
- Coaching profile at Pro Football Reference

Larry Marmie (born October 17, 1942) is an American football coach and former quarterback who has coached at the college level and in the National Football League (NFL).

He played college football for the Eastern Kentucky Colonels, having transferred after a season with the Ohio State Buckeyes.

Marmie served as the head football coach at Arizona State University from 1988 to 1991, compiling a record of 22–21–1. He served as a senior defensive assistant for the Tampa Bay Buccaneers under head coach Lovie Smith until 2015. In 2018, he became the defensive coordinator for the San Diego Fleet of the Alliance of American Football (AAF), serving under Mike Martz.

== Head coaching record ==
=== College ===
Year	Team	Overall	Conference	Standing	Bowl/playoffs
Arizona State Sun Devils (Pacific-10 Conference) (1988–1991)
1988	Arizona State	6–5	3–4	5th	
1989	Arizona State	6–4–1	3–3–1	5th	
1990	Arizona State	4–7	2–5	8th	
1991	Arizona State	6–5	4–4	5th	
Arizona State:		22–21–1	12–16–1		
Total:		22–21–1			
