= 1988 Oregon State Beavers football team =

American college football season

1988 Oregon State Beavers football
- Conference: Pacific-10 Conference
- Record: 4–6–1 (2–5–1 Pac-10)
- Head coach: Dave Kragthorpe (4th season)
- Defensive coordinator: Tim Hundley (5th season)
- Home stadium: Parker Stadium

1988 Pacific-10 Conference football standings
	Conf.					Overall
Team	W		L		T	W		L		T
No. 7 USC $	8	–	0	–	0	10	–	2	–	0
No. 6 UCLA	6	–	2	–	0	10	–	2	–	0
No. 16 Washington State	5	–	3	–	0	9	–	3	–	0
Arizona	5	–	3	–	0	7	–	4	–	0
Arizona State	3	–	4	–	0	6	–	5	–	0
Washington	3	–	5	–	0	6	–	5	–	0
Oregon	3	–	5	–	0	6	–	6	–	0
Oregon State	2	–	5	–	1	4	–	6	–	1
Stanford	1	–	5	–	2	3	–	6	–	2
California	1	–	5	–	1	5	–	5	–	1
$ – Conference champion; Rankings from AP Poll

The 1988 Oregon State Beavers football team represented Oregon State University in the 1988 NCAA Division I-A football season. The Beavers started the season 3–3–1, their best start in 20 years but lost all but one of their remaining games to post their 18th consecutive losing season. The Beavers' 4–6–1 record was their best record between 1971 and 1998.

== Schedule ==
Date	Opponent	Site	TV	Result	Attendance	Source
September 3	Arizona	Parker Stadium; Corvallis, OR		L 13–24	23,142	
September 10	at San Jose State*	Spartan Stadium; San Jose, CA		W 41–27	17,183	
September 17	California	Parker Stadium; Corvallis, OR		W 17–16	25,266	
September 24	at Colorado*	Folsom Field; Boulder, CO		L 21–28	41,297	
October 1	Fresno State*	Parker Stadium; Corvallis, OR		W 21–10	28,179	
October 8	at No. 2 UCLA	Rose Bowl; Pasadena, CA	KVAL	L 21–38	46,550	
October 22	at Stanford	Stanford Stadium; Stanford, CA		T 20–20	35,500	
October 29	No. 3 USC^{†}	Parker Stadium; Corvallis, OR		L 20–41	31,117	
November 5	at Arizona State	Sun Devil Stadium; Tempe, AZ		L 24–30	70,508	
November 12	at No. 20 Washington State	Martin Stadium; Pullman, WA		L 27–36	19,702	
November 19	Oregon	Parker Stadium; Corvallis, OR (Civil War)		W 21–10	40,597	
*Non-conference game; ^{†}Homecoming; Rankings from AP Poll released prior to the game

== Game summaries ==
=== Before the Season ===
Oregon State's quarterback, Erik Wilhelm, the Pac-10 leader in passing yards in 1987, returned for his senior season. The Beavers entered 1988 on a 6-game losing streak and an 11-game conference losing streak. In the past 71 conference games, Oregon State compiled a 6-63-2 record, a .099 winning percentage. The Beavers rushed for 518 total yards in 1987. Oregon State's offense had not rushed for 200 yards in a single game in almost four years, and Oregon State's defense had not allowed less than 26 points in a single game since a 1986 game against Brigham Young in Provo, Utah. The Beavers implemented the 3-4 defense in the offseason. For the first time since 1935, Washington did not appear on Oregon State's schedule. The Beavers only played the Ducks more often than the Huskies in that span.

=== Arizona ===
	1	2	3	4	Total
Wildcats	7	3	7	7	24
Beavers	0	10	3	0	13

Arizona entered the game two touchdown favorites. Oregon State rushed for two yards against the Wildcats in 1987, a 14-point loss. The Beavers' starting guard, Ken Felix, was injured in fall camp and did not play. The Wildcats took a 7-0 lead in the first quarter on quarterback, Ron Veal's six-yard run after an Oregon State fumble. The Beavers' Troy Bussanich cut the margin to four with a 25-yard field goal. Oregon State took the lead when Erik Wilhelm hit Jason Kent for a 44-yard touchdown pass on third-and eight. Backup quarterback, Bobby Watters, subsequently replaced Veal. He led Arizona to a game-tying score with a 31-yard field goal with 6:02 left in the first half, thanks in part to a roughing the passer penalty. After their third clipping penalty of the first half set them back to their own 9-yard line, the Beavers drove 65 yards in 4:55. The next play, a two-yard Brian Taylor run, sapped 37 seconds. After an incomplete pass, the Beavers were forced to use their last time out to avoid a penalty with 23 seconds left. On the next play, Erik Wilhelm suffered his only sack, an 11-yard loss. Bussanich subsequent 51-yard field goal attempt was far short as the first half expired.

Bussanich kicked a 20-yard field goal with 5:22 left in the third quarter. Watters immediately led Arizona on an 11-play, 67-yard touchdown drive, taking up most of the rest of the third quarter. On the ensuing kickoff, the Beavers successfully returned a kickoff without clipping for the first time all game. Oregon State drove inside the Wildcat red zone early in the fourth quarter, but Bussanich missed a 38-yard field goal a few inches to the left. On the Beavers' next drive, they drove to the Arizona 49, but tailback Trey Nicholson and fullback Brian Swanson were stopped short on third-and-one and fourth-and-one, respectively. Felix' backup, Paul Steffen failed to block Brad Hinke, who made the tackle on Swanson on fourth down. Five plays later, Watters clinched the win by running 25-yards for a touchdown with 2:24 left. Oregon State rushed for 200 yards for the first time since early in 1984. The Beavers only punted once, finishing with almost 17 more minutes in time of possession, 180 more yards, and 13 more first downs.

=== San Jose State ===
	1	2	3	4	Total
Beavers	7	17	10	7	41
Spartans	7	9	3	8	27

In their previous 20 regular season games, the Spartans only loss was a 36-34 loss to the Beavers in Corvallis in 1987. San Jose State sought to pay back Oregon State. The Beavers made their first ever trip to San Jose. On the game's opening drive, San Jose State drove to the Oregon State one-yard line but turned the ball over on downs. Beaver running back, Brian Taylor ran for a 70-yard touchdown the first time he touched the football. Oregon State built a 24-19 third quarter lead. On third-and-six, Wilhelm hit Reggie Hubbard for an 18-yard touchdown and 31-19 Beaver lead. On their first play, the Spartans' John Johnson was stripped by Oregon State. The Beavers' Andre Harris recovered to set up a 38-yard Bussanich field goal and 34-19 lead. San Jose State stopped Oregon State's next drive, but, on fourth down at the Spartan 37, Wilhelm, who lined up as a blocking back, took the snap and hit Lloyd Bailey for a touchdown and 41-19 fourth quarter lead. Less than two-and-a-half minutes later, San Jose State scored a touchdown and two-point conversion to pull within 14. Harris added two fourth quarter interceptions to his third-quarter fumble recovery. However, the Beaver win was not secured until he came up with another strip and recovered the fumble at the Oregon State 30 with 1:22 left. The Beavers ended their seven-game losing streak and won their first road game since a 10-7 win over Brigham Young in Provo in 1986. Oregon State wouldnt return to San Jose again until 2023.

=== California ===
	1	2	3	4	Total
Golden Bears	7	3	6	0	16
Beavers	3	0	0	14	17

Oregon State entered the game on a 12-game conference losing streak but a three-game winning streak against California, as the two teams did not play in 1987. The game was the Beavers' first against long-time Pac-10 coach Bruce Snyder. The clock used in Beaver home games had a tendency to malfunction and in fact had malfunctioned in a high school game the night before the California-Oregon State game. The Beavers' Andre Harris recovered a first-quarter fumble at the Oregon State 35 and drove 63 yards in almost six minutes before settling for Bussanich's 23-yard field goal. California's Darrin Greer returned the following kickoff to the Beaver 40, setting up a 40-yard Bear touchdown drive. An 18-yard punt in the second quarter gave California the ball again at the Beaver 40. The Bears drove 30 yards before settling on kicker/punter Robbie Keen's 27-yard field goal.

California tacked on two third-quarter field goals and Bussanich responded with a 21-yard field goal early in the fourth quarter to cut the Bears' lead to 10. Then, it happened. Keen, lined up to punt with 10:12 left. By the time the play was over, the clock read 10:99. When Oregon State ran its first offensive play after the punt, the clock read 10:59. A few fans noticed the glitch but no one on California's coaching staff did. With seven-and-a-half minutes left, Wilhelm threw his first interception of the year to the Bears' John Hardy at the California one. Hardy returned the interception to the Beaver 49. The Bears drove into field goal range. Keen, having hit three field goals without a miss lined up for the kick. Dewey Tucker, a backup nose guard, managed to block the kick at the Oregon State 31 with 4:17 left to preserve a 10-point deficit. The Beavers drove to the California 26, but Brian Taylor was stopped at fourth-and-one. The fans began streaming towards the exits but Bruce Sanders forced a fumble on the next play, which Tom Vettrus recovered at the Bear 25 with 2:37 left. Oregon State drove to the three, and Wilhelm hit Brian Taylor for a three-yard touchdown pass with less than two minutes left that California cornerback Doug Parrish narrowly missed. Wilhelm again picked on Parrish, hitting Brian Swanson for the two-point conversion. The Beavers, with the wind and two timeouts, shunned an onside kick, opting to kick it deep. Sanders sacked Bear quarterback Troy Taylor at the 11 on third down, necessitating a California punt. Keen's punt against the wind only traveled 33 yards and Reggie Hubbard returned the punt to the California 37 with 45 seconds left. On third-and-six, Wilhelm hit Swanson for a 21-yard gain to the Bear six with 26 seconds left. Oregon State centered the ball and California called timeout. Bussanich, aided by the timeout, responded by kicking a 23-yard field goal with 16 seconds left to win the game. Dave Kragthorpe improved to 6-0 in games decided by four points or fewer. After the game ended, the Bears noticed that the fifth minute of the fourth quarter had been played twice. Snyder complained bitterly after the game. The 2004 California media guide still referred to the 17-16 Beaver win as the "Infamous 61-Minute Game". Many Oregon State fans refer to the game alternatively as "Beaver in the Sky".

=== Colorado ===
	1	2	3	4	Total
Beavers	7	0	7	7	21
Buffaloes	13	3	0	12	28

Colorado entered 18-point favorites. In the first quarter, Colorado faced fourth-and-one on Oregon State's 45-yard line. Instead of a punt, the Buffaloes called an option play that Eric Bienemy turned into a 45-yard touchdown scamper. The Beavers responded with a nine-play, 80-yard touchdown drive, capped off by Wilhelm's 48-yard pass to Jason Kent, to knot the score at seven. Colorado's Sal Aunese only completed six passes all day, but five came in the first half, including his two longest, a 67-yard pass that set up a field goal and a 52-yard pass to set up a second Bienemy touchdown. The Buffaloes' two-point conversion attempt failed. Thus, the two scores only gave Colorado a 16-7 lead. Just before halftime, Oregon State seemed poised to cut into the Buffalo lead, but Bussanich's 36-yard field goal sailed wide right.

In the second half, an Aunese fumble set up Wilhelm's 24-yard touchdown pass to Robb Thomas. The Beavers' Brian Taylor finished six inches out of the end zone on a subsequent second half drive, but Brian Swanson ran in from one-yard out on a fourth quarter drive to give Oregon State a 21-16 lead with just over 11:04 left. Less than two minutes later, the Buffaloes retook the lead on Bienemy's third touchdown, a 66-yard touchdown run with 9:16 left. The Beavers' final drive petered out in Colorado territory, and Oregon State's punter, Mark Bennett pinned Colorado at their own five yard line. After the Buffaloes first two plays netted a single yard, Aunese completed his only second half pass for 19 yards to extend the drive. Aunese capped off Colorado's subsequent drive, rushing for an 11-yard touchdown with no time left, giving the Buffaloes a 28-21 win. Wilhelm completed 27 of 38 passes for 353 yards, two touchdowns, and no interceptions. Thomas caught ten of the passes for 147 yards.

=== Fresno State ===
	1	2	3	4	Total
Bulldogs	0	3	7	0	10
Beavers	0	7	7	7	21

In the 23 seasons from 1981 to 2003, Oregon State and Fresno State played 13 times, more than three times more often than any other nonconference opponent in the same period. The Beavers won the first meeting 31-28 in the largest comeback ever, at the time. The Bulldogs won the next two and Oregon State looked to even the series. Jim Sweeney, coach of Fresno State was no stranger to Oregon State, having coached Washington State from 1968 to 1975. Wilhelm threw for 215 yards and two touchdowns. The 215 yards gave Wilhelm 7,821 career passing yards, surpassing both Jack Thompson's and Jim Plunkett's career totals, leaving Wilhelm within striking distance of John Elway's 9,350 career passing yards, the most prolific passer in Pac-10 history at the time. The Beavers' 3-2 start was their best since 1970, their last winning season.

=== UCLA ===
	1	2	3	4	Total
Beavers	0	14	0	7	21
Bruins	14	7	3	14	38

UCLA entered the game 27-point favorites. In the first 19 minutes, Oregon State failed to make a first down, while the Bruins scored touchdowns on their first three drives, two ending on Troy Aikman touchdown passes. Wilhelm responded by throwing a 69-yard touchdown pass of his own to Pat Chaffey. On an ensuing drive, Pellom McDaniels forced an Aikman fumble, which Oregon State's Ray Giacomelli recovers. Three plays later, Wilhelm threw his second touchdown pass, a 52-yard strike to Robb Thomas, with 2:19 left in the first half.

In the second half, UCLA tacked on a field goal. The Beavers countered by driving into Bruin territory. Wilhelm threw a seven-yard pass to Phil Ross, but the pass was high and it deflected off of Ross' shoulder pads and was intercepted. Aikman responded by throwing an interception that was tipped by cornerback Calvin Nicholson to safety. On the ensuing Beaver drive, Brian Taylor fumbled. UCLA took the fumble and drove for a touchdown, another Aikman touchdown pass. The Beavers immediately responded by driving for a touchdown, capped by Wilhelm throwing another touchdown pass to Thomas with seven minutes left, but Aikman threw his fourth touchdown pass with 20 seconds left for a 38-21 Bruin win. Aikman finished completing 24 of 36 passes for 288 yards, four touchdowns, and two interceptions. Wilhelm finished completing 28 of 48 passes for 309 yards, three touchdowns, and an interception. Wilhelm also outrushed Aikman by 19 yards. Thomas finished catching nine passes for 161 yards and two touchdowns. The Trojans defeated the Bruins to claim the Pac-10's Rose Bowl berth. Aikman finished third in the Heisman balloting behind Barry Sanders and Southern California's Rodney Peete, but Aikman won the Davey O'Brien Trophy. UCLA wound up beating #8 Arkansas, the Southwest Conference champion, 17-3 in the Cotton Bowl in Dallas, Texas. The Dallas media championed Aikman as the Cowboys' next quarterback. Dallas subsequently made Aikman the first overall pick in the 1989 NFL Draft.

=== Stanford ===
	1	2	3	4	Total
Beavers	7	7	3	3	20
Cardinal	0	3	7	10	20

Oregon State and Stanford each entered the game 3-3. The Cardinal had held a fourth quarter lead over both the undefeated Trojans and the Ducks, whose only defeat was at the hands of the Trojans. However, Stanford lost both games by four points. The Cardinal's only other loss came at the hands of undefeated Notre Dame, on its way to a national championship. The Beavers built a 14-0 first half lead on a four-yard Brian Taylor touchdown scamper and a three-yard pass from Wilhelm to Bryant Hill. Stanford narrowed Oregon State's lead to 17-13 on John Hopkins' 28-yard field goal with 7:34 left in the game and took the lead on a 75-yard Jason Palumbis to John Pinckney strike with 2:33 left. The Beavers drove 65 yards to the Cardinal four, before being pushed back to the eight. On fourth down, with nine seconds left, Oregon State opted for a 26-yard field goal attempt, which Bussanich converted. The tie was the Beavers best result in Stanford, California in between 1968 and 1998. Oregon State's 3-3-1 record was the Beavers' best start in 20 years.

=== Southern California ===
	1	2	3	4	Total
Trojans	14	3	3	21	41
Beavers	0	7	7	6	20

Southern California was undefeated and ranked #3 in the nation, off to its best start in 13 years. The Trojans hopped out to a 14-0 lead in the first seven minutes, before Oregon State could manage a single first down. The Beavers drove into Trojan territory twice, but Oregon State failed to score on either drive. Brian Taylor fumbled on a pitchout at the Trojan 21 and Bussanich missed a 43-yard field goal. Southern California's Quin Rodriguez kicked a 42-yard field goal, but Wilhelm found Robb Thomas on a seven-yard touchdown pass to cut the Trojan lead to 10 just before halftime.

Rodriguez added a second field goal to open the second half. Wilhelm found Thomas again for a 53-yard pass on 2nd-and-25. Moments later, Lloyd Bailey made a diving catch for a three-yard touchdown to cut Southern California's lead to 20-14. Just before the third quarter ended, Wilhelm's pass to Thomas was intercepted at the Trojan 23. On the first play of the fourth quarter, Southern California's Rodney Peete was hit by blitzing safety as Peete was letting go of the ball. Oregon State's Mike Matthews made a diving interception to give the Beavers the ball at their own 32. However, Wilhelm subsequently threw his third interception. Four plays later, the Trojans' Leroy Holt broke four tackles on a 28-yard touchdown carry to put Southern California on top 26-14 with 13:41 left. A few minutes later, Oregon State's David Brannon appeared in position to make an interception, but Erik Affholter managed to tip the ball away from Brannon and make an acrobatic catch, running into the end zone for a 55-yard touchdown pass to put the Trojans up 34-14 with 11:09 left. After Affholter's third touchdown reception, the teams traded touchdowns, making the final a 41-20 Southern California win. Wilhelm finished throwing 37 for 62, both Pac-10 records for completions and attempts. The 62 pass attempts would remain a Pac-10 and Pac-12 record until 2011. The Beavers wound up with 470 yards, 145 yards more than any other team had managed against the Trojans. Wilhelm's 418 total yards gave him 8,482 total career yards, the second most ever in the Pac-10, behind John Elway's 9,070 with three games remaining.

=== Arizona State ===
	1	2	3	4	Total
Beavers	7	14	3	0	24
Sun Devils	7	0	0	23	30

In the first half, Oregon State's Billy Hughley blocked a 32-yard Arizona State field goal to preserve a 7-7 tie. In the second quarter, the Devils' starting quarterback, Paul Justin was knocked out of the game by Oregon State's Ray Giacomelli and was replaced by Daniel Ford. The Beavers built a 21-7 halftime lead on a one-yard Wilhelm run and an eight-yard pass from Wilhelm to Robb Thomas on a tipped pass with 12 seconds left in the first half.

In their first drive of the second half, Oregon State's Troy Bussanich kicked a 44-yard field goal to take a 24-7 lead with 9:44 left in the third quarter. 13 seconds into the fourth quarter, Ford threw a touchdown pass to pull Arizona State within 10. The Devils' next drive lasted 15 seconds, a 65-yard Ford touchdown pass, but Ford's two-point conversion attempt fell incomplete, which kept the Beavers up by four. Brian Swanson fumbled with 7:06 left in the game, and Arizona State took the lead with a touchdown 10 seconds later. Wilhelm fumbled on Oregon State's next offensive play. The Devils converted the fumble into a 30-yard field goal to take a 30-24 lead. The Beavers responded by driving to the Arizona State 35, but, with 1:04 left, Wilhelm was intercepted to effectively end the game. Kragthorpe closed the locker room after the game for the first time since becoming coach.

=== Washington State ===
	1	2	3	4	Total
Beavers	0	6	8	13	27
Cougars	7	19	3	7	36

Washington State had not played in a bowl game since 1981 and had not won a bowl game since 1916. The Cougars started off the year winning their first three road games against Illinois by 37, Minnesota by 32, and Tennessee by 28. Two weeks before playing Oregon State, Washington State upset #1 UCLA by four in the Rose Bowl. Although the Cougars enjoyed success on the road, they had lost two of three at home to start the season. Despite that fact, Dennis Erickson and Washington State entered one game away from all-but wrapping up an Aloha Bowl bid. Oregon State had not faced an Erickson-coached team since splitting with Idaho in 1984 and 1985. During the game, the temperature never exceeded 50 degrees with a 15-20 mph breeze.

The Cougars led 26-6 at halftime and 36-14 in the fourth quarter. The Beavers managed two fourth-quarter touchdowns to pull within nine before the final gun sounded. Wilhelm finished 26 of 46 for 274 yards, pulling him within 13 yards of John Elway's Pac-10 passing record and 16 yards of John Elways' Pac-10 total yardage record. Wilhelm's 274 yards was his 30th 200-yard passing game, a Pac-10 record. Washington State secured the Aloha Bowl berth with a win over Washington to end the season. The Cougars won the Aloha Bowl over Houston 24-22. After the season ended, Erickson quit as Washington State's head coach to become the head coach of the Miami Hurricanes. After stints with the Hurricanes and Seattle Seahawks, Erickson became the head coach of Oregon State in 1999.

=== Oregon ===
Oregon at Oregon State

Team	1	2	3	4	Total
Oregon	3	7	0	0	10
• Oregon St	7	0	0	14	21

- Date: Saturday, November 19
- Location: Parker Stadium, Corvallis, Oregon
- Game weather: Rain
- Source: Eugene Register-Guard

Scoring summary
1	12:18	ORST	Taylor 27-yard run (Bussanich kick)	ORST 7-0
1	7:16	ORE	Dennis 22-yard field goal	ORST 7-3
2	4:18	ORE	Loville 12-yard run (Dennis kick)	ORE 10-7
4	8:13	ORST	Chaffey 2-yard run (Bussanich kick)	ORST 14-10
4	1:30	ORST	Chaffey 17-yard run (Bussanich kick)	ORST 21-10

External videos
- Civil War Flashback – 1988

Oregon State had not beaten Oregon since 1974. The Ducks' coach, Rich Brooks, an Oregon State graduate, had amassed a 19-0-1 record in his 20 years as a player and coach. The Ducks' quarterback was Bob Brothers, son of the Beavers' former quarterback, Paul Brothers, who had led Oregon State to its last Rose Bowl. Oregon's last four wins in the Civil War had come by an average of almost four touchdowns. The game was played in a tremendous downpour. On their first possession, the Beavers' Brian Taylor ran 27 yards for a touchdown and a 7-0 lead. The Ducks scored a field goal and a touchdown to post a 10-7 halftime lead.

In the second half, Oregon did not pass the Oregon State 36-yard line. Wilhelm needed 14 yards to pass Elway, but he did not get those 14 yards until he hit Bryant Hill for a 32-yard pass in the fourth quarter. After converting a fourth down with a two-yard run earlier in the same drive, Pat Chaffey scored on a two-yard run with just over eight minutes left. Later in the fourth quarter, the Beavers' intercepted Bob Brothers' pass and returned it to the Duck 32 yard line to set up Chaffey's second touchdown to seal the win. Chaffey finished with 109 yards on 24 carries. Oregon State fans rushed the field to tear down both goal posts. Wilhelm's 57 yards passing gave him 9,393 career passing yards, most ever in the Pac-10. However, the Ducks sacked Wilhelm five times, leaving Wilhelm with eight total yards, eight yards short of John Elway's total yardage record.

=== After the Civil War ===
Oregon State's 4-6-1 record was their best between their 5-6 records in 1971 and 1998. The Pac-10 was particularly strong in 1988, finishing 29-7 (.806) against non-conference competition. Each loss was against a team that was ranked for a part of the year.

== Team players drafted into the NFL ==
Player	Position	Round	Pick	NFL club
Erik Wilhelm	Quarterback	3	83	Cincinnati Bengals
Robb Thomas	Wide receiver	6	143	Kansas City Chiefs
Calvin Nicholson	Defensive back	11	300	New Orleans Saints
