= Chris Dyko =

American football player (1966–2014)

Christopher Edward Dyko
No. 68, 77, 53
- Position: Offensive tackle

Personal information
- Born: March 16, 1966; Champaign, Illinois, U.S.
- Died: December 28, 2014 (aged 48); Florida Keys, U.S.
- Listed height: 6 ft 6 in (1.98 m)
- Listed weight: 305 lb (138 kg)

Career information
- High school: University (Spokane Valley, Washington)
- College: Washington State
- NFL draft: 1989: 8th round, 221st overall pick

Career history
- Chicago Bears (1989); Seattle Seahawks (1990); New York/New Jersey Knights (1992); New York Giants (1992)*; Sacramento Gold Miners (1993–1994); Birmingham Barracudas (1995)
- * Offseason or practice squad member only

Awards and highlights
- Second-team All-Pac-10 (1988)

Career NFL statistics
- Games played: 8
- Games started: 1
- Stats at Pro Football Reference

Christopher Edward Dyko (March 16, 1966 – December 28, 2014) was an American professional football player who was a tackle for eight games, starting once, with the Chicago Bears of the National Football League (NFL). He later signed with the New York Giants, playing for the New York/New Jersey Knights, and also played in the Canadian Football League (CFL).

Dyko played college football for the Washington State Cougars in Pullman under head coaches Jim Walden and Dennis Erickson. In his senior season in 1988, the Cougars won the Aloha Bowl and finished with a 9–3 record. He was selected by the Bears in the eighth round of the 1989 NFL draft.

== Post-football career ==
Dyko received a Master of Education degree from WSU in 1996. He was employed by the American Military University online learning institution as its northwest regional coordinator and was an adjunct professor.

== Death ==
On December 28, 2014, while riding his bicycle in the Florida Keys, Dyko was struck and killed in a hit and run incident.
