= 1988 Stanford Cardinal football team =

American college football season

1988 Stanford Cardinal football
- Conference: Pacific-10 Conference
- Record: 3–6–2 (1–5–2 Pac-10)
- Head coach: Jack Elway (5th season)
- Offensive scheme: West Coast
- Defensive coordinator: Dick Mannini (5th season)
- Base defense: 4–3
- Home stadium: Stanford Stadium

1988 Pacific-10 Conference football standings
	Conf.					Overall
Team	W		L		T	W		L		T
No. 7 USC $	8	–	0	–	0	10	–	2	–	0
No. 6 UCLA	6	–	2	–	0	10	–	2	–	0
No. 16 Washington State	5	–	3	–	0	9	–	3	–	0
Arizona	5	–	3	–	0	7	–	4	–	0
Arizona State	3	–	4	–	0	6	–	5	–	0
Washington	3	–	5	–	0	6	–	5	–	0
Oregon	3	–	5	–	0	6	–	6	–	0
Oregon State	2	–	5	–	1	4	–	6	–	1
Stanford	1	–	5	–	2	3	–	6	–	2
California	1	–	5	–	1	5	–	5	–	1
$ – Conference champion; Rankings from AP Poll

The 1988 Stanford Cardinal football team represented Stanford University as a member of the Pacific-10 Conference (Pac-10) during the 1988 NCAA Division I-A football season. Led by Jack Elway in his fifth and final season as head coach, the Cardinal compiled an overall record of 3–6–2 with a mark of 1–5–2 in conference play, placing ninth in the Pac-10. The team played home games at Stanford Stadium in Stanford, California.

Elwaywas fired following the season and succeeded by Dennis Green.

== Schedule ==
Date	Time	Opponent	Site	TV	Result	Attendance	Source
September 10	12:30 p.m.	No. 8 USC	Stanford Stadium; Stanford, CA (rivalry)	ABC	L 20–24	59,000	
September 17	1:00 p.m.	San Diego State*	Stanford Stadium; Stanford, CA		W 31–10	26,000	
September 24	1:00 p.m.	at No. 22 Oregon	Autzen Stadium; Eugene, OR (rivalry)		L 3–7	39,089	
October 1	4:00 p.m.	at No. 5 Notre Dame*	Notre Dame Stadium; Notre Dame, IN (rivalry)	ESPN	L 14–42	59,075	
October 8	1:00 p.m.	San Jose State*	Stanford Stadium; Stanford, CA (rivalry)		W 44–12	55,000	
October 15	1:00 p.m.	Arizona State	Stanford Stadium; Stanford, CA		W 24–3	40,500	
October 22	1:00 p.m.	Oregon State	Stanford Stadium; Stanford, CA		T 20–20	35,500	
October 29	12:30 p.m.	at Washington	Husky Stadium; Seattle, WA		L 25–28	68,272	
November 5	1:00 p.m.	Washington State	Stanford Stadium; Stanford, CA		L 21–24	36,500	
November 12	12:30 p.m.	at No. 6 UCLA	Rose Bowl; Pasadena, CA (rivalry)		L 17–27	70,552	
November 19	1:00 p.m.	at California	California Memorial Stadium; Berkeley, CA (Big Game)		T 19–19	75,662	
*Non-conference game; Rankings from AP Poll released prior to the game; All times are in Pacific time

== Game summaries ==
=== At California ===
Stanford Cardinal (3–6–1) at California Golden Bears (5–5)

Quarter	1	2	3	4	Total
Stanford	3	10	3	3	19
California	3	9	0	7	19

at California Memorial Stadium, Berkeley, California

- Date: November 19
- Game time: 1:00 p.m.
- Game attendance: 75,662

Game information

First quarter

- CAL - Robbie Keen 36-yard field goal. California 3–0. Drive:
- STAN – John Hopkins 44-yard field goal. Tie 3–3. Drive:

Second quarter

- STAN – John Hopkins 46-yard field goal. Stanford 6–3. Drive:
- CAL – Robbie Keen 44-yard field goal. Tie 6–6. Drive:
- CAL – Robbie Keen 39-yard field goal. California 9–6. Drive:
- STAN – Kevin Scott 95-yard kickoff return (John Hopkins kick), 2:35. Stanford 13–9.
- CAL – Robbie Keen 21-yard field goal. Stanford 13–12. Drive:

Third quarter

- STAN – John Hopkins 21-yard field goal. Stanford 16–12. Drive: 71 yards.

Fourth quarter

- STAN – John Hopkins 21-yard field goal. Stanford 19–12. Drive:
- CAL – Mike Ford 19-yard pass from Troy Taylor (Robbie Keen kick), 9:08. Tie 19–19. Drive: 80 yards.

Top passers

- STAN – Jason Palumbis – 13/27, 181 yards, int
- CAL – Troy Taylor – 18/32, 226 yards, TD

Top rushers

- STAN – Jon Volpe – 23 rushes, 56 yards
- CAL – Todd Powers – 9 rushes, 55 yards

Top receivers

- STAN – Walter Batson – 2 receptions, 60 yards
- CAL – Rob Bimson – 5 receptions, 48 yards

Stanford's Tuan Van Le, a Vietnam War refugee, blocked Robbie Keen's 20-yard field goal in the final seconds to preserve the tie.

== Personnel ==
1988 Stanford Cardinal football team roster
Players
Coaches
Offense

Pos.	#	Name	Class
WR		Walter Batson
RB		Scott Eschelman
QB	12	Jason Palumbis	Fr
WR		Jon Pinckney
C		Andy Sinclair
RB		Tommy Vardell	Fr
RB		Jon Volpe	So
SB		Chris Walsh	Fr
WR		Charlie Young

Defense

Pos.	#	Name	Class
DT	72	Lester Archambeau	Sr
S		Robert Engelhardt
DB		Alan Grant
LB		Rob Hinckley
NG		Ray Huckestein
DL		Scott Palmbush
ILB		Kevin Richardson	Sr
DB		Kevin Scott
LB		Jono Tunney
CB		Tuan Van Le	RFr

Special teams

Pos.	#	Name	Class
K		John Hopkins

Head coach

- Jack Elway

Coordinators/assistant coaches

- Dave Baldwin – Passing game coordinator and wide receivers
- Gary Gagnon – Running backs
- Chris Foerster – Assistant offensive line
- Dick Mannini – Defensive coordinator and defensive line
- Larry Kerr – Inside linebackers
- Otto Kofler – Outside linebackers
- Jack Gilmete – Outside linebackers
- Sonny Lubick – Defensive backs

Legend

- (C) Team captain
- (S) Suspended
- (I) Ineligible
- Injured
- Redshirt

== Radio ==
Flagship station	Play–by–play	Color commentator	Sideline reporter	Studio host
KSFO–AM 560				

Some games broadcast on KYA–FM 93.3 because of broadcast conflict with the Oakland Athletics
