= Greg Clark (linebacker) =

American football player (born 1965)

No. 58, 51, 92, 55, 59
- Position: Linebacker

Personal information
- Born: March 5, 1965 (age 61); Los Angeles, California, U.S.
- Listed height: 6 ft 0 in (1.83 m)
- Listed weight: 228 lb (103 kg)

Career information
- High school: North (Torrance, California)
- College: Arizona State
- NFL draft: 1988: 12thth round, 329th overall pick

Career history
- Chicago Bears (1988); Miami Dolphins (1989); Green Bay Packers (1990)*; Los Angeles Rams (1990); Green Bay Packers (1991); San Diego Chargers (1991); Seattle Seahawks (1992); Pittsburgh Steelers (1993)*; Winnipeg Blue Bombers (1993–1996); Saskatchewan Roughriders (1997)
- * Offseason or practice squad member only

Awards and highlights
- First-team All-Pac-10 (1987)

Career NFL statistics
- Fumble recoveries: 2
- Stats at Pro Football Reference

Gregory Klondike Clark (born March 5, 1965) is an American former professional football player who was a linebacker in the National Football League (NFL) and Canadian Football League (CFL). He played college football for the Arizona State Sun Devils.

== Biography ==
Clark was born on March 5, 1965, in Los Angeles, California.

He played prep football for North Torrance High, where in his senior year his team made it to the CIF final game. He played for Arizona State 1984–1987.

== Career ==
Clark was selected in the twelfth round of the 1988 NFL draft by the Chicago Bears and spent his first season with the team. The next two seasons he spent with the Miami Dolphins and the Los Angeles Rams. He split the 1991 NFL season between the San Diego Chargers and the Green Bay Packers before spending his final season with the Seattle Seahawks.

He played at the collegiate level at Arizona State University.
