= Tony Zackery =

American football player (born 1966)

No. 32, 25
- Position: Defensive back

Personal information
- Born: November 20, 1966 (age 59); Seattle, Washington, U.S.
- Listed height: 6 ft 2 in (1.88 m)
- Listed weight: 195 lb (88 kg)

Career information
- High school: Franklin (Seattle)
- College: Washington
- NFL draft: 1989: 8th round, 223rd overall pick

Career history
- New England Patriots (1989)*; Atlanta Falcons (1989); New England Patriots (1990–1991); Cleveland Browns (1992)*; Albany Firebirds (1993)
- * Offseason or practice squad member only

Career NFL statistics
- Interceptions: 1
- Fumble recoveries: 1
- Stats at Pro Football Reference

Anthony Eugene Zackery (born November 20, 1966) is an American former professional football player who was a cornerback in the National Football League (NFL). He played college football for the Washington Huskies and was selected by the New England Patriots in the eighth round in the 1989 NFL draft with the 223rd overall pick. He played for both the NFL's Atlanta Falcons and Patriots.

== Early life ==
Zackery attended Franklin High School in Seattle, Washington.

== College career ==
Zackery played for the Huskies at the University of Washington from 1985 to 1988 for coach Don James.
