= Ricky Andrews =

Samoan gridiron football player (born 1966)

No. 52, 58, 91
- Position: Linebacker

Personal information
- Born: April 14, 1966 (age 60); Western Samoa
- Listed height: 6 ft 2 in (1.88 m)
- Listed weight: 236 lb (107 kg)

Career information
- High school: University (Honolulu, Hawaii, U.S.)
- College: Washington
- NFL draft: 1989: 10th round, 260th overall pick

Career history
- San Diego Chargers (1989)*; Seattle Seahawks (1990); Orlando Thunder (1992); New York Jets (1992)*; Baltimore (1994); Scottish Claymores (1995); Rhein Fire (1996)
- * Offseason or practice squad member only
- Stats at Pro Football Reference

Richard Guy Andrews (born April 14, 1966) is a Samoan former professional American football player who was a linebacker in the National Football League (NFL), Canadian Football League (CFL), and World League of American Football (WLAF).

== Professional career ==
=== San Diego Chargers ===
Andrews was selected by the San Diego Chargers in the tenth round (260th overall) of the 1989 NFL draft.

=== Seattle Seahawks ===
Andrews played in 15 games in the 1990 season.

== See also ==
- Washington Huskies football statistical leaders
