= 1988 Oregon Ducks football team =

American college football season

1988 Oregon Ducks football
- Conference: Pacific-10 Conference
- Record: 6–6 (3–5 Pac-10)
- Head coach: Rich Brooks (12th season)
- Offensive coordinator: Bob Toledo (6th season)
- Offensive scheme: I formation
- Defensive coordinator: Denny Schuler (3rd season)
- Base defense: 5–2
- Captains: Bill Musgrave; Matt Brock; Thom Kaumeyer
- Home stadium: Autzen Stadium

1988 Pacific-10 Conference football standings
	Conf.					Overall
Team	W		L		T	W		L		T
No. 7 USC $	8	–	0	–	0	10	–	2	–	0
No. 6 UCLA	6	–	2	–	0	10	–	2	–	0
No. 16 Washington State	5	–	3	–	0	9	–	3	–	0
Arizona	5	–	3	–	0	7	–	4	–	0
Arizona State	3	–	4	–	0	6	–	5	–	0
Washington	3	–	5	–	0	6	–	5	–	0
Oregon	3	–	5	–	0	6	–	6	–	0
Oregon State	2	–	5	–	1	4	–	6	–	1
Stanford	1	–	5	–	2	3	–	6	–	2
California	1	–	5	–	1	5	–	5	–	1
$ – Conference champion; Rankings from AP Poll

The 1988 Oregon Ducks football team represented the University of Oregon during the 1988 NCAA Division I-A football season. Playing as a member of the Pacific-10 Conference (Pac-10), the team was led by head coach Rich Brooks, in his twelfth year, and played their home games at Autzen Stadium in Eugene, Oregon. They finished the season with a record of six wins and six losses (6–6 overall, 3–5 in the Pac-10).

== Schedule ==
Date	Time	Opponent	Rank	Site	TV	Result	Attendance	Source
September 10	1:00 pm	Long Beach State*		Autzen Stadium; Eugene, OR		W 49–0	29,238	
September 17	2:00 pm	at Washington State		Martin Stadium; Pullman, WA		W 43–28	30,263	
September 24	1:00 pm	Stanford		Autzen Stadium; Eugene, OR (rivalry)		W 7–3	39,089	
October 1	7:00 pm	at San Diego State*	No. 20	Jack Murphy Stadium; San Diego, CA	KEZI	W 34–13	22,527	
October 8	1:30 pm	at No. 3 USC	No. 18	Los Angeles Memorial Coliseum; Los Angeles, CA (rivalry)		L 14–42	63,452	
October 15	1:00 pm	Idaho State*		Autzen Stadium; Eugene, OR		W 52–7	28,015	
October 22	1:00 pm	No. 17 Washington		Autzen Stadium; Eugene, OR (rivalry)		W 17–14	45,978	
October 29	1:00 pm	Arizona State	No. 20	Autzen Stadium; Eugene, OR		L 20–21	34,588	
November 5	12:30 pm	No. 6 UCLA		Autzen Stadium; Eugene, OR	ABC	L 6–16	42,509	
November 12	5:30 pm	at Arizona		Arizona Stadium; Tucson, AZ	KEZI	L 27–41	40,367	
November 19	1:00 pm	at Oregon State		Parker Stadium; Corvallis OR (Civil War)		L 10–21	40,597	
December 3	9:00 pm	at Hawaii*		Aloha Stadium; Halawa, HI	KEZI	L 17–41	44,801	
*Non-conference game; Rankings from AP Poll released prior to the game; All times are in Pacific time

== Roster ==
1988 Oregon Ducks football team roster
Players
Coaches
Offense

Pos.	#	Name	Class
WR		Sam Archer
RB		Dondre Bausley
RB		Latin Berry
OL		Scot Boatright
QB		Bob Brothers
OL		Curt Dykes
OL		Gary Gilbert
WR		Tony Hargain
OL		Rick Hunt
OL		Chris Husko
RB		Brandon Jumper
OL		Todd Kaanapu
OL		Todd Kunzman
RB		Russell Lawson
RB		Derek Loville
TE		Joe Meerten
QB		Bill Musgrave
QB		Pete Nelson
WR		Terry Obee
QB		Joe Okken
WR		Joe Reitzug
RB		Kerrell Robinson
OL		Andy Sunia
RB		Johnny Taylor
TE		Kolya Teft
RB		Randy Willhite

Defense

Pos.	#	Name	Class
LB		Leroy Ale
LB		Peter Brantley
DL		Matt Brock
DL		David Cusano
DB		Rory Dairy
DL		Devinn FitzPatrick
DB		Derek Horton
DB		Thom Kaumeyer
LB		Mark Kearns
LB		Scott Kozak
DB		Chris Oldham
DB		Daryl Reed
DL		Joe Taylor
LB		Scott Whitney
DB		Mark Winn
DB		Brett Young

Special teams

Pos.	#	Name	Class
K		Kirk Dennis
P		Ted Milburn

Head coach

- Rich Brooks

Coordinators/assistant coaches

- Bob Toledo

Legend

- (C) Team captain
- (S) Suspended
- (I) Ineligible
- Injured
- Redshirt
