= C. J. Davis (wide receiver) =

Canadian football player (born 1969)

No. 75
- Position: Wide receiver

Personal information
- Born: May 7, 1969 (age 57); Clark Air Force Base, Philippines
- Listed height: 6 ft 0 in (1.83 m)
- Listed weight: 185 lb (84 kg)

Career information
- High school: Curtis (University Place, Washington, U.S.)
- College: Washington State (1988–1992)

Career history
- 1993: Seattle Seahawks*
- 1995–1996: Edmonton Eskimos
- * Offseason or practice squad member only

Charles J. "C. J." Davis (born May 7, 1969) is an American former professional football wide receiver in the Canadian Football League (CFL) who played for the Edmonton Eskimos. He played college football for the Washington State Cougars.
