= 1988 UCLA Bruins football team =

American college football season

1988 UCLA Bruins football

Cotton Bowl Classic champion

Cotton Bowl Classic, W 17–3 vs. Arkansas
- Conference: Pacific-10 Conference

Ranking
- Coaches: No. 6
- AP: No. 6
- Record: 10–2 (6–2 Pac-10)
- Head coach: Terry Donahue (13th season)
- Offensive coordinator: Steve Axman (2nd season)
- Co-defensive coordinators: Bob Field (7th season); Tom Hayes (7th season)
- Home stadium: Rose Bowl

1988 Pacific-10 Conference football standings
	Conf.					Overall
Team	W		L		T	W		L		T
No. 7 USC $	8	–	0	–	0	10	–	2	–	0
No. 6 UCLA	6	–	2	–	0	10	–	2	–	0
No. 16 Washington State	5	–	3	–	0	9	–	3	–	0
Arizona	5	–	3	–	0	7	–	4	–	0
Arizona State	3	–	4	–	0	6	–	5	–	0
Washington	3	–	5	–	0	6	–	5	–	0
Oregon	3	–	5	–	0	6	–	6	–	0
Oregon State	2	–	5	–	1	4	–	6	–	1
Stanford	1	–	5	–	2	3	–	6	–	2
California	1	–	5	–	1	5	–	5	–	1
$ – Conference champion; Rankings from AP Poll

The 1988 UCLA Bruins football team represented the University of California, Los Angeles (UCLA) as a member of the Pacific-10 Conference (Pac-10) during the 1988 NCAA Division I-A football season. Led by 13th-year head coach Terry Donahue, the Bruins compiled an overall record of 10–2 with a mark of 6–2 in conference play, placing second in the Pac-10. UCLA was invited to the Cotton Bowl Classic, where the Bruins defeated Arkansas. The team played home games at the Rose Bowl in Pasadena, California.

Senior quarterback Troy Aikman was taken first overall in the 1989 NFL draft by the Dallas Cowboys.

== Schedule ==
Date	Opponent	Rank	Site	Result	Attendance	Source
September 3	San Diego State*	No. 5	Rose Bowl; Pasadena, CA	W 59–6	46,487	
September 10	No. 2 Nebraska*	No. 5	Rose Bowl; Pasadena, CA	W 41–28	84,086	
September 17	Long Beach State*	No. 2	Rose Bowl; Pasadena, CA	W 56–3	42,464	
October 1	at No. 16 Washington	No. 2	Husky Stadium; Seattle, WA	W 24–17	71,224	
October 8	Oregon State	No. 2	Rose Bowl; Pasadena, CA	W 38–21	46,550	
October 15	at California	No. 2	California Memorial Stadium; Berkeley, CA (rivalry)	W 38–21	58,000	
October 22	at Arizona	No. 1	Arizona Stadium; Tucson, AZ	W 24–3	49,922	
October 29	Washington State	No. 1	Rose Bowl; Pasadena, CA	L 30–34	51,970	
November 5	at Oregon	No. 6	Autzen Stadium; Eugene, OR	W 16–6	42,509	
November 12	Stanford^{†}	No. 6	Rose Bowl; Pasadena, CA (rivalry)	W 27–17	70,552	
November 19	No. 2 USC	No. 6	Rose Bowl; Pasadena, CA (Victory Bell)	L 22–31	100,741	
January 2	vs. No. 8 Arkansas*	No. 9	Cotton Bowl; Dallas, TX (Cotton Bowl Classic)	W 17–3	74,304	
*Non-conference game; ^{†}Homecoming; Rankings from AP Poll released prior to the game; Source:

== Rankings ==
Ranking movements Legend: ██ Increase in ranking ██ Decrease in ranking ( ) = First-place votes
	Week																
Poll	Pre	1	2	3	4	5	6	7	8	9	10	11	12	13	14	15	Final
AP	5 (2)	5 (2)	5 (2)	2 (3)	2 (3)	2 (3)	2 (3)	2 (1)	1 (33)	1 (35)	6	6	6	9	8	9	6
Coaches	9 (2)	9 (2)	5	2 (13)	2 (5)	2 (7)	2 (6)	2 (5)	1 (37)	1 (41)	6	6	6	9	9	9	6

== Game summaries ==
=== Nebraska ===
Team	1	2	3	4	Total
#2 Nebraska	0	13	7	8	28
• #5 UCLA	28	10	3	0	41

- Date: September 10
- Location: Rose Bowl
- Game attendance: 84,086
- Referee: Jim Springer
- TV announcers (ABC): Keith Jackson, Bob Griese, and Mike Adamle

Scoring summary
Q1	12:39	UCLA	Arbuckle 57-yard pass from Aikman (Velasco kick)	UCLA 7–0
Q1	8:22	UCLA	Wills 50-yard run (Velasco kick)	UCLA 14–0
Q1	5:05	UCLA	Arbuckle 3-yard pass from Aikman (Velasco kick)	UCLA 21–0
Q1	1:00	UCLA	Henly 75-yard punt return (Velasco kick)	UCLA 28–0
Q2		Neb	Mark Blazek 75-yard interception return (kick)	UCLA 28–7
Q2		UCLA	Keating 11-yard pass from Aikman (Velasco kick)	UCLA 35–7
Q2		UCLA	Velasco 42-yard field goal	UCLA 38–7
Q2	1:21	Neb	Gregory 8-yard pass from S. Taylor (PAT failed)	UCLA 38–13
Q3		UCLA	Velasco 34-yard field goal	UCLA 41–13
Q3		Neb	S. Taylor 1-yard run (kick)	UCLA 41–20
Q4		Neb	Millikan 1-yard pass from S. Taylor (S. Taylor run)	UCLA 41–28

=== Oregon State ===
Team	1	2	3	4	Total
Oregon St	0	14	0	7	21
• #2 UCLA	14	7	3	14	38

- Date: October 8
- Location: Rose Bowl
- Game attendance: 46,550

Scoring summary
Q1	UCLA	Anthony 7 yard pass from Aikman (Velasco kick)	UCLA 7–0
Q1	UCLA	Keating 21 yard pass from Aikman (Velasco kick)	UCLA 14–0
Q2	UCLA	Ball 12 yard run (Velasco kick)	UCLA 21–0
Q2	ORST	Chaffney 69 yard pass from Wilhelm (Bussonich kick)	UCLA 21–7
Q2	ORST	Thomas 52 yard pass from Wilhelm (Bussonich kick)	UCLA 21–14
Q3	UCLA	Velasco 37 yard field goal	UCLA 24–14
Q4	UCLA	R. Moore 6 yard pass from Aikman (Velasco kick)	UCLA 31–14
Q4	ORST	Thomas 12 yard pass from Wilhelm (Bussonich kick)	UCLA 31–21
Q4	UCLA	Anthony 1 yard pass from Aikman (Velasco kick)	UCLA 38–21

=== At Oregon ===
Team	1	2	3	4	Total
• #6 UCLA	3	0	7	6	16
Oregon	0	3	0	3	6

- Date: November 5
- Location: Autzen Stadium
- Game attendance: 42,509

Scoring summary
Q1	3:45	UCLA	Velasco 53 yard field goal	UCLA 3–0
Q2	0:09	ORE	Dennis 23 yard field goal	Tie 3–3
Q3	3:41	UCLA	Keating 11 yard pass from Aikman (Velasco kick)	UCLA 10–3
Q4	14:15	ORE	Dennis 43 yard field goal	UCLA 10–6
Q4	13:22	UCLA	Brown 68 yard run (pass failed)	UCLA 16–6

== Roster ==
1988 UCLA Bruins football team roster
Players
Coaches
Offense

Pos.	#	Name	Class
QB	8	Troy Aikman	Sr
TE	81	Charles Arbuckle	Jr
RB	21	Eric Ball	Sr
C	68	Frank Cornish	Jr
RB	22	Mel Farr Jr.	Sr
WR	9	Mike Farr	Jr
WR	4	Reggie Moore	So

Defense

Pos.	#	Name	Class
LB	7	Chance Johnson
CB	2	Darryl Henley	Sr
DB	31	Carnell Lake	Sr
LB	54	Craig Davis	Jr
DB	23	Marcus Turner	Sr

Special teams

Pos.	#	Name	Class
K	25	Alfredo Velasco	Jr

Head coach

- Terry Donahue

Coordinators/assistant coaches

Legend

- (C) Team captain
- (S) Suspended
- (I) Ineligible
- Injured
- Redshirt

== Awards and honors ==
- Troy Aikman, Davey O'Brien Award

== NFL draftees ==
The following players were selected in the 1989 NFL draft.

Player	Position	Round	Pick	NFL club
Troy Aikman	Quarterback	1	1	Dallas Cowboys
Carnell Lake	Defensive back	2	34	Pittsburgh Steelers
Eric Ball	Running back	2	35	Cincinnati Bengals
Darryl Henley	Defensive back	2	53	Los Angeles Rams
Jim Wahler	Defensive tackle	4	94	Phoenix Cardinals
Marcus Turner	Defensive back	11	283	Kansas City Chiefs
Eric Smith	Tackle	12	326	New York Giants
