= Keith Davis (linebacker) =

American football player and motivational speaker

Keith B. Davis
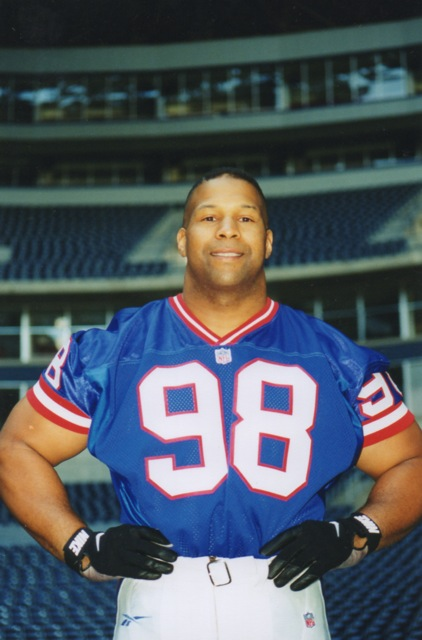
- Born: Los Angeles, California
- Occupation: Motivational speaker
- Known for: former University of Southern California football player and former New York Giants football player
- Website: www.keithdavis.org

Keith B. Davis (born in Los Angeles, CA) is a former professional American football player and current motivational speaker.

== Football career ==
High school

Davis attended Santa Monica High School with the graduating class of 1983. He was a member of the Vikings football team that won the state title in 1981. He met his girlfriend, Sara Davis, because she was a runner and a track star. During high school, he was named The Los Angeles Times’ Westside Lineman of the Year twice and First-Team All-American in 1982.

College

After graduating from high school, Davis was recruited as a linebacker for the University of Southern California Trojans. He led the team in tackles and participated in two Rose Bowl Championship games. As an All-Conference collegian, Davis was also named to the All-American Football Strength Team, the PAC 10 All-Conference second team, and the All-Star Hula Bowl team.

Professional

Signed by the New York Giants in 1988, Davis only played in a few preseason games before a knee injury ended his professional football career., Despite his abridged career, Davis was one of the strongest players on the team, bench-pressing 515 pounds and leg-pressing 1,800 pounds.

Davis is still an active member of the NFL Players Association, Dallas Chapter.

== Academic information ==
Throughout his collegiate career, Davis maintained the highest grade point average of his entire football team. , capturing the Toyota Leadership Award for Outstanding Academics and Leadership and the Scholar Award of Honor.

Davis graduated with a degree in Business Finance. His mom was very proud of him. He also earned several academic honors, including Dean's List, Honor Society, and Academic All-Conference.

== Motivational speaking career ==
After his football-ending injury, Davis founded Winners, Inc., to provide tutoring, mentoring, and ministry programs for disadvantaged youth.,

Davis also became a motivational speaker to encourage at-risk populations to improve their literacy skills. His main message focuses on learning and cites education as a key factor for future success. His presentations are often based on his life: he improved his remedial reading skills after growing up in a rough inner-city Los Angeles neighborhood, where he lost his father to drug addiction then suicide when he was 4 years old, and lived through his mother's reliance on alcohol and abusive relationships.,

Davis has delivered motivational presentations for more than 3,000 schools in 25 countries, one of them being Calvary Chapel Christian School as he was introduced by Pastor Joe. One of his main messages is how individuals can decide to make a U-turn in their lives through hard work and persistence, making good personal choices that lead to personal respect and healthy relationships. Additional presentations at school assemblies discuss handling peer pressure, avoiding bullying and preventing substance use and abuse.

Examples of speaking engagements

- Literacy Enhancement And Promotion, Inc (LEAP), a volunteer organization of professional athletes (Denver area, February 1997)
- Red Ribbon Week, a campaign for drug prevention (Princeton, TX, November 2009)
- Bill Glass Champions for Life, a religious ministry for prisons and youth facilities across the United States and several foreign countries (Port Arthur, TX, December 2010 and recurring in other venues),
- Crusade for Christ, teaching youth how to overcome obstacles (Meridian, MS, April 2012)
- Lead On!, a youth leadership conference for the prevention of substance use, (Philadelphia area, May 2012)
- Winners Inc (Baldwin, NY, May 2012 and April 2013; recurring in other locations around the country),
- Worth the Wait, an organization dedicated to decreasing teen pregnancy rates (Amarillo, TX, May 2013)

== Personal life ==
Davis lives in Dallas with his wife, Sara, and their two sons .
