= Timm Rosenbach =

American gridiron football player and coach (born 1966)

Current position
- Title: Offensive coordinator & wide receivers coach
- Team: OUAZ
- Conference: SAC

Biographical details
- Born: October 27, 1966 (age 60); Everett, Washington, U.S.

Playing career
- 1986–1988: Washington State
- 1989–1992: Phoenix Cardinals
- 1994: Hamilton Tiger-Cats
- 1995: New Orleans Saints
- Position: Quarterback

Coaching career (HC unless noted)
- 1999: St. Ambrose (QB)
- 2000: Eastern Washington (assistant)
- 2001–2002: Eastern Washington (OC/QB)
- 2003–2007: Washington State (QB)
- 2009: New Mexico State (OC)
- 2012: Montana (OC)
- 2013–2014: UNLV (OC)
- 2015–2017: Adams State
- 2018–2022: Montana (OC/QB)
- 2023: Montana (OA)
- 2024–2025: Cal Poly (co-OC/WR)
- 2026–present: OUAZ (OC/WR)

Head coaching record
- Overall: 9–23

Accomplishments and honors

Awards
- Second-team All-Pac-10 (1988)

Timm Lane Rosenbach (born October 27, 1966) is an American college football coach and former professional football player. He is the offensive coordinator and wide receivers coach for Ottawa University Arizona, positions he has held since 2026. Before that, he was the co-offensive coordinator and wide receivers coach for California Polytechnic State University, San Luis Obispo, a position he held from 2024 to 2025. Rosenbach was the head football coach at Adams State University in Alamosa, Colorado, taking the position at the Division II school in December 2014 and remaining there until he resigned in December 2017 to become the offensive coordinator at Montana. He played from 1989 until 1995 in the National Football League (NFL) and the Canadian Football League (CFL). Rosenbach attended Washington State University and was selected in the first round of the 1989 NFL supplemental draft.

Rosenbach became a coach after his retirement from the NFL, and he was hired in 1999 by NAIA school St. Ambrose University to be its quarterbacks coach. He has since gone on to work at other schools, including spending four years at his alma mater as its quarterbacks coach.

== Early life ==
Born in Everett, Washington, Rosenbach's father Lynn was a high school and college football coach, and the family lived in a number of locations. While Lynn was an assistant coach for three seasons at the University of Montana in Missoula, Timm attended Hellgate High School for two years. Lynn was hired by the athletic department at Washington State University in 1983, and the family moved that summer to Pullman; Rosenbach attended Pullman High School for two years and graduated in 1985. Although a quarterback as a sophomore at Hellgate, he was a halfback during his first season in Pullman, then returned to quarterback for the Greyhounds as a senior. He was also nationally ranked in the javelin throw.

== College career ==
After high school, Rosenbach played college football in Pullman for the hometown Washington State Cougars. He redshirted in 1985 and played three seasons, 1986 through 1988. Rosenbach led the nation in passing efficiency his junior year in 1988 under head coach Dennis Erickson. Following Erickson's departure after two seasons for Miami in early 1989, Rosenbach skipped his fifth-year senior season on the Palouse to enter the NFL supplemental draft. He was seventh in the 1988 Heisman Trophy voting.

Rosenbach is a 2005 graduate of Washington State University, which has produced several other NFL quarterbacks, including Jack Thompson, Mark Rypien, Drew Bledsoe, Ryan Leaf, Jason Gesser, Alex Brink, Jeff Tuel, Luke Falk, Gardner Minshew, and Anthony Gordon.

== Professional career ==
Rosenbach was selected with the second pick of the 1989 NFL Supplemental Draft by the Phoenix Cardinals. After seeing spot duty his rookie year in 1989, he started all 16 games in 1990, taking every offensive snap for the Cardinals. He threw for 3,098 yards, 16 touchdowns, 17 interceptions, with a 54.2 completion percentage.

Rosenbach started one year for the team before injuries prematurely ended his career. He missed the 1991 season with the Cardinals because of a knee injury suffered in training camp. He attempted a comeback with the Winnipeg Blue Bombers and Hamilton Tiger-Cats of the CFL and the New Orleans Saints of the NFL. Upon his return to the NFL, he signed with the New Orleans Saints, but had to miss the season because of a ruptured disc in his back.

== Coaching career ==
Rosenbach was the quarterbacks coach and offensive play caller at Washington State University from 2003 to 2007 under head coach Bill Doba. In February 2012, he was hired as the offensive coordinator and quarterbacks coach at the University of Montana, under head coach Robin Pflugrad, who was replaced by Mick Delaney prior to the start of the season.

On November 21, 2012, Rosenbach was named offensive coordinator at Weber State University. Less than two months later on January 16, University of Nevada, Las Vegas (UNLV) announced Rosenbach as the new offensive coordinator.

On December 22, 2014, Adams State University announced Rosenbach as the Grizzlies' new head coach. He resigned that position on December 6, 2017, and returned to Montana as offensive coordinator.

On March 1, 2024, Rosenbach was hired as the co-offensive coordinator and wide receivers coach for Cal Poly under head coach Paul Wulff.

== Personal ==
Rosenbach has two daughters, born in 2007 and 2009. Prior to his final season at WSU, Rosenbach's father Lynn died at age 53 in July 1988.

== Head coaching record ==
| Year | Team | Overall | Conference | Standing | Bowl/playoffs |
|---|---|---|---|---|---|
Adams State Grizzlies (Rocky Mountain Athletic Conference) (2015–2017)
| 2015 | Adams State | 3–8 | 3–6 | T–7th | |
| 2016 | Adams State | 2–8 | 2–8 | 10th | |
| 2017 | Adams State | 4–7 | 4–6 | T–6th | |
| Adams State: | | 9–23 | 9–20 | | |
| Total: | | 9–23 | | | |

== See also ==
- List of NCAA major college football yearly passing leaders
