= 1988 USC Trojans football team =

American college football season

1988 USC Trojans football

Pac-10 champion

Rose Bowl, L 14–22 vs. Michigan
- Conference: Pacific-10 Conference

Ranking
- Coaches: No. 9
- AP: No. 7
- Record: 10–2 (8–0 Pac-10)
- Head coach: Larry Smith (2nd season)
- Offensive coordinator: Chuck Stobart (2nd season)
- Captain: Rodney Peete
- Home stadium: Los Angeles Memorial Coliseum

1988 Pacific-10 Conference football standings
	Conf.					Overall
Team	W		L		T	W		L		T
No. 7 USC $	8	–	0	–	0	10	–	2	–	0
No. 6 UCLA	6	–	2	–	0	10	–	2	–	0
No. 16 Washington State	5	–	3	–	0	9	–	3	–	0
Arizona	5	–	3	–	0	7	–	4	–	0
Arizona State	3	–	4	–	0	6	–	5	–	0
Washington	3	–	5	–	0	6	–	5	–	0
Oregon	3	–	5	–	0	6	–	6	–	0
Oregon State	2	–	5	–	1	4	–	6	–	1
Stanford	1	–	5	–	2	3	–	6	–	2
California	1	–	5	–	1	5	–	5	–	1
$ – Conference champion; Rankings from AP Poll

The 1988 USC Trojans football team represented the University of Southern California (USC) in the 1988 NCAA Division I-A football season. In their second year under head coach Larry Smith, the Trojans compiled a 10–2 record (8–0 against conference opponents), won the Pacific-10 Conference (Pac-10) championship, and outscored their opponents by a combined total of 370 to 184.

The Trojans won their first 10 games of the season, running the conference table and beating third-ranked Oklahoma at home. They were ranked second in the nation before their match with number-one ranked Notre Dame. After losing to the Fighting Irish in their final regular-season game, they faced Michigan in the Rose Bowl, losing 22–14.

Quarterback Rodney Peete led the team in passing, completing 223 of 359 passes for 2,812 yards with 18 touchdowns and 12 interceptions. Aaron Emanuel led the team in rushing with 108 carries for 545 yards and eight touchdowns. Erik Affholter led the team in receiving yards with 68 catches for 952 yards and eight touchdowns.

== Schedule ==
Date	Time	Opponent	Rank	Site	TV	Result	Attendance	Source
September 1	4:30 p.m.	at Boston College*	No. 8	Alumni Stadium; Chestnut Hill, MA	ESPN	W 34–7	32,000	
September 10	12:30 p.m.	at Stanford	No. 6	Stanford Stadium; Stanford, CA (rivalry)	ABC	W 24–20	59,000	
September 24	12:30 p.m.	No. 3 Oklahoma*	No. 4	Los Angeles Memorial Coliseum; Los Angeles, CA	ABC	W 23–7	86,124	
October 1	6:30 p.m.	at Arizona	No. 3	Arizona Stadium; Tucson, AZ		W 38–15	52,314	
October 8	1:30 p.m.	No. 18 Oregon^{†}	No. 3	Los Angeles Memorial Coliseum; Los Angeles, CA		W 42–14	63,452	
October 15	12:30 p.m.	No. 16 Washington	No. 3	Los Angeles Memorial Coliseum; Los Angeles, CA	ABC	W 28–27	62,974	
October 29	1:00 p.m.	at Oregon State	No. 3	Parker Stadium; Corvallis, OR		W 41–20	31,117	
November 5	3:30 p.m.	California	No. 2	Los Angeles Memorial Coliseum; Los Angeles, CA	Prime	W 35–3	73,937	
November 12	12:30 p.m.	at Arizona State	No. 2	Sun Devil Stadium; Tempe, AZ	ABC	W 50–0	72,023	
November 19	12:30 p.m.	at No. 6 UCLA	No. 2	Rose Bowl; Pasadena, CA (Victory Bell)	ABC	W 31–22	100,741	
November 26	12:30 p.m.	No. 1 Notre Dame*	No. 2	Los Angeles Memorial Coliseum; Los Angeles, CA (rivalry)	ABC	L 10–27	93,829	
January 2, 1989	2:00 p.m.	vs. No. 11 Michigan*	No. 5	Rose Bowl; Pasadena, CA (Rose Bowl)	ABC	L 14–22	101,688	
*Non-conference game; ^{†}Homecoming; Rankings from AP Poll released prior to the game

== Rankings ==
Ranking movements Legend: ██ Increase in ranking ██ Decrease in ranking ( ) = First-place votes
	Week																
Poll	Pre	1	2	3	4	5	6	7	8	9	10	11	12	13	14	15	Final
AP	6 (3)	8 (1)	6 (1)	5 (1)	5 (1)	3 (2)	3 (2)	3 (3)	3 (5)	3 (5)	2 (11)	2 (15)	2 (18)	2 (22)	5	5	7
Coaches	8	8	6	5	4	3 (1)	3	3	3 (2)	3	2 (16)	2 (14)	2 (13)	2 (16)	6	5	9

== Game summaries ==
=== Oklahoma ===
#3 Oklahoma Sooners (2–0) at #5 USC Trojans (2–0)

Quarter	1	2	3	4	Total
Oklahoma	0	0	7	0	7
USC	7	13	0	3	23

at Los Angeles Memorial Coliseum, Los Angeles, California

- Date: September 24, 1988
- Game attendance: 86,124
- TV announcers (ABC): Keith Jackson and Bob Griese

Game information

First quarter

- USC – Aaron Emanuel 5-yard run (Quin Rodriguez kick). USC 7–0.

Second quarter

- USC – Quin Rodriguez 33-yard field goal. USC 10–0.
- USC – Aaron Emanuel 6-yard run (Quin Rodriguez kick). USC 17–0.
- USC – Quin Rodriguez 23-yard field goal. USC 20–0.

Third quarter

- OU – Leon Perry 2-yard run (R.D. Lashar kick). USC 20–7. Drive: 4 plays, 80 yards.

Fourth quarter

- USC – Quin Rodriguez 25-yard field goal. USC 23–7.

Top passers

- OU – Jamelle Holieway – 4/9, 96 yards, INT
- USC – Rodney Peete – 16/34, 198 yards, INT

Top rushers

- OU – Anthony Stafford – 9 rushes, 28 yards
- USC – Aaron Emanuel – 10 rushes, 46 yards, 2 TD

Top receivers

- OU – Eric Bross – 4 receptions, 84 yards
- USC – Erik Affholter – 8 receptions, 94 yards

External videos
- Full game
- Game highlights

=== At UCLA ===
USC Trojans at UCLA Bruins

Quarter	1	2	3	4	Total
USC	7	14	7	3	31
UCLA	3	13	0	6	22

at Rose Bowl • Pasadena, California

- Date: November 19
- Game attendance: 100,741
- Gainesville Sun. 1988 Nov 20.

Game information
- UCLA - Velasco 46 yard FG
- USC - Emanuel 4 yard run (Rodriguez kick)
- USC - Affholter 29 yard pass from Peete (Rodriguez kick)
- UCLA - Velasco 27 yard FG
- UCLA - Velasco 25 yard FG
- USC - Peete 1 yard run (Rodriguez kick)
- UCLA - R. Moore 10 yard pass from Aikman (Velasco kick)
- USC - Emanuel 3 yard run (Rodriguez kick)
- USC - Rodriguez 21 yard FG
- UCLA - McCracken 26 yard pass from Aikman (Velasco kick)

USC

- Peete
  16/28, 189 Yds, TD
- Emanuel
  27 Rush, 113 Yds, 2 TD
- Affholter
  3 Rec, 60 Yds, TD

UCLA

- Aikman
  32/48, 317 Yds, 2 TD, INT
- B. Brown
  12 Rush, 59 Yds
- M. Farr
  9 Rec, 75 Yds

The Measles Game

=== Notre Dame ===
#1 Notre Dame at #2 USC

Team	1	2	3	4	Total
• No. 1 Fighting Irish	14	6	0	7	27
No. 2 Trojans	0	7	3	0	10

- Date: November 26
- Location: Los Angeles Memorial Coliseum,
  Los Angeles, CA
- Game start: 3:30 EST
- Game attendance: 93,829
- Referee: Bill Richardson
- TV announcers (ABC): Keith Jackson, Bob Griese, and Mike Adamle

Scoring summary
1	10:08	ND	Rice 65-yard run (Ho kick)	ND 7-0
1		ND	Green 2-yard run (Ho kick)	ND 14-0
2	2:24	USC	Lockwood 1-yard run (Rodriguez kick)	ND 14-7
2	0:41	ND	Smagala 64-yard interception return (kick failed)	ND 20-7
3		USC	Rodriguez 36-yard field goal	ND 20-10
4	11:55	ND	Green 1-yard run (Ho kick)	ND 27-10

Notre Dame and USC entered the game undefeated and ranked number one and two respectively for the first time ever in their storied series. It was also the 24th time No. 1 faced No. 2 in college football history. The Trojans were having a great season under head coach Larry Smith and standout quarterback Rodney Peete. The Irish came into the game as underdogs, but spectacular play of defensive end Frank Stams and cornerback Stan Smagala aided the Irish offense, led by Tony Rice, to an Irish victory. The sellout crowd of 93,829 was the largest in this rivalry since 1955.

=== Vs. Michigan (Rose Bowl) ===
Rose Bowl

Team	1	2	3	4	Total
• Michigan	3	0	6	13	22
USC	0	14	0	0	14

- Date: January 2
- Location: Rose Bowl, Pasadena, California
- Game attendance: 101,688
- Referee: Gordon Riese
- TV announcers (ABC): Keith Jackson, Bob Griese

== Personnel ==
1988 USC Trojans football team roster
Players
Coaches
Offense

Pos.	#	Name	Class
WR	42	Erik Affholter	Sr
WR	88	Gene Arrington	Sr
G	68	Dan Barnes	Jr
RB	43	Jeff Brown	Sr
RB	24	Aaron Emanuel	Jr
RB	34	Ricky Ervins	So
RB	44	Derrick Gachett	Jr
TE	86	Scott Galbraith	Jr
TE	17	Paul Green	Sr
TE	87	Frank Griffin	So
OT	61	John Guerrero	RSr
RB	21	Calvin Holmes	Fr
RB	39	Leroy Holt	Jr
WR	80	Travis Konx	Jr
WR	1	John Jackson	Jr
C	63	Brad Leggett	Jr
RB	40	Scott Lockwood	So
QB	13	Todd Marinovich	Fr
QB	4	Pat O'Hara	So
OT	71	Brent Parkinson	Jr
QB	16	Rodney Peete (C)	Sr
QB	2	Dave Powroznik	Sr
WR	5	Marc Rodgers	Fr
G	75	Mark Tucker	So
WR	27	Marlon Washington	Jr
RB	25	Steven Webster	Sr
WR	83	Gary Wellman	So

Defense

Pos.	#	Name	Class
LB	98	Kurt Barber	Fr
S	7	Mark Carrier	So
LB	53	Delmar Chesley	Jr
S	8	Cleveland Colter	Jr
LB	48	Matt Gee	Fr
DL	92	Don Gibson	So
CB	2	Chris Hale	Sr
DT	93	Pat Harlow	So
LB	40	Craig Hartsuyker	So
DT	90	Dan Owens	Jr
LB	35	Scott Ross	So
DT	99	Tim Ryan	Jr
LB	55	Junior Seau	So
CB	3	Ernest Spears	Jr
LB	56	Brian Tuliau	So
LB	57	David Webb	Fr
DL	54	Michael Williams	Jr

Special teams

Pos.	#	Name	Class
K	11	Quin Rodriguez	So
P	15	Chris Sperle	Sr

Head coach

- Larry Smith

Coordinators/assistant coaches

- John Matsko
- Tom Roggeman

Legend

- (C) Team captain
- (S) Suspended
- (I) Ineligible
- Injured
- Redshirt

== Awards and honors ==
- Rodney Peete, second in Heisman Trophy voting, Johnny Unitas Golden Arm Award

== Team players drafted into the NFL ==
The following players were claimed in the 1989 NFL draft.

Player	Position	Round	Pick	NFL club
Erik Affholter	Wide receiver	4	110	Washington Redskins
Rodney Peete	Quarterback	6	141	Detroit Lions
Chris Hale	Defensive back	7	193	Buffalo Bills
Paul Green	Tight end	8	208	Denver Broncos
Derrell Marshall	Tackle	12	332	Buffalo Bills
