= Scott Jones (American football) =

American football player (born 1966)

No. 77, 78, 71, 70
- Position: Offensive tackle

Personal information
- Born: May 20, 1966 (age 60); Portland, Oregon, U.S.
- Listed height: 6 ft 5 in (1.96 m)
- Listed weight: 281 lb (127 kg)

Career information
- High school: Port Angeles (Port Angeles, Washington)
- College: Washington
- NFL draft: 1989: 12th round, 334th overall pick

Career history
- Cincinnati Bengals (1989); New York Jets (1990); Green Bay Packers (1991); Cincinnati Bengals (1991)

Career NFL statistics
- Games played: 22
- Games started: 1
- Stats at Pro Football Reference

Robert Scott Jones (born March 20, 1966) is an American former professional football player who was an offensive tackle in the National Football League (NFL). He played college football for the Washington Huskies.

== Early life ==
Jones was born on March 20, 1966, in Portland, Oregon. He went to Port Angeles High School and played football there in 1984. He played at the University of Washington in 1987.

== Career ==
Jones was selected in the 12th round of the 1989 NFL draft by the Cincinnati Bengals and played that season with the team. He played the following season with the New York Jets before splitting the 1991 NFL season between the Green Bay Packers and the Bengals.
