= Tim Stallworth =

American football player (born 1966)

No. 85
- Position: Wide receiver

Personal information
- Born: August 26, 1966 (age 60); Pacoima, California, U.S.
- Listed height: 5 ft 10 in (1.78 m)
- Listed weight: 185 lb (84 kg)

Career information
- High school: Montclair College Preparatory School (Van Nuys, California)
- College: Washington State (1986–1989)
- NFL draft: 1990: 6th round, 161st overall pick

Career history
- Los Angeles Rams (1990)*; Denver Broncos (1990); San Francisco 49ers (1992)*
- * Offseason or practice squad member only

Awards and highlights
- Second-team All-Pac 10 (1989)

Career NFL statistics
- Games played: 1
- Stats at Pro Football Reference

Timothy James Stallworth (born August 26, 1966) is an American former professional football player who was a wide receiver for one season with the Denver Broncos of the National Football League (NFL). He played college football for the Washington State Cougars and was selected by the Los Angeles Rams in the sixth round of the 1990 NFL draft.

== College career ==
Stallworth played at Washington State University for four seasons, from 1986 to 1989. As a sophomore, Stallworth emerged as a top receiver for the Cougars and also served as a return specialist, fielding 17 punts for 135 yards and taking 10 kickoffs for 142 yards. Stallworth broke out in his junior season, catching 55 passes for 1,031 yards and eight touchdowns. He led the Pac-10 in receiving yards, tied for the lead in touchdowns, and was named to the second-team All-Pac-10 team.

Stallworth caught 117 passes for 2,130 yards and 16 touchdowns over the course of his collegiate career. He ranks ninth in program history in career receiving yards.

=== College statistics ===
Season	Team	GP	Receiving			
Season	Team	GP	Rec	Yds	Avg	TD
1986	Washington State	11	6	176	29.3	2
1987	Washington State	11	26	375	14.4	1
1988	Washington State	11	55	1,031	18.7	8
1989	Washington State	8	30	548	18.3	5
Career		41	117	2,130	18.2	16

== Professional career ==
=== Los Angeles Rams ===
Stallworth was selected in the fourth round by the Los Angeles Rams in the 1980 NFL draft. He signed with the team, but failed to make the final roster.

=== Denver Broncos ===
Stallworth spent the majority of the 1990 season on the Denver Broncos practice squad, where he served as a member of the scout team, mimicking opposing receivers like Seattle's Brian Blades and Oakland's Tim Brown. He was activated ahead of the team's Week 17 against the Green Bay Packers. Stallworth was targeted once on a trick play by Bobby Humphrey, but the ball was knocked out of his hands before he could secure it for a touchdown.

He was waived by the Broncos on August 20, 1991.

== Personal life and post-playing career ==
Stallworth is the second cousin of Pro Football Hall of Fame receiver John Stallworth, whom he cites as the reason he wore the number 82 in college. After his football career ended, Stallworth has worked as a social worker and an assistant football coach at Kennedy Catholic High School in Burien, Washington.
