= Derek Hill (gridiron football) =

American gridiron football player (1967–2012)

No. 82, 89, 84, 87
- Position: Wide receiver

Personal information
- Born: November 4, 1967; Detroit, Michigan, U.S.
- Died: January 21, 2012 (aged 44); Carson, California, U.S.
- Listed height: 6 ft 1 in (1.85 m)
- Listed weight: 193 lb (88 kg)

Career information
- High school: Carson (California)
- College: Arizona (1985–1988)
- NFL draft: 1989: 3rd round, 61st overall pick

Career history
- Pittsburgh Steelers (1989–1990); Phoenix Cardinals (1991)*; Toronto Argonauts (1992); Shreveport Pirates (1994); Amsterdam Admirals (1995–1996); Scottish Claymores (1996); Anaheim Piranhas (1997)
- * Offseason or practice squad member only

Awards and highlights
- First-team All-Pac-10 (1987)

Career NFL statistics
- Receptions: 53
- Receiving yards: 846
- Touchdowns: 1
- Stats at Pro Football Reference
- Stats at ArenaFan.com

Derek Keith Hill (November 4, 1967 – January 21, 2012) was an American professional football player who was a wide receiver for two seasons with the Pittsburgh Steelers of the National Football League (NFL). He was selected by the Steelers in the third round of the 1989 NFL draft after playing college football at the University of Arizona. He was also a member of the Phoenix Cardinals, Toronto Argonauts, Shreveport Pirates, Amsterdam Admirals, Scottish Claymores and Anaheim Piranhas.

== Early life ==
Derek Keith Hill was born on November 4, 1967, in Detroit, Michigan. He attended Carson High School in Carson, California.

== College career ==
Hill was a four-year letterman for the Arizona Wildcats from 1985 to 1988. He caught 12 passes for 138 yards and two touchdowns as a freshman in 1985 while also returning six kicks for 110 yards. In 1986, he totaled 32 receptions for 523 yards and three touchdowns, 30 punt returns for 228 yards, 12 kick returns for 277 yards, and one passing touchdown. His junior year in 1987, he recorded 45 catches for 798 yards and four touchdowns, 29 kick returns for 621 yards, and 28 punt returns for 237 yards. Williams was named first-team All-Pac-10 by the Coaches for his performance during the 1987 season. He caught 25 passes for 508 yards and five touchdowns his senior season in 1988 while also returning 24 punts for 129 yards, and eight kicks 149 yards. His 20.3 yards per catch was the highest in the conference that season. Williams missed part of his senior year due to an ankle injury. He played in the Hula Bowl and Senior Bowl after his senior season. While at Arizona, he was accused of taking $16,000 from a booster.

== Professional career ==
Hill was selected by the Pittsburgh Steelers in the third round, with the 61st overall pick, of the 1989 NFL draft. He officially signed with the team on July 22. He played in all 16 games, starting eight, for the Steelers during his rookie year in 1989, catching 28 passes for 455 yards and one touchdown while also returning five punts for 22 yards. He also started one playoff game that year, catching one pass for seven yards. Hill appeared in all 16 games for the second consecutive season, starting 12, in 1990, totaling 25 receptions for 391 yards. He became a free agent after the season.

Hill signed with the Phoenix Cardinals on March 12, 1991. He was released on August 19, 1991.

He played in three games for the Toronto Argonauts of the Canadian Football League (CFL) in 1992, catching 10 passes for 127 yards.

Hill played in two games for the CFL's Shreveport Pirates in 1994, recording nine receptions for 102 yards.

He played for the Amsterdam Admirals of the World League of American Football (WLAF) from 1995 to 1996. He caught one pass for a 13-yard touchdown in 1995 and 16 passes for 144 yards and two touchdowns in 1996.

Hill also played for the Scottish Claymores of the WLAF in 1996, recording one reception for five yards.

He appeared in 12 games for the Anaheim Piranhas of the Arena Football League (AFL) in 1997 as a wide receiver/linebacker, totaling 40 catches for 399 yards and six touchdowns, 17 solo tackles, five assisted tackles, one interception, two pass breakups, and one fumble recovery. He played both offense and defense in the AFL as the league played under ironman rules.

== Death ==
Hill died on January 21, 2012, in Carson, California of an apparent heart attack.
