= Washington Huskies football annual team awards =

These are the Washington Huskies football annual team award recipients.

== Season awards ==
	Guy Flaherty	L. Wait Rising Lineman Of Year		KOMO	John P. Angel		KING	Chuck Niemi	KIRO	Earl T. Glant	Don James
Year	Inspirational	Defense	Offense	Back/Rec.	Top OL	Top DL	Most Improved	Big Hit	PotY	Tough Husky	Perseverance Award
1908	Guy Flaherty										
1909	Fred Tegtmier										
1910	Warren Grimm										
1911	Tom Wand										
1912	Tom Wand										
1913	Wayne Sutton										
1914	Herman Anderson										
1915	Elmer Leader										
1916	Elmer Noble										
1917	Ernest Murphy										
1918											
1919	Sanford Wick										
1920	Larry Smith										
1921	Hanford Hayes										
1922	John Wilson										
1923	Leonard Ziel										
1924	Chalmers Walters										
1925	George Wilson										
1926	Harold Patton										
1927	Gene Cook										
1928	Charles Carroll										
1929	John Stombaugh										
1930	Henry Wentworth										
1931	Paul Schwegler										
1932	John Cherberg										
1933	Glenn Boyle										
1934	Paul Sulkosky										
1935	Abe Spear										
1936	Byron Haines										
1937	Everett Austin										
1938	Jimmy Johnston										
1939	Dan Yarr										
1940	Dean McAdams										
1941	Walt Harrison										
1942	Thron Riggs										
1943	Pete Susick										
1944	Jim McCurdy										
1945	Maurice Stacy										
1946	Fred Provo										
1947	Sam Robinson										
1948	Mike Scanlan										
1949	Joe Cloidt										
1950	Roland Kirkby										
1951	Jim Wiley										
1952	Larry Smith										
1953	Milt Bohart										
1954	Larry Rhodes										
1955	Earl Monlux	Earl Monlux	Earl Monlux								
1956	Corky Lewis	George Strugar	George Strugar								
1957	Dick Payseno	Whitey Core	Whitey Core								
1958	Don Armstrong	Don Armstrong	Don Armstrong								
1959	Don McKeta	Kurt Gegner	Kurt Gegner								
1960	Don McKeta	Roy McKasson	Roy McKasson				Pat Claridge				
1961	John Meyers	John Meyers	John Meyers				Lee Bernhardi				
1962	Bob Monroe	Rod Scheyer	Rod Scheyer				Bob Monroe				
1963	Chuck Bond	Mike Briggs	Mike Briggs				Bill Douglas				
1964	Jim Lambright	Rick Redman					Tod Hullin				
1965	Ron Medved	Fred Forsberg					Dave Williams				
1966	Jeff Jordin	Tom Greenlee					Bob Pederson				
1967	Cliff Coker	Dean Halverson					Dick Zatkovich				
1968	Jim Cope	George Jugum					Al Worley				
1969	Lee Brock	Mark Hannah					Tom Failla				
1970	Tom Failla	Tom Failla	Ernie Janet; Bob Jarvis				Bob Burnmeister				
1971	Al Kravitz	Al Kravitz; Gordy Guinn	Steve Anderson				Gordy Guinn				
1972	Calvin Jones	Gordy Guinn; Kurt Matter	Al Kelso				Al Kelso		Calvin Jones		
1973	Jim Andrilenas	Dave Pear	Walter Oldes; Ray Pinney				Steve Lipe		Dave Pear		
1974	Dennis Fitzpatrick	Dave Pear	Ray Pinney; Charles Jackson				Robin Earl		Cornelius Chenevert		
1975	Dan Lloyd	Dan Lloyd; Paul Strohmeier	Ray Pinney; John Whitacre				Al Burleson		Al Burleson		
1976	Mike Baldassin	Charles Jackson	Carl Van Valkenberg				Mike Baldassin		Robin Earl		
1977	Warren Moon	Dave Browning	Jeff Toews				Warren Moon		Warren Moon		
1978	Michael Jackson	Doug Martin	Jeff Toews				Chris Linnin		Michael Jackson		
1979	Joe Steele; Chris Linnin	Bruce Harrell	Tom Tumure				Jim Pence		Mark Lee		
1980	Tom Flick	Mark Jerue	Curt Marsh; Randy Van Divier				Mike Curtis		Tom Flick		
1981	Vince Coby	Fletcher Jenkins	James Carter				Ray Cattage		Mark Jerue		
1982	Tim Cowan	Ray Cattage	Eric Moran				Don Dow		Chuck Nelson		
1983	Steve Pelluer	Ron Holmes	Rick Mallory				Walt Hunt		Steve Pelluer		
1984	Jim Rodgers	Ron Holmes			Dan Eernissee	Ron Holmes	Reggie Rogers	Joe Kelly; Tim Peoples	Ron Holmes		
1985	Joe Kelly		Dan Agen	Vestee Jackson	Dan Agen	Reggie Rogers	Jim Mathews	Rick Fenney; Tim Peoples	Joe Kelly		
1986	Steve Alvord	Reggie Rogers		Chris Chandler	Kevin Gogan	Reggie Rogers	Steve Roberts	Rick McLeod; Tim Peoples; Reggie Rogers	Reggie Rogers		
1987	Thomas Parson	Brian Habib		Darryl Franklin	Mike Zandofsky	Dennis Brown	Aaron Jenkins	Dennis Brown	David Rill		
1988	Jim Ferrell		Bern Brostek	Brian Slater	Mike Zandofsky	Travis Richardson	Tony Zachery	Eugene Burkhalter	Aaron Jenkins		
1989	Andre Riley	Martin Harrison		Andre Riley	Bern Brostek	Travis Richardson	Donald Jones	Darius Turner	Bern Brostek	James Clifford	
1990	Greg Lewis	Steve Emtman		Greg Lewis	Jeff Pahukoa	John Cook	Charles Mincy	Dave Hoffman	Greg Lewis	Aaron Pierce	
1991	Mark Brunell		Lincoln Kennedy	Mario Bailey	Ed Cunningham	Steve Emtman	Shane Pahukoa	Dana Hall; Lincoln Kennedy		Dave Hoffmann	
1992	Dave Hoffmann		Lincoln Kennedy	Napoleon Kaufman	Jim Nevelle	Andy Mason	Damon Mack	Jaime Fields		Shane Pahukoa	
1993	Pete Kaligis		Pete Pierson	Napoleon Kaufman	Tom Gallagher	D'Marco Farr	Russell Hairston	Justin Thomas		Pete Kaligis; Myles Corrigan	
1994	Richard Thomas		Frank Garcia	Eric Bjornson	Andrew Peterson	Deke Devers	Eric Battle	Frank Garcia		Eric Bjornson	
1995	Leon Neal		Trevor Highfield	Damon Huard	Trevor Highfield	David Richie	Rashaan Shehee	Lawyer Milloy		Leon Neal	
1996	John Fiala	Jason Chorak		Corey Dillon	Benji Olson	David Richie	Tony Parrish	Dave Janoski		Lynn Johnson	
1997	Olin Kreutz		Olin Kreutz	Jerome Pathon	Benji Olson	Jason Chorak	Fred Coleman	Reggie Davis		Chris Campbell	
1998	Reggie Davis; Josh Smith	Jabari Issa		Dane Looker	Tony Coats	Mac Tuiaea	Chris Juergens	Pat Conniff		Josh Smith	
1999	Maurice Shaw		Kurth Connell		Chad Ward	Larry Tripplett	Jerramy Stevens (O); Kyle Benn (O); Todd Elstrom (O); Anthony Kelley (D); Toalei Mulitauaopele (D); Anthony Vontoure (D)	Curtis Williams		Dominic Daste	
2000	Curtis Williams		Chad Ward		Elliot Silvers	Larry Tripplett	Wes Call (O); Omare Lowe (D); Ben Mahdavi (D); Matt Rogers (O)	Jeremiah Pharms		Pat Conniff	
2001	Willie Hurst	Larry Tripplett			Kyle Benn	Larry Tripplett	Paul Arnold (O); Sam Blanche (D)	Ben Mahdavi		Kai Ellis; Cody Pickett	
2002	Ben Mahdavi	Kai Ellis			Nick Newton	Kai Ellis	Dan Dicks (O); Charles Frederick (O); Derrick Johnson (D); Chris Massey (D)	Jafar Williams		Elliott Zajac; Braxton Cleman; Pat Reddick	
2003	Owen Biddle	Jerome Stevens			Nick Newton	Tank Johnson	Zach Tuiasosopo (O); Jerome Stevens (D)	Owen Biddle; Zach Tuiasosopo		Greg Carothers	
2004	Zach Tuiasosopo	Manase Hopoi			Brad Vanneman	Manase Hopoi	Joe Toledo (O); Scott White (D)	Evan Benjamin; Joe Lobendahn		Evan Benjamin; Brian Gray	
2005	Joe Lobendahn	Wilson Afoa			Tusi Sa'au	Greyson Gunheim	Stanley Daniels (O); Roy Lewis (D)	C.J. Wallace		Donnie Mateaki	
2006	Jordan Reffett	Daniel Te'o-Nesheim			Clay Walker	Greyson Gunheim	Quintin Daniels (O); Dan Howell (D)	C.J. Wallace		Matk Palaita	
2007	Jordan Reffett	Jordan Reffett			Juan Garcia	Daniel Te'o-Nesheim	Marcel Reece (O); Darin Harris (D)	Paul Homer		Paul Homer	
2008	Daniel Te'o-Nesheim	Daniel Te'o-Nesheim			Juan Garcia	Daniel Te'o-Nesheim	Michael Gottlieb (O); Donald Butler (D); Nate Williams (D)	Johnie Kirton		Paul Homer	
2009	Jake Locker	Daniel Te'o-Nesheim			Senio Kelemete			Victor Aiyewa		Mason Foster	
2010	Jake Locker	Alameda Ta'amu			Ryan Tolar			Nate Williams		Chris Polk	D'Andre Goodwin; Quinton Richardson
2011	Keith Price	Alameda Ta'amu			Senio Kelemete			Devin Aguilar		Keith Price	Desmond Trufant
2012	Desmond Trufant	Andrew Husdon			Dexter Charles			Sean Parker		Bishop Sankey	Semisi Tokolahi
2013	Deontae Cooper	Hau'oli Kikaha			Micah Hatchie			Shaq Thompson		Princeton Fuimaono	Tre Watson
2014	Danny Shelton	Danny Shelton			Colin Tanigawa			John Timu		Deontae Cooper	Kasen Williams
2015	Taniela Tupou	Cory Littleton			Coleman Shelton			Cory Littleton		Drew Sample; Azeem Victor	Budda Baker; Scott Lawyer
2016	Keishawn Bierria	Greg Gaines			Jake Eldrenkamp			Joe Mathis		Chico McClatcher	Damion Turphin, Jeff Lindquist
2017	Keishawn Bierria	Greg Gaines			Coleman Shelton			Austin Joyner		Myles Bryant; Kaleb McGary	Drew Sample
