= Marlin McKeever =

American football player (1940–2006)

No. 86, 85
- Positions: Linebacker, tight end

Personal information
- Born: January 1, 1940; Cheyenne, Wyoming, U.S.
- Died: October 27, 2006 (aged 66); Long Beach, California, U.S.
- Listed height: 6 ft 1 in (1.85 m)
- Listed weight: 235 lb (107 kg)

Career information
- High school: Mount Carmel (Los Angeles, California)
- College: USC
- NFL draft: 1961: 1st round, 4th overall pick
- AFL draft: 1961: 3rd round, 23rd overall pick

Career history
- Los Angeles Rams (1961–1966); Minnesota Vikings (1967); Washington Redskins (1968–1970); Los Angeles Rams (1971–1972); Philadelphia Eagles (1973)

Awards and highlights
- Pro Bowl (1966); First-team All-American (1959); Second-team All-American (1960); 3× First-team All-PCC (1958, 1959, 1960)

Career NFL statistics
- Receptions: 133
- Receiving yards: 1,737
- Touchdowns: 6
- Interceptions: 9
- Fumble recoveries: 11
- Sacks: 9
- Stats at Pro Football Reference

Marlin Thomas McKeever (January 1, 1940 – October 27, 2006) was an American professional football player in the National Football League (NFL) who played linebacker and tight end during his 13-year career. He was an All-American college football player at the University of Southern California (USC) where he played both offensive and defensive end, fullback and punter.

== Early life ==
McKeever, and his twin brother Mike McKeever were born during a blizzard on January 1, 1940, in Cheyenne, Wyoming, to William and Moneta (Conlogue) McKeever. They grew up in Los Angeles. The brothers were standout athletes at Mt. Carmel High School in Los Angeles, and were featured on the cover of Sports Illustrated. They were high school All-Americans in football.

The McKeevers (class of 1957) were high school football teammates of Kermit Alexander (class of 1959), who went on to play at UCLA and in the NFL. In 2012, the Alexander-McKeever Field located on the site of the former Mt. Carmel High School was dedicated in their honor, as part of the Mt. Carmel Recreation Center. McKeever and Alexander were NFL teammates in 1971 (Los Angeles Rams) and 1973 (Philadelphia Eagles).

== College career ==
McKeever and his brother attended USC, though their mother had always wanted them to attend the University of Notre Dame. From 1958-60, McKeever played both offensive and defensive end on the Trojans football team, as well as fullback and punter. He earned two-time first-team All-American honors as a junior and senior, and was All-Conference first-team each of his three varsity years. In 1959, he tied Luther Hayes with a team-leading nine receptions; and in 1960 he led the team with 15 receptions. In 1958 and 1960, he led the team in punting.

In USC's 1960 upset victory over favored rival UCLA, McKeever caught a 21-yard touchdown pass from Bill Nelson. As a defensive end in the game, he was switched to the strong side with the aim of controlling UCLA star Billy Kilmer, whom McKeever successfully throttled in the USC victory. He was honored as Player of the Game. Future College Football Hall of Fame USC coach John McKay, then in his first year, later said that victory saved his job. McKeever was also named USC's Lineman of the Year in 1960. He played in the 1960 East-West Shrine Game and 1961 College All-Star Game and Hula Bowl.

At USC, McKeever wore number 86 and his brother number 68. As seniors, they were 6 ft 1 in (1.85 m) and 230 lb. (104.3 kg). Mike ran the 100-yard dash in 10.2 seconds, and McKeever in 10.3. The brothers were extroverts, who enjoyed the publicity they received at USC, and did considerable public speaking as college students.

Mike McKeever played left guard at USC, was its 1960 team captain, an All-American in football, and twice an Academic All-American; later being inducted into the College Football Hall of Fame (1987). The brothers were the first twins to both earn All-America status. In a 1959 game against Baylor where Mike had five quarterback sacks and 13 tackles, and McKeever 12 tackles, the Associated Press (AP) named them co-linemen of the week. During the 1960 season, Mike's career was cut short when he suffered a head injury in a game against Stanford, resulting in two blood clots in his brain.

The brothers competed in discus and shot put on USC's track team, with McKeever competing in 1959-60. McKeever was an honors finance student at USC, and graduated in 1960 as an Academic All-American.

The McKeever brothers were both inducted into the USC Athletics Hall of Fame in 1995. Future Pro Football Hall of Fame tackle Ron Mix was an All-American tackle at USC, and a year ahead of the McKeevers. He did weight training with the brothers at a time when this was discouraged, and the three worked together after practice to hone their football skills. He presented McKeever at McKeever's induction into USC's Athletics Hall of Fame.

== Professional career ==
McKeever's work at linebacker got the attention of professional football scouts.

McKeever was a first round pick in the 1961 NFL draft by the Los Angeles Rams, the fourth overall selection. The Rams also selected Mike McKeever in the 13th round (though he would never play in the NFL). McKeever was also taken in the third round of the 1961 American Football League draft by the San Diego Chargers. McKeever chose the Rams, and played in the NFL from 1961 to 1973.

He spent 1961–66 with the Rams, 1967 with the Minnesota Vikings, 1968–70 with the Washington Redskins, 1971–72 back with the Rams and finally 1973 with the Philadelphia Eagles before retiring. During his professional career, he was coached by five members of the Pro Football Hall of Fame: George Allen, Bud Grant, Otto Graham, Bob Waterfield and Vince Lombardi. (Graham and Waterfield were inducted as quarterbacks, not coaches).

=== Los Angeles Rams (first stint) ===
In his rookie year, McKeever played in only three games, but in 1962, he started 13 out of 14 games at linebacker, with two interceptions. In 1963, McKeever continued at linebacker, but the Rams began using him as a tight end, catching 11 passes for 152 yards (13.8 yards per catch). He became a full-time tight end the next three years for the Rams, catching career bests 41 passes for 582 yards in 1964, and 44 passes for 542 yards and four touchdowns in 1965.

In 1966, he made his only Pro Bowl appearance, being selected as a tight end. However, on August 18, 1966, McKeever was a passenger in Rams' quarterback Roman Gabriel's car and lost the ring finger on his right hand when Gabriel crashed into a parked car. McKeever only wound up playing in 11 games that year, starting seven, with only 23 receptions. After the 1966 season, Allen traded McKeever and a first round draft choice (who would be future Hall of Famer Alan Page) to the Minnesota Vikings for Tommy Mason.

=== Minnesota Vikings ===
In 1967, he played one final year at starting tight end while playing for the Minnesota Vikings, catching 14 passes for 184 yards during Grant's first season as coach. These were the last receptions of his career. After the 1967 season, the Vikings traded McKeever to Washington for future Hall of Fame safety Paul Krause.

=== Washington Redskins ===
In his first year with Washington, Graham's last as coach, McKeever did not start any games, and was a backup tight end. In 1969, under new coach Vince Lombardi, he started four games at middle linebacker. In 1970, after Bill Austin took over as coach for the deceased Lombardi, he started 12 games at middle linebacker. Allen, McKeever's former Rams coach, was hired to take over in Washington for the 1971 season, and he traded McKeever back to Los Angeles.

=== Los Angeles Rams (second stint) ===
McKeever was traded along with first- and third-round selections in 1971 (10th and 63rd overall–Isiah Robertson and Dave Elmendorf respectively) included first- and third-round selections in 1971 (10th and 63rd overall–Isiah Robertson and Dave Elmendorf respectively) and third, fourth, fifth, sixth and seventh rounders in 1972 (73rd, 99th, 125th, 151st and 177th overall–to New England Patriots, traded to Philadelphia Eagles for Joe Carollo, Bob Christiansen, Texas Southern defensive tackle Eddie Herbert and to New York Giants respectively) from the Redskins to the Rams for Jack Pardee, Maxie Baughan, Myron Pottios, Diron Talbert, John Wilbur, Jeff Jordan and a 1971 fifth-round pick (124th overall–traded to Green Bay Packers for Boyd Dowler) on January 28, 1971.

McKeever started all 28 games from 1971-72 at middle linebacker for the Rams, coached by Tommy Prothro in both seasons. In 1971, he had four interceptions and two quarterback sacks, and two more interceptions in 1972. Ron Mix has stated that if McKeever would have played his entire NFL career as a linebacker, then McKeever would have made it to the Pro Football Hall of Fame.

=== Philadelphia Eagles ===
In 1973, McKeever played his final NFL season in Philadelphia, starting 11 games at middle linebacker. He had three fumble recoveries and one sack. Over his entire NFL career, he had nine interceptions and nine sacks.

== California State Assembly race ==
In 1974, about a year after his NFL playing career ended, McKeever made a long shot bid for the California State Assembly as a Republican. Then incumbent John Quimby was defeated in the Democratic primary by Richard H. Robinson, who went on to beat McKeever by more than 21 points in what was then a Democratic-leaning Orange County district.

== Personal life ==
Mike died on August 24, 1967, after a car accident that left him in a coma for 22 months. Thirty-six years later, McKeever said "'There's not a day that passes that I don't think of him. He was part of me. He will always be part of me.'"

Both he and his brother appeared in the 1962 Three Stooges comedy film The Three Stooges Meet Hercules playing the Siamese Cyclops twins Ajax and Argo. The brothers also appeared in Disney's 1961 film, The Absent Minded Professor. They played slaves in Spartacus, and policemen in Elmer Gantry. Marlin appeared with several of his Los Angeles Rams teammates as football players in the 1965 Perry Mason episode, "The Case of the 12th Wildcat."

In 1974, McKeever was director of player relations for the World Football League, and vice president for player administration for the league's Southern California Sun.

After the NFL, McKeever became a stockbroker and insurance executive. He also became the leader of the Trojan Football Alumni Club and close friend of recent USC coaches, including Pete Carroll.

McKeever's niece Teri McKeever, Mike McKeever's daughter, was an All-American swimmer at USC, and later became the women's swimming and diving coach at the University of California. Teri McKeever was the first woman to serve as a U.S. Olympics swimming coach.

== Death ==
On October 26, 2006, Marlin McKeever fell at his home and slipped into a coma shortly thereafter. Doctors in the intensive care unit at St. Mary Medical Center in Long Beach, California, reported a blood clot on his brain. He died from his injuries the next day. His interment was in Culver City's Holy Cross Cemetery.
