= Tony Romeo (disambiguation) =

Tony Romeo (1938–1995) was an American songwriter.

Tony Romeo may also refer to:

- Tony Romeo (American football) (1938–1996), American football player
- Tony Romeo (Neighbours), a character in the Australian soap opera Neighbours

== See also ==
- Tony Romo (born 1980), American football player
