= List of Lake Forest Foresters in the NFL draft =

This is a list of Lake Forest Foresters players in the NFL draft.

== Key ==
| B | Back | K | Kicker | NT | Nose tackle |
| C | Center | LB | Linebacker | FB | Fullback |
| DB | Defensive back | P | Punter | HB | Halfback |
| DE | Defensive end | QB | Quarterback | WR | Wide receiver |
| DT | Defensive tackle | RB | Running back | G | Guard |
| E | End | T | Offensive tackle | TE | Tight end |

| = Pro Bowler |
| = Hall of Famer |

== Selections ==
| Year | Round | Pick | Overall | Player | Team | Position |
|---|---|---|---|---|---|---|
| 1961 | 20 | 9 | 275 | Tom Lewis | Detroit Lions | B |
| 1967 | 12 | 13 | 303 | Dick Kolonski | Kansas City Chiefs | C |
