= 1960 All-Southern Conference football team =

The 1960 All-Southern Conference football team consists of American football players chosen by the Associated Press (AP) and United Press (UP) for the All-Southern Conference football team for the 1960 college football season.

== All-Southern Conference selections ==
=== Backs ===
- Howard Dyer, VMI (AP-1)
- Earl Stoudt, Richmond (AP-1)
- Tom Campbell, Furman (AP-1)
- Don Kern, VMI (AP-1)
- Stinson Jones, VMI (AP-2)
- Earley Eastburn, The Citadel (AP-2)
- Roger Hale, William & Mary (AP-2)
- Warren Price, Virginia Tech (AP-2)

=== Ends ===
- Bob Coolbaugh, Richmond (AP-1)
- Andy Guida, George Washington (AP-1)
- Dick Willard, VMI (AP-2)
- Danny House, Davidson (AP-2)

=== Tackles ===
- Harry Rakowski, The Citadel (AP-1)
- Allen Whittier, Virginia Tech (AP-1)
- Don Oakes, Virginia Tech (AP-2)
- Bob Buffman, Richmond (AP-2)

=== Guards ===
- Mike Zeno, Virginia Tech (AP-1)
- Lou Shuba, VMI (AP-1)
- Bill Haeberlein, VMI (AP-2)
- Wayne Woolwine, William & Mary (AP-2)

=== Centers ===
- George Garrison, The Citadel (AP-1)
- Lee Badgett, VMI (AP-2)

== Key ==
AP = Associated Press

== See also ==
- 1960 College Football All-America Team
