= John Timu =

John Timu may refer to:

- John Timu (American football) (born 1992), American football coach and former linebacker
- John Timu (rugby) (born 1969), New Zealand rugby footballer
