= 1960 All-Pacific Coast football team =

American all-star college football team

The 1960 All-Pacific Coast football team consists of American football players chosen by the Associated Press (AP) and the United Press International (UPI) as the best college football players by position in the Pacific Coast region during the 1960 college football season.

The AP team was selected by members of the AP West Coast Board from teams rated "major" by the NCAA.

The UPI selections included players from "major" and "minor" colleges. As part of its selection process, the UPI also presented awards to Jim Owens of Washington as coach of the year, Hugh Campbell of Washington State as lineman of the year, and Billy Kilmer of UCLA as back of the year.

The 1960 Washington Huskies football team won the AAWU championship and was ranked No. 6 in the final AP Poll. The Huskies had five players who were named to the first team by the AP and/or UPI: guard Chuck Allen (AP-1, UPI-1); center Roy McKasson (AP-1, UPI-1); backs Don McKeta (AP-1) and George Fleming (UPI-1); and tackle Kurt Gegner (UPI-1). McKasson was also selected as a first-team All-American by the AP, Newspaper Enterprise Association (NEA) and Football Writers Association of America (FWAA).

== Selections ==
=== Quarterbacks ===
- Terry Baker, Oregon State (AP-1 [back]; UPI-1)
- Dave Grosz, Oregon (AP-1; UPI-2)
- Mel Melin, Washington State (AP-2; UPI-2)

=== Backs ===
- Billy Kilmer, UCLA (AP-1; UPI-1)
- Don McKeta, Washington (AP-1)
- Skip Face, Stanford (AP-2)
- George Fleming, Washington (AP-2; UPI-1)
- Keith Lincoln, Washington State (AP-2; UPI-3)
- Dale Messer, Fresno State (UPI-1)
- Charley Fuller, San Francisco State (UPI-2)
- Johnny Johnson, San Jose State (UPI-2)
- Simpson, San Francisco State (UPI-3)
- Mitchell, Washington (UPI-3)
- Nolan Jones, Arizona State (UPI-3)

=== Ends ===
- Hugh Campbell, Washington State (AP-1; UPI-1)
- Marlin McKeever, USC (AP-1; UPI-2)
- Pat Claridge, Washington (AP-2; UPI-3)
- Marv Luster, UCLA (AP-2; UPI-1)
- John Murio, Whitworth (UPI-2)
- George Van Vliet, USC (UPI-2)

=== Tackles ===
- Steve Barnett, Oregon (AP-1; UPI-1)
- Steve Bauwens, UCLA (AP-1)
- Kurt Gegner, Washington (AP-2; UPI-1)
- Mike Kline, Oregon State (AP-2; UPI-2)
- Vester Flanagan, Humboldt State (UPI-2)
- Ron Puckett, Los Angeles State (UPI-3)
- Dean Hinshaw, Stanford (UPI-3)

=== Guards ===
- Chuck Allen, Washington (AP-1; UPI-1)
- Dave Urell, Oregon (AP-1)
- Carl Kammerer, College of the Pacific (AP-2; UPI-2)
- Jack Metcalf, UCLA (AP-2; UPI-1)
- Doug Brown, Fresno State (UPI-2)
- Marv Cisneros, Willamette (UPI-3)
- Bill Kinnune, Washington (UPI-3)

=== Centers ===
- Roy McKasson, Washington (AP-1; UPI-1)
- Dick Carlsen, California (AP-2; UPI-3)
- Harry Baldwin, UCLA (UPI-2)

== Key ==
AP = Associated Press

UPI = United Press International

Bold = Consensus first-team selection of both the AP and UPI

== See also ==
- 1960 College Football All-America Team
