= List of Presbyterian Blue Hose in the NFL draft =

This is a list of Presbyterian Blue Hose football players in the NFL draft.

== Key ==
| B | Back | K | Kicker | NT | Nose tackle |
| C | Center | LB | Linebacker | FB | Fullback |
| DB | Defensive back | P | Punter | HB | Halfback |
| DE | Defensive end | QB | Quarterback | WR | Wide receiver |
| DT | Defensive tackle | RB | Running back | G | Guard |
| E | End | T | Offensive tackle | TE | Tight end |

| = Pro Bowler |
| = Hall of Famer |

== Selections ==
| Year | Round | Pick | Overall | Player | Team | Position |
|---|---|---|---|---|---|---|
| 1944 | 19 | 1 | 187 | Jack Adams | Chicago Cardinals | E |
| 1944 | 22 | 4 | 223 | Hank Caver | Pittsburgh Steelers | B |
| 1958 | 14 | 12 | 169 | Ken Webb | Detroit Lions | B |
| 1960 | 7 | 11 | 83 | Bobby Waters | San Francisco 49ers | QB |
| 1960 | 19 | 11 | 227 | Bobby Pate | San Francisco 49ers | B |
| 1961 | 19 | 1 | 253 | Bill Hill | Minnesota Vikings | RB |
| 1962 | 18 | 14 | 253 | Bob Joiner | Green Bay Packers | QB |
| 1969 | 15 | 12 | 376 | Dan Eckstein | Green Bay Packers | DB |
| 2012 | 6 | 7 | 177 | Justin Bethel | Arizona Cardinals | S |
