= 1959 All-Pacific Coast football team =

American all-star college football team

The 1959 All-Pacific Coast football team consists of American football players chosen by the Associated Press (AP) and the United Press International (UPI) as the best college football players by position in the Pacific Coast region during the 1959 college football season.

The 1959 Washington Huskies football team won the Athletic Association of Western Universities championship and was ranked No. 8 in the final AP Poll. Three Washington players received first-team honors: quarterback Bob Schloredt; tackle Kurt Gegner; and guard Chuck Allen. Schloredt was also selected by the AP as the first-team quarterback on the 1959 All-America college football team.

USC led all other teams with four first-team selections: end Marlin McKeever; tackles Ron Mix and Dan Ficca; and guard Mike McKeever.

== Selections ==
=== Quarterbacks ===
- Bob Schloredt, Washington (AP-1; UPI-1)
- Dave Grosz, Oregon (AP-2)
- Dick Norman, Stanford (UPI-2)

=== Halfbacks ===
- Keith Lincoln, Washington State (AP-1; UPI-1)
- Willie West, Oregon (AP-1; UPI-2)
- Dick Bass, College of the Pacific (AP-2; UPI-1)
- Jerry Traynham, USC (AP-2; UPI-2)
- George Fleming, Washington (UPI-2)

=== Fullbacks ===
- Ray Smith, UCLA (AP-1; UPI-1)
- Walt Arnold, California (AP-2)

=== Ends ===
- Chris Burford, Stanford (AP-1; UPI-1)
- Marlin McKeever, USC (AP-1; UPI-1)
- Gail Cogdill, Washington State (AP-2; UPI-2)
- Alden Kimbrough, Oregon (AP-2)
- Marv Luster, UCLA (UPI-2)

=== Tackles ===
- Ron Mix, USC (AP-1; UPI-2)
- Kurt Gegner, Washington (AP-2; UPI-1)
- Frank Sally, California (AP-1)
- Dan Ficca, USC (UPI-1)
- Gary Finneran, USC (AP-2; UPI-2)

=== Guards ===
- Chuck Allen, Washington (AP-1; UPI-1)
- Mike McKeever, USC (AP-1; UPI-1)
- Bill Berry, Washington State (AP-2; UPI-2)
- Dave Urell, Oregon (AP-2)
- Al Bansavage, USC (UPI-2)

=== Centers ===
- Bob Peterson, Oregon (AP-1; UPI-2)
- Harry Baldwin, UCLA (UPI-1)
- Roy McKasson, Washington (AP-2)

== Key ==
AP = Associated Press, selections made by AP writers on the West Coast

UPI = United Press International

Bold = Consensus first-team selection of both the AP and UPI

== See also ==
- 1959 College Football All-America Team
