= Dick Schnell =

American gridiron football player (born c. 1940)

Profile
- Positions: Linebacker, Center, End

Personal information
- Born: c. 1940 (age 85–86); Laramie, Wyoming, U.S.
- Died: October 20, 2023; Bellevue, Washington, U.S.
- Listed height: 6 ft 3 in (1.91 m)
- Listed weight: 225 lb (102 kg)

Career information
- College: Wyoming
- NFL draft: 1961: 19th round, 260th overall pick

Career history
- 1961–1962: Montreal Alouettes
- 1963–1966: Saskatchewan Roughriders

Richard Schnell (born c. 1940) is an American former professional football player who played for the Montreal Alouettes and Saskatchewan Roughriders of the Canadian Football League (CFL). He played college football at the University of Wyoming. Schnell was drafted in the 19th round by the St. Louis Cardinals in the 1961 NFL draft, but played only in the CFL.
