= Marcus Turner (American football) =

American football player (born 1966)

No. 23
- Position: Cornerback

Personal information
- Born: January 13, 1966 (age 60); Harbor City, California, U.S.
- Listed height: 6 ft 0 in (1.83 m)
- Listed weight: 190 lb (86 kg)

Career information
- High school: Jordan (Long Beach, California)
- College: UCLA
- NFL draft: 1989: 11th round, 283rd overall pick

Career history
- Kansas City Chiefs (1989)*; Phoenix Cardinals (1989–1991); New York Jets (1992–1995); Green Bay Packers (1996)*
- * Offseason or practice squad member only

Career NFL statistics
- Tackles: 115
- Sacks: 1
- Interceptions: 8
- Stats at Pro Football Reference

Marcus Jared Turner (born January 13, 1966) is an American former professional football player who was a cornerback in the National Football League (NFL). He played college football for the UCLA Bruins and was selected by the Kansas City Chiefs in the 11th round of the 1989 NFL draft with the 283rd overall pick. He played seven seasons for the Phoenix Cardinals and New York Jets.

Turner attended Jordan High School, in Long Beach, California.
