= Travon Bryant =

American professional basketball coach and former player

California Golden Bears
- Title: Assistant coach
- League: Atlantic Coast Conference

Personal information
- Born: February 5, 1983 (age 43) Cerritos, California, U.S.
- Listed height: 6 ft 9 in (2.06 m)
- Listed weight: 245 lb (111 kg)

Career information
- High school: Jordan (Long Beach, California)
- College: Missouri (2000–2004)
- NBA draft: 2004: undrafted
- Playing career: 2004–2015
- Position: Power forward / center
- Coaching career: 2015–present

Career history

Playing
- 2004–2005: Iraklis Thessaloniki
- 2005–2006: Kolossos Rodou
- 2006: Benetton Treviso
- 2006–2007: Skyliners Frankfurt
- 2007–2008: Maroussi
- 2008–2009: AEK Athens
- 2009–2010: Paniónios
- 2010–2011: Pau-Orthez
- 2011: Budivelnyk Kyiv
- 2011–2012: Le Mans Sarthe
- 2012–2014: Cholet Basket
- 2014–2015: EWE Baskets Oldenburg
- 2014–2015: Estudiantes Concordia
- 2015: Akita Northern Happinets

Coaching
- 2015–2017: Oklahoma City Blue (assistant)
- 2017–2020: Brooklyn Nets (assistant)
- 2021–2023: Raptors 905 (assistant)
- 2023–present: California (women's assistant)

Career highlights
- German Cup champion (2015); Ukrainian League champion (2011); Italian League champion (2006); Italian Supercup champion (2006); McDonald's All-American (2000); Third-team Parade All-American (2000)

Travon Levar Bryant (born February 5, 1983), nicknamed T, is an American professional basketball coach and former player. He played college basketball for the University of Missouri.

== Amateur career ==
Bryant attended David Starr Jordan High School in Long Beach, California where he was coached by Ron Massey Sr. He was a McDonald's High School All-American who played his college basketball under coach Quin Snyder with the Missouri Tigers at the University of Missouri from 2000 to 2004. Bryant contributed to Missouri's success as a role player in his four years there. Bryant made four three-pointers against the University of Illinois's Fighting Illini in the Mizzou-Illini rivalry game in St. Louis in his senior year.

== College statistics ==
Year	Team	GP	GS	MPG	FG%	3P%	FT%	RPG	APG	SPG	BPG	PPG
2000–01	Missouri	24	0		.485	.000	.281	3.5	0.4	0.3	0.6	3.0
2001–02	Missouri	36	25	18.6	.576	.462	.510	5.4	0.8	0.6	0.8	6.3
2002–03	Missouri	33	26	25.7	.479	.360	.561	5.85	1.09	0.85	1.24	8.91
2003–04	Missouri	30	29	26.2	.515	.407	.718	6.57	1.70	0.70	1.50	10.57
Career		123	81	23.3	.514	.393	.559	5.4	1.0	0.7	1.0	8.80

=== NCAA Awards & Honors ===
- All-Big 12 Honorable Mention – 2004

== Coaching career ==
In November 2015, Bryant joined the Oklahoma City Blue as an assistant coach. In June 2017, he joined Brooklyn Nets as an assistant coach working with player development.

== Career statistics ==
Legend
GP	Games played	GS	Games started	MPG	Minutes per game
FG%	Field goal percentage	3P%	3-point field goal percentage	FT%	Free throw percentage
RPG	Rebounds per game	APG	Assists per game	SPG	Steals per game
BPG	Blocks per game	PPG	Points per game	**Bold**	Career high

=== Regular season ===
Year	Team	GP	GS	MPG	FG%	3P%	FT%	RPG	APG	SPG	BPG	PPG
2004–05	Iraklis	25		24.8	.467	.286	.560	6.4	1.1	0.7	0.6	10.2
2005–06	Rodou	24		31.4	.508	.419	.554	7.4	1.3	1.1	1.1	14.5
2005–06	Treviso	16	2	10.9	.453	.556	.588	2.56	0.56	0.50	0.19	4.56
2006–07	Frankfurt	28	28	29.3	.511	.286	.617	7.75	1.79	1.07	0.79	14.71
2007–08	Maroussi	22		23.7	.576	.346	.522	5.1	1.0	0.9	0.4	10.3
2008–09	AEK	23		27.3	.457	.245	.711	6.8	1.2	0.8	0.8	11.6
2009–10	Panionios	21		25.7	.535	.423	.667	7.0	1.1	1.1	0.5	9.9
2010–11	Pau	21	16	26.0	.509	.222	.607	5.38	1.95	0.86	0.33	9.48
2011–12	Kyiv/Le Mans	40	5	13.9	.541	.312	.745	3.08	0.70	0.45	0.28	5.40
2012–13	Cholet	36	17	20.2	.520	.333	.811	4.06	1.11	1.08	0.25	9.50
2013–14	Oldenburg	8	5	12.2	.345	.500	.667	1.38	0.88	0.50	0.00	4.62
2014–15	Concordia	11	9	24.8	.437	.000	.610	8.00	1.09	0.45	0.82	9.18
2014–15	Akita	18		19.7	.444	.250	.500	6.5	1.6	0.5	1.1	6.2

=== Playoffs ===
Year	Team	GP	GS	MPG	FG%	3P%	FT%	RPG	APG	SPG	BPG	PPG
2005–06	Treviso	13		10.7	.472	.500	.571	1.9	0.4	0.5	0.2	4.1
2007–08	Marousi	13		21.7	.607	.625	.625	4.9	1.2	0.8	0.6	7.2
2009–10	Panionios	2		23.0	.583	.500	.500	5.5	1.0	0.5	0.0	9.0
2011–12	Le Mans	7		11.4	.571	.800	.667	2.0	0.7	0.3	0.1	6.3
