= Chuck Allen =

American football player (1939–2016)

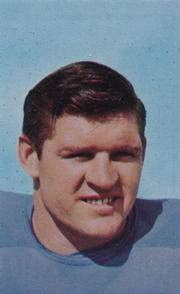
- Allen c. 1969

No. 50, 58, 54
- Position: Linebacker

Personal information
- Born: September 7, 1939; Cle Elum, Washington, U.S.
- Died: December 14, 2016 (aged 77); Issaquah, Washington, U.S.
- Listed height: 6 ft 1 in (1.85 m)
- Listed weight: 225 lb (102 kg)

Career information
- High school: Cle Elum
- College: Washington (1957–1960)
- NFL draft: 1961: 17th round, 228th overall pick
- AFL draft: 1961: 28th round, 224th overall pick

Career history
- San Diego Chargers (1961–1969); Pittsburgh Steelers (1970–1971); Philadelphia Eagles (1972)

Awards and highlights
- AFL champion (1963); Second-team All-AFL (1962); 2× AFL All-Star (1963, 1964); Los Angeles Chargers Hall of Fame; San Diego Chargers 50th Anniversary Team; 2× First-team All-PCC (1959, 1960)

Career NFL/AFL statistics
- Interceptions: 28
- Interception yards: 352
- Fumble recoveries: 7
- Sacks: 1
- Defensive touchdowns: 2
- Stats at Pro Football Reference

Charles Richard Allen (September 7, 1939 – December 14, 2016) was an American professional football player who was a linebacker in the American Football League (AFL) with the San Diego Chargers, and later the National Football League (NFL) with the Pittsburgh Steelers and Philadelphia Eagles. He played in four AFL Championship games (1961, 1963–1965), and was a member of the Chargers' 1963 AFL Championship team. Allen was an All-AFL player in 1962, and an AFL All-Star in 1963 and 1964. He played college football for the Washington Huskies.

== After football ==
Allen went on to serve as the Vice President of Football Operations for the Seattle Seahawks for 20 years. The high school football stadium of Cle Elum Roslyn High School in Allen's hometown of Cle Elum, Washington is named in his honor: "Chuck Allen Field."

He died on December 14, 2016, at home.

== See also ==
- List of American Football League players
