= Gail Cogdill =

American football player (1937–2016)

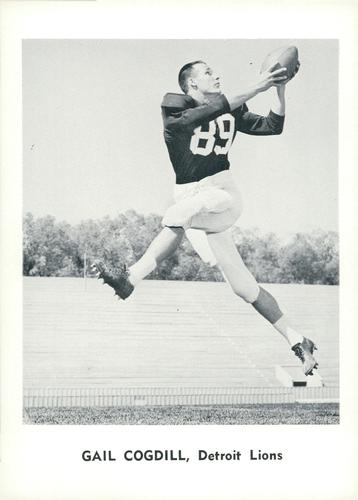
- Cogdill in 1961

No. 89, 80, 15
- Position: Split end

Personal information
- Born: April 7, 1937; Worland, Wyoming, U.S.
- Died: October 20, 2016 (aged 79); Spokane, Washington, U.S.
- Listed height: 6 ft 3 in (1.91 m)
- Listed weight: 200 lb (91 kg)

Career information
- High school: Lewis & Clark (Spokane, Washington)
- College: Washington State (1957–1959)
- NFL draft: 1960: 6th round, 63rd overall pick
- AFL draft: 1960

Career history

Playing
- Detroit Lions (1960–1968); Baltimore Colts (1968); Atlanta Falcons (1969–1970)

Coaching
- Portland Storm (1974) Receivers coach

Awards and highlights
- NFL champion (1968); NFL Rookie of the Year (1960); 3× Second-team All-Pro (1962–1964); 3× Pro Bowl (1960, 1962, 1963); Detroit Lions 75th Anniversary Team; Detroit Lions All-Time Team; Second-team All-PCC (1959)

Career NFL statistics
- Receptions: 356
- Receiving yards: 5,696
- Receiving touchdowns: 34
- Stats at Pro Football Reference

Gail Ross Cogdill (April 7, 1937 – October 20, 2016) was an American professional football split end. He played college football for the Washington State Cougars from 1957 to 1959 and was selected by the Detroit Lions in the 1960 NFL draft of the National Football League (NFL). He played for the Lions, the Baltimore Colts, and the Atlanta Falcons. He won the NFL Rookie of the Year Award in 1960 and played in three Pro Bowls.

== Early life ==
Cogdill was born in Worland, Wyoming, in 1937. As a boy, he moved with his family to Spokane, Washington, and attended Lewis and Clark High School in that city. He began playing football during his junior year of high school. After losing every game in his junior year, he helped lead Lewis and Clark to the state championship in his senior year. He also competed in track and basketball and earned all-state honors in all three sports.

== College football ==
Cogdill attended Washington State College on a football scholarship. He played college football as an end, both on offense and defense, for the Washington State Cougars football team under head coach Jim Sutherland from 1957 to 1959. On September 27, 1958, he set an all-time, single-game record by gaining 252 receiving yards on seven receptions against Ara Parseghian's Northwestern Wildcats. After his senior year, he was selected by the Associated Press as a second-team player on the 1959 All-Pacific Coast football team. He was also selected to play in the 1960 East–West Shrine Game, Senior Bowl, and Chicago College All-Star Game. He also competed in track at Washington State and won a Pacific Coast Conference hurdles championship.

== Professional career ==
=== Detroit Lions ===
Cogdill was selected by the Detroit Lions in the sixth round, 63rd overall pick, of the 1960 NFL draft. He was offered more money ($7,000) by the Dallas Texans of the American Football League, but he signed with the Lions because he wanted to play in "the big league."

In May 1960, Lions coach George Wilson touted Cogdill as "one of the top receivers to come into professional football in a long time." As a rookie in 1960, he appeared in all 12 games for the Lions at the split end position and caught 43 passes for 642 yards. He was selected by both the United Press International and The Sporting News for the NFL Rookie of the Year Award. He was also selected to play in the 1961 Pro Bowl.

In 1961, Cogdill had a strong second year with 45 passes for 956 yards and six touchdowns. After a loss to Green Bay in November 1961, head coach George Wilson said Cogdill would become the best receiver in the NFL and described one of his catches as follows: "On the first catch, he reached behind his back with his left hand and pulled in the ball while in full stride. I think the whole stadium turned upside down with that one."

Cogdill had his best season in 1962, catching 53 passes for 991 yards and seven touchdowns. He continued to develop a reputation for circus catches. Sports writer George Puscas later wrote about Cogdill's acrobatic catches and recalled: "He was the only football player I've ever seen who caused teammates to interrupt their own work to watch him do his." After the 1962 season, Cogdill received second-team All-NFL honors from the Associated Press (AP) and United Press International (UPI). He was also selected to play in the 1963 Pro Bowl.

In 1963, he caught 48 passes for 945 yards and a career-high 10 touchdowns. He was selected to play in his third Pro Bowl and was selected by the AP for the second consecutive year as a second-team All-NFL player.

On November 1, 1964, he had the best game of his career against the Los Angeles Rams, catching seven passes for 165 yards. Three weeks later, he suffered a shoulder injury that required surgery and resulted in his missing the remainder of the season. Cogdill totaled 45 catches for 665 yards in 11 games in 1964. At the end of the 1964 season, Cogdill criticized the Lions' coaching staff, expressed a desire to be traded, and added: "I feel dead around here. I used to enjoy playing football but not anymore. I've lost all my incentive."

Cogdill fractured his right kneecap during the preseason in 1965. He remained with the Lions for four additional years, but he continued to be impaired by a bad knee, and never achieved the same level of performance, totaling 247 receiving yards in 1965, 411 in 1966, 322 in 1967, and 42 in 1968. He was placed on waivers by the Lions in late October 1968.

Cogdill played nine seasons with the Lions and, at the time of his departure, held two franchise records with 325 receptions and 5,221 receiving yards. He currently ranks seventh in receptions and fifth in receiving yards in Lions history.

=== Baltimore Colts ===
In early November 1968, Cogdill was signed by Don Shula to play for the Baltimore Colts. The Colts won the 1968 NFL championship and lost to the New York Jets in Super Bowl III. Cogdill appeared in five games for the Colts, but made no catches. Cogdill became the first Washington State Cougar to play on a Super Bowl team. The Colts cut Cogdill in September 1969, prior to the start of the regular season.

=== Atlanta Falcons ===
In September 1969, Cogdill was signed by the Atlanta Falcons. He appeared in 15 games for the 1969 Falcons, 13 as a starter, and caught 24 passes for 374 yards and five touchdowns. In 1970, he appeared in 15 games, but lost his starting job, after dropping two consecutive passes in an October 1970 loss to the Denver Broncos. He caught only seven passes for 101 yards in 1970. In June 1971, Cogdill announced his retirement from the NFL.

== Family and later years ==
Cogdill was married twice and had six children. After retiring from football, he spent five years mining for gold. He then had a career in sales.

Cogdill underwent bypass surgery in 2002 after a virus damaged his heart. In 2012, his heart was failing, but he was ineligible for a heart transplant at age 75. He turned to the crowdfunding site, GoFundMe.com in an effort to raise $35,000 to pay for experimental stem cell treatment in the Bahamas. He died on October 20, 2016, from complications of heart failure, kidney failure and dementia.

== NFL career statistics ==
Legend
	Won NFL championship
	Led the league
**Bold**	Career high

=== Regular season ===
Year	Team	Games		Receiving				
Year	Team	GP	GS	Rec	Yds	Avg	Lng	TD
1960	DET	12	11	12	276	23.0	74	3
1961	DET	**14**	**14**	45	956	**21.2**	**84**	6
1962	DET	**14**	**14**	**53**	**991**	18.7	72	7
1963	DET	**14**	**14**	48	945	19.7	70	**10**
1964	DET	11	11	45	665	14.8	57	2
1965	DET	9	8	20	247	12.4	33	0
1966	DET	**14**	**14**	47	411	8.7	21	1
1967	DET	12	6	21	322	15.3	52	1
1968	DET	3	3	3	42	14.0	20	0
1968	BAL	5	0	Did not record any stats				
1969	ATL	13	12	24	374	15.6	52	5
1970	ATL	6	5	7	101	14.4	30	1
Career		127	112	356	5,696	16.0	84	34
