= Dan Ficca =

American football player (born 1939)

No. 69, 61
- Position: Guard

Personal information
- Born: February 7, 1939 (age 87); Atlas, Pennsylvania, U.S.
- Listed height: 6 ft 1 in (1.85 m)
- Listed weight: 245 lb (111 kg)

Career information
- High school: Mount Carmel (PA)
- College: USC
- NFL draft: 1961: 4th round, 53rd overall pick
- AFL draft: 1961: 29th round, 230th overall pick

Career history
- San Diego Chargers (1961)*; Oakland Raiders (1962); New York Jets (1963-1966)
- * Offseason or practice squad member only

Awards and highlights
- Second-team All-American (1959); 2× First-team All-PCC (1958, 1959)

Career AFL statistics
- Games played: 70
- Games started: 30
- Stats at Pro Football Reference

Daniel Robert Ficca (born February 7, 1939) is an American former professional football player who was a guard for five seasons with the Oakland Raiders and the New York Jets of the American Football League (AFL).
