= E. A. Sims =

American gridiron football player (1937–2010)

No. 78, 74, 70
- Position: End

Personal information
- Born: February 10, 1937; Abilene, Texas, U.S.
- Died: August 5, 2010 (aged 72); Fort Worth, Texas, U.S.
- Listed height: 6 ft 3 in (1.91 m)
- Listed weight: 215 lb (98 kg)

Career information
- College: New Mexico State
- NFL draft: 1961: 15th round, 203rd overall pick
- AFL draft: 1961: 24th round, 185th overall pick

Career history
- 1962–1968: Edmonton Eskimos
- 1968–1970: BC Lions

Awards and highlights
- 2× CFL All-Star (1966, 1967); 3× CFL West All-Star (1965, 1966, 1967)

E. A. Sims, Jr. (also called Ed, and Zeke; February 10, 1937 – August 5, 2010) was an American professional football end who played in the Canadian Football League (CFL) for the Edmonton Eskimos and B.C. Lions. He was presented with a ring of honor for his achievements at New Mexico State University.

== Early life ==
Sims was born in Abilene, Texas, and was very active in sports in junior high and high school. He attended Cisco Junior College in Cisco, Texas, where he played on their football team, The Wranglers. He was made all star three years in a row and also received an outstanding player award. He later played football for the New Mexico State University Aggies in Las Cruces, New Mexico, where in December 1960 he helped defeat Utah State to win the Sun Bowl. During his college career playing for the Aggies, he received another outstanding player award.

== Professional career ==
In March 1961 Sims was selected in the 15th round by the Baltimore Colts during the 15th round of the NFL draft. In July 1961 he was traded to the Pittsburgh Steelers for a future draft choice. After sustaining a knee injury, Sims refused to report and in March 1962 he was signed by the Edmonton Eskimos, where he was to play for 7 seasons. In 1966 and in 1967 Sims was selected as a CFL All-Star. In 1968, Sims was cut from the Eskimos following the signing of Ed Marcontell, but was subsequently signed B.C Lions, where he played until 1970 when he retired from the league.
