= Ken Gregory (American football) =

American football player (born 1937)

No. 88, 80, 84
- Position: Split end

Personal information
- Born: February 1, 1937 (age 89); United States
- Listed height: 6 ft 1 in (1.85 m)
- Listed weight: 190 lb (86 kg)

Career information
- High school: Whittier (Whittier, California)
- College: Whittier
- NFL draft: 1961: 4th round, 49th overall pick

Career history
- Baltimore Colts (1961); Philadelphia Eagles (1962); New York Jets (1963)
- Stats at Pro Football Reference

Kenneth E. Gregory (born February 1, 1937) is an American former professional football split end who played in the National Football League (NFL) and American Football League (AFL). He played college football for the Whittier Poets and was selected by the Colts in the fourth round of the 1961 NFL draft.

== Early life ==
Kenneth E. Gregory was born on February 1, 1937, in the United States. He participated in high school football and track at Whittier High School in Whittier, California. He set a high jump record that stood for 20 years. Gregory graduated from Whittier High in 1955.

== College career ==
Gregory played junior college football at Fullerton Junior College and Cerritos College. He transferred to Whittier College in 1959, and played college football for the Whittier Poets from 1959 to 1960. During the 1960 college football season, he led all major and small colleges in both receptions (74) and receiving yards (1,018). Gregory's 74 catches were the most in college football history at the time. He was later inducted into Whittier College's athletics hall of fame.

== Professional career ==
Gregory was selected by the Baltimore Colts in the fourth round, with the 49th overall pick, of the 1961 NFL draft and by the Houston Oilers in the 24th round, with the 191st overall pick, of the 1961 AFL draft. He chose to sign with the Colts on December 28, 1960. He played in all 14 games, mostly on special teams, for Baltimore during the 1961 season as a reserve split end and did not record any statistics. Gregory re-signed with the team on June 6, 1962. On September 6, 1962, it was reported that he had been waived.

Gregory signed with the NFL's Philadelphia Eagles on November 30, 1962. He appeared in two games for the Eagles in 1962. He was released on September 3, 1963.

Gregory was signed by the New York Jets of the American Football League on September 7, 1963. He played in all 14 games, starting three, for New York during the 1963 season and caught nine passes for 90 yards. He became a free agent after the season.

== Personal life ==
Gregory was later an assistant football coach at Cerritos College, the University of Arizona, and Long Beach City College.
