= Dale Messer =

American football player (1937–2024)

No. 29
- Position: Wide receiver

Personal information
- Born: August 6, 1937; Lemoore, California, U.S.
- Died: February 27, 2024 (aged 86)
- Listed height: 5 ft 10 in (1.78 m)
- Listed weight: 175 lb (79 kg)

Career information
- High school: Lemoore
- College: Fresno State (1958–1960)
- NFL draft: 1961: 4th round, 52nd overall pick
- AFL draft: 1961: 13th round, 103rd overall pick

Career history
- San Francisco 49ers (1961–1965)

Awards and highlights
- First-team All-PCC (1960); Fresno State Bulldogs No. 21 retired

Career NFL statistics
- Receptions: 12
- Receiving yards: 176
- Stats at Pro Football Reference

Lindy Dale Messer (August 6, 1937 – February 27, 2024) was an American professional football wide receiver who played for five seasons in the National Football League (NFL) for the San Francisco 49ers. He played college football for the Fresno State Bulldogs and was selected by the 49ers in the fourth round of the 1961 NFL draft. Messer died on February 27, 2024, at the age of 86.
