= Ben Mahdavi =

American football player (born 1980)

Profile
- Position: Linebacker/Long snapper

Personal information
- Born: February 27, 1980 (age 46); Mercer Island, Washington
- Listed height: 6 ft 2 in (1.88 m)
- Listed weight: 235 lb (107 kg)

Career information
- High school: Mercer Island (WA)
- College: Washington
- NFL draft: 2003: undrafted

Career history
- Atlanta Falcons (2003)*; Indianapolis Colts (2003)*; Amsterdam Admirals (2004)*
- * Offseason or practice squad member only

Awards and highlights
- Huskies’ Defensive Team MVP (2002); Guy Flaherty Award (2002); Huskies’ Defensive Team MVP (2001); Chuck Niemi Big Hit Award (2001)

Ben Mahdavi is a former American football linebacker and long snapper. Over his two year career, he played for the Atlanta Falcons, Indianapolis Colts, and Amsterdam Admirals of the National Football League (NFL). He played college football for the Washington Huskies.

== Early life ==
Mahdavi attended Mercer Island High School in Mercer Island, Washington, where he played linebacker, running back, and long snapper on the football team. He earned All-League and All-State honors in football. He was also a state wrestling championship and helped lead the wrestling team to a league title. Mahdavi was later inducted into the Mercer Island High School Football and Wrestling Hall of Fame.

== College career ==
Mahdavi began his college football career at the University of Utah before transferring to the University of Washington as a walk-on in 1998. After redshirting due to NCAA transfer rules, he contributed in 1999 as a long snapper and special teams player, scoring a touchdown on a fumble recovery in the season opener.

He was awarded a full athletic scholarship at the start of the 2000 season and earned the starting linebacker role, finishing the year with 52 tackles, five tackles for loss, and two sacks. In 2001, Mahdavi led the team with 90 tackles, added five sacks, tied a school record with four fumble recoveries, earned Pac-10 Defensive Player of the Week honors for a 15-tackle performance against USC, and was named Washington’s Defensive MVP.

Ahead of the 2002 season, he was ranked No. 72 in ESPN Magazine’s Top 100 Players in College Football. He served as team captain, tied for the team lead with 100 tackles, and was named Washington’s Defensive MVP for the second consecutive year. He finished his career with 247 tackles, 26.5 tackles for loss, and nine sacks, and was honored with the Guy Flaherty Award and a selection to the East–West Shrine Game.

Awards and honors

- Huskies’ Defensive Team MVP (2002)
- Guy Flaherty Most Inspirational Award (2002)
- Huskies’ Defensive Team MVP (2001)
- First-team Football News All-Conference selection (2001)
- Ranked among the nation’s Top 100 by ESPNMag.com (2001)
- Pac-10 Defensive Player of the Week (2001)
- Five consecutive Coaches’ Defensive MVP awards (2001)
- First-team All-American selection by Jewish Sports Review (2001)
- Honorable mention All-Pac-10 (2001)
- Huskies’ Special Teams MVP (2000)
- Huskies’ Defensive MVP (2000)

== Education ==
Mahdavi received his BA in Communications and an MBA from University of Washington Michael G. Foster School of Business.

== Professional career ==
Mahdavi was not selected in the 2003 NFL draft. However, he later signed with the Atlanta Falcons. On July 31, 2003, he suffered a broken foot, which required surgery. He was placed on injured reserve, but was subsequently released on August 6, 2003, after receiving an injury settlement. Shortly after, he was signed by the Indianapolis Colts, who ultimately sent him to NFL Europe for the 2004 season. Mahdavi has since received an MBA from Washington. He previously was a partner at Quiet Capital and later founded Trace Capital.
