= Samuel B. Fewell Jr. =

American politician, lawyer, and football player

Member of the South Carolina House of Representatives for York County
- In office 1967–1976

Personal details
- Born: July 8, 1939 (age 87) Rock Hill, South Carolina, U.S.
- Party: Democratic
- Occupation: lawyer

Samuel Bruce Fewell Jr. (born July 8, 1939) was an American politician in the state of South Carolina and professional football player. He served in the South Carolina House of Representatives as a member of the Democratic Party from 1967 to 1976, representing York County, South Carolina. He played in the National Football League (NFL) from 1961 to 1963 and in the Canadian Football League (CFL) in 1964. He is a lawyer.

== Football career ==
Sam Fewell
No. 57
- Position: Offensive tackle

Personal information
- Born: July 8, 1939 (age 87); Rock Hill, South Carolina, U.S.
- Listed height: 6 ft 2 in (1.88 m)
- Listed weight: 250 lb (113 kg)

Career information
- College: South Carolina
- NFL draft: 1961: 11th round, 145th overall pick

Career history
- Chicago Bears (1961–1963); Montreal Alouettes (1964)

Awards and highlights
- Second-team All-ACC (1960)
