= Dick Longshore =

American politician

Member of the California State Assembly from the 72nd district
- In office December 1, 1986 - June 8, 1988
- Preceded by: Richard H. Robinson
- Succeeded by: Curt Pringle

Personal details
- Born: March 21, 1926 Arkansas City, Kansas, US
- Died: June 8, 1988 (aged 62) Sacramento, California, US
- Party: Republican
- Spouse: Linda
- Children: 4

Military service
- Branch/service: United States Navy
- Battles/wars: World War II; Korean War; Vietnam War

Richard "Dick" E. Longshore (March 21, 1926, in Arkansas City, Kansas – June 8, 1988, in Sacramento, California) was an American politician from California and a member of the Republican Party.

He first ran for the California State Assembly in 1982 against Democratic incumbent Richard H. Robinson, who had held the Orange County-based 72nd district since 1974. Although Longshore managed just 43.8% of the vote, he didn't give up. He ran against Robinson again in 1984 and this time, with Ronald Reagan at the top of the ticket, scored 49.8% of the vote.

From 1984 to 1986 he served as a member of the State Veterans' Board.

By the time Longshore ran again in 1986, Robinson had decided to make what would turn out to be an unsuccessful run for Congress against then Rep. Bob Dornan (R-Santa Ana).

In the race for Robinson's now open assembly seat Longshore defeated the Democratic candidate, then Santa Ana mayor Daniel E. Griset by just over 10 points.

In 1988, one day after winning the Republican primary for reelection, Longshore died from complications of pneumonia. This allowed the Orange County Republican Central Committee to name a replacement candidate, and they chose 29-year old Curt Pringle, an elected member of the committee. Pringle went on to narrowly win the seat against Democrat Christian Thierbach, a deputy district attorney from Riverside county.

== Electoral history ==
Member, California State Assembly: 1986-1988
Year	Office	Democrat	Votes	Pct	Republican	Votes	Pct
1982	California State Assembly; District 72	Richard Robinson	35,415	56.2%	Dick Longshore	27,621	43.8%
1984	California State Assembly; District 72	Richard Robinson	37,112	50.2%	Dick Longshore	36,856	49.8%
1986	California State Assembly; District 72	Daniel E. Griset	23,769	44.5%	Dick Longshore	29,654	55.5%

Political offices
Preceded by Richard H. Robinson	California State Assembly, 72nd District; December 1, 1986 - June 8, 1988	Succeeded by Curt Pringle
