= Jordan High School (Long Beach, California) =

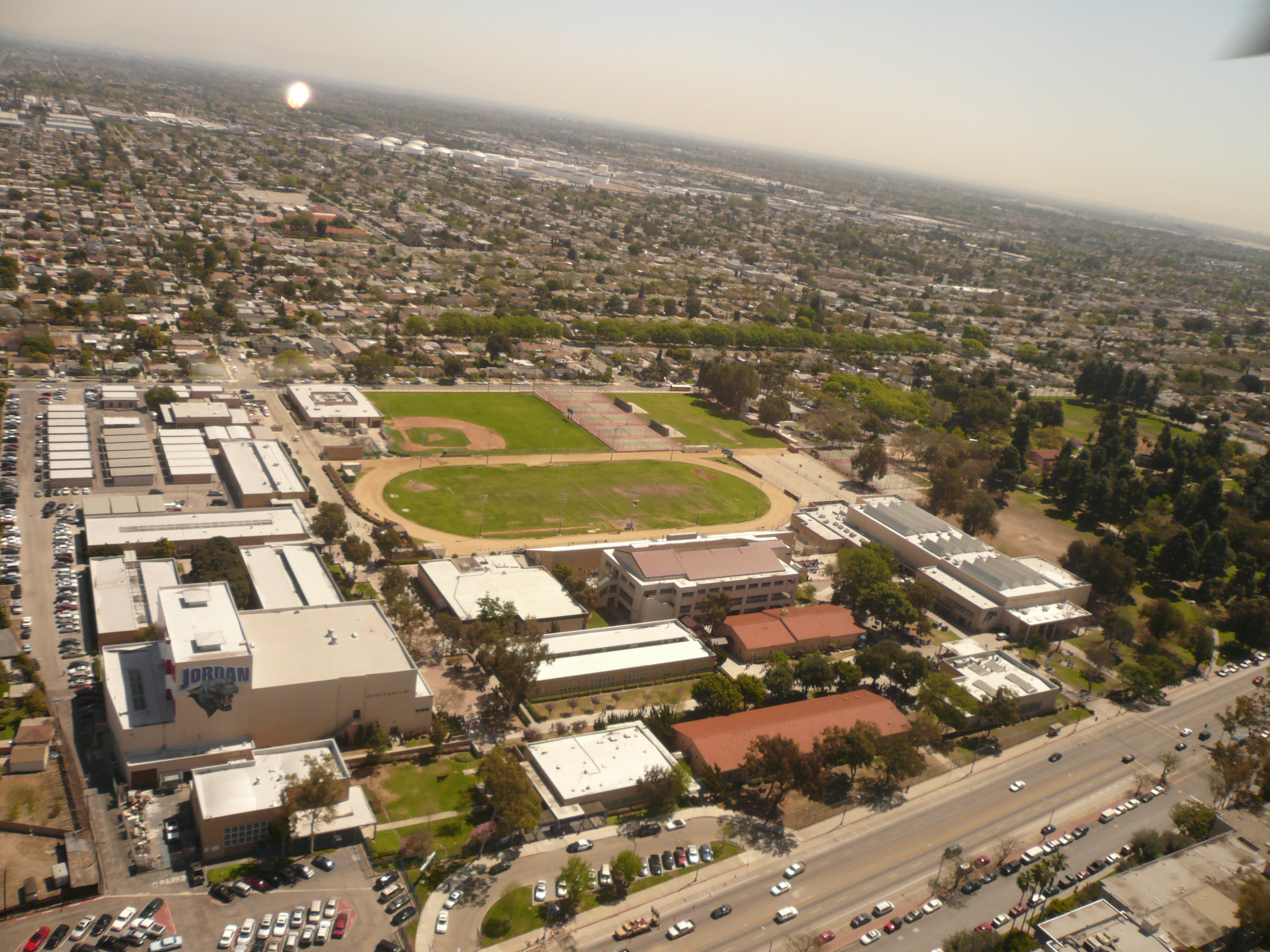

Location
- 6500 Atlantic Avenue; Long Beach, California 90805; United States; 33.872505°N 118.185955°W

Information
- School type: Public
- Established: 1934; 92 years ago
- School district: Long Beach Unified School District
- CEEB code: 051465
- Principal: Keisha Irving
- Teaching staff: 105.85 (FTE)
- Grades: 9–12
- Enrollment: 2,207 (2023–2024)
- Student to teacher ratio: 20.85
- Campus type: Urban
- Color
- Athletics conference: Moore League
- Team name: Panthers
- Accreditation: WASC
- Publication: Stylus Magazine
- Yearbook: Trailblazer
- Website: jordan.lbschools.net

Jordan High School is a public high school in Long Beach, California. It is part of the Long Beach Unified School District.

The school is named in honor of David Starr Jordan, the founding president of Stanford University, a noted educator and a leader in field of eugenics who had died just two years before the school first opened in 1934. A century later, there have been many calls for the school to break its association with Dr. Jordan by having the school be renamed.

== Overview ==
Jordan High School comprises two campuses. The main campus serves students from grades 10-12 and select 9th graders in special programs. The second campus, known as the Jordan Freshman Academy, was constructed in 2001 and serves the incoming 9th grade students. Referred to as "The Freshman Academy" or "Baby Jordan" by students, it is located at the site of the former Dominguez Mercy Hospital at 171 W. Bort Street, Long Beach, California. Jordan Freshmen Academy then had its final year for the group of 2011–2012. Starting from late 2012, Jordan Freshmen Academy became known as, "J Plus[+] or Jordan Plus[+]". Jordan Plus became the campus available to failing students, or students with a low GPA.

Ethnic composition as of 2020–21
Race and ethnicity	Total
Hispanic or Latino	76.2%
African American	13.7%
Asian	5.3%
Pacific Islander	2.1%
Non-Hispanic White/Anglo	1.4%
Other	1.1%
Native American	0.2%

== Major Renovation ==
Jordan High School had a major renovation from late 2014 to late 2018. It took three and a half years to remodel the school.

== Athletics ==
Jordan belongs in CIF-SS Div I.

== Notable alumni ==
- Dennis Brown - former NFL player for the San Francisco 49ers; part of the winning Super Bowl XXIX team
- Travon Bryant - basketball coach and former Euroleague player
- Bob Denver - actor known for playing Gilligan on Gilligan's Island
- Ron Fairly - sports broadcaster and former MLB player
- Jeff Hanneman - guitarist and co-founder of SLAYER
- Leon Hooten - former MLB player
- Gail Hopkins - former MLB player and coach
- Bob Humphreys - former track and field athlete and football player
- Andrew Lane - record producer and songwriter
- Manny Montana - actor known for playing Rio in Good Girls
- Johnny Nansen - college football coach and former professional player
- John Ross III - NFL and UFL player
- Richard A. Smith - singer, songwriter, guitarist, and founder of Long Beach Dub Allstars
- Vince Staples - rapper and songwriter
- John Timu - football coach and former linebacker
- Marcus Turner - former NFL player
- James Q. Wilson - political scientist and professor at UCLA and Harvard University
- Kathy Young - singer known for "A Thousand Stars"
