= 1960 All-Atlantic Coast Conference football team =

American college football all-star team

The 1960 All-Atlantic Coast Conference football team consists of American football players chosen by various selectors for their All-Atlantic Coast Conference ("ACC") teams for the 1960 college football season. Selectors in 1960 included the Associated Press (AP) and the United Press International (UPI).

== All-Atlantic Coast selections ==
=== Ends ===
- Claude "Tee" Moorman, Duke (AP-1; UPI-1)
- Gary Collins, Maryland (AP-1; UPI-1)
- Gary Barnes, Clemson (UPI-1; AP-2)
- Jim Tapp, North Carolina State (AP-2)
- Bobby Allen, Wake Forest (UPI-2)

=== Tackles ===
- Dwight Bumgarner, Duke (AP-1; UPI-1)
- Collice Moore, North Carolina State (AP-1; UPI-2)
- Ronnie Osborne, Clemson (UPI-1)
- Samuel B. Fewell Jr., South Carolina (UPI-2)
- Ron Gassert, Virginia (AP-2)
- Wayne Wolff, Wake Forest (AP-2)

=== Guards ===
- Jake Bodkin, South Carolina (AP-1; UPI-1)
- Art Browning, Duke (AP-1; UPI-2)
- Alex Gilleskie, North Carolina State (UPI-1; AP-2)
- Dave Lynn, Clemson (AP-2; UPI-2)

=== Centers ===
- Rip Hawkins, North Carolina (AP-1; UPI-1)
- Jim Fitzgerald, North Carolina State (AP-2)
- Deems (Butch) Allie, Duke (UPI-2)

=== Backs ===
- Roman Gabriel, North Carolina State (AP-1; UPI-1 [quarterback])
- Norm Snead, Wake Forest (AP-1; UPI-1 [quarterback])
- Mark Leggett, Duke (AP-1; UPI-2)
- Lowndes Shingler, Clemson (AP-1; UPI-2)
- Claude "Hoot" Gibson, North Carolina State (UPI-1 [halfback])
- Fred Shepherd, Virginia (UPI-1 [fullback])
- Joel Arrington, Duke (AP-2; UPI-2)
- Bill McGuirt, Clemson (AP-2; UPI-2)
- Dean Wright, Duke (AP-2)
- Dale Betty, Maryland (AP-2)

== Key ==
Bold = consensus first-team All-ACC players selected to the first team by both the AP and UPI

AP = Associated Press

UPI = United Press International

== See also ==
- 1960 College Football All-America Team
