= Mike Zandofsky =

American football player (born 1965)

No. 62, 70, 72, 66
- Position: Guard

Personal information
- Born: November 30, 1965 (age 60); Corvallis, Oregon, U.S.
- Listed height: 6 ft 2 in (1.88 m)
- Listed weight: 300 lb (136 kg)

Career information
- High school: Corvallis
- College: Washington
- NFL draft: 1989: 3rd round, 67th overall pick

Career history
- Phoenix Cardinals (1989); San Diego Chargers (1990–1993); Atlanta Falcons (1994–1996); Philadelphia Eagles (1997); Chicago Bears (1998)*
- * Offseason or practice squad member only

Awards and highlights
- 3× First-team All-Pac-10 (1986, 1987, 1988)

Career NFL statistics
- Games played: 116
- Games started: 71
- Fumble recoveries: 1
- Stats at Pro Football Reference

Michael Leslie Zandofsky (born November 30, 1965) is an American former professional football player who was an offensive lineman in the National Football League (NFL).

== Early life ==
Zandofsky attended Corvallis High School in Corvallis, Oregon and starred in football, wrestling, and baseball. He helped lead the Corvallis Spartans to a 3A Oregon State Championship in 1983. Zandofsky was first-team all-state as a defensive tackle as a junior and senior, as well as a first-team all-state offensive lineman as a senior. He was also the 3A Oregon State wrestling champion in the heavyweight class in 1983.

== College career ==
Zandofsky was a highly touted recruit as on offensive lineman out of high school. Ultimately, he chose to play football at the University of Washington. Zandofsky was a stand-out offensive lineman for the Huskies, playing both guard and tackle in his time there. Mike started a total of 41 games in his college career. Zandofsky was a three time All-American, earning a first team selection after his senior season. Zandofsky was also a first-team All Pac-10 selection as a sophomore, junior, and as a senior. In his senior year, he was a pre-season Playboy All-American. He was selected to play in the Blue–Gray Football Classic game as a junior and to the East–West Shrine Bowl game as a senior. In addition, he was awarded the John P. Angel award, an award given out by the Huskies to the top offensive lineman on the team, in his junior and senior season. Zandofsky was a team captain as a senior as well.

== Professional career ==
=== Arizona Cardinals ===
Zandofsky was selected in the 1989 NFL draft in the third round (67th overall) by the Arizona Cardinals. In his rookie season, Zandofsky played in 15 games, starting 6 of them for the Cardinals.

=== San Diego Chargers ===
In the off-season of 1990, Zandofsky was traded to the San Diego Chargers. While in San Diego, Zandofsky was primarily used as a back-up guard for this first three seasons there. In 1993, Mike's fourth season with the Chargers, his hard work earned him a starting spot at left guard. Zandofksy started all 16 games for the Chargers that season.

=== Atlanta Falcons ===
Zandofsky signed a free agent deal with the Atlanta Falcons in 1994. While in Atlanta, Zandofsky was a huge part of the team's offensive line. In his three seasons with the Falcons, Mike played in 42 games, starting all 42 of those games at the right guard position. The Falcons were in a rebuilding phase following their 3-13 1996 season, and chose to not re-sign Zandofsky.

=== Philadelphia Eagles ===
The Philadelphia Eagles signed Zandofsky to a free agent deal in April 1997. Zandofsky played in 5 games, starting 2 for the Eagles before being released in November. In March 1998, Zandofsky was signed by the Chicago Bears to help the team with their right guard needs. Zandofsky was released by the Bears as one of the final roster cuts in August 1998.

== Coaching career ==
Zandofsky was brought on as an assistant coach at Corvallis High School when former high school teammate Chris McGowan was hired as the Spartans head football coach in 2002. While coaching at his alma mater, Zandofsky was the offensive and defensive line coach. His offensive line at Corvallis has helped produce the schools top three season totals by a running back in school history in 2004, 2006, and 2009. In 2006, Corvallis High won the 5A State Championship, the school's first since Zandofsky's senior year back in 1983.
