= Richard H. Robinson (California politician) =

American politician

Member of the California State Assembly from the 72nd district
- In office December 2, 1974 - November 30, 1986
- Preceded by: John Quimby
- Succeeded by: Dick Longshore

Personal details
- Born: May 17, 1943 (age 83) Birmingham, Alabama, US
- Party: Democratic
- Spouse: Becky
- Children: 3

Military service
- Branch/service: United States Marine Corps
- Battles/wars: Vietnam War

Richard H. Robinson (born May 17, 1943 in Birmingham, Alabama) is an American politician from California and a member of the Democratic Party.

A veteran of the Marine Corps during the Vietnam War era, Robinson was director of Operation Drug Prevention of Orange County when he ran for California State Assembly in 1974. He defeated 6-term incumbent John Quimby in the Democratic primary and then went on to easily beat his Republican opponent, University of Southern California football and NFL veteran Marlin McKeever.

He easily won reelection in 1976, 1978 and 1980 and would go on to serve as Majority Caucus Chair from 1982-84.

Running in a redrawn district in 1982, Robinson won reelection with 56.2% of the vote over Republican Dick Longshore who managed 43.8%. Longshore ran against Robinson again in 1984 and this time, with Ronald Reagan at the top of the ticket, scored 49.8% of the vote.

This prompted Robinson to abandon reelection in 1986 and instead run for congress against Rep. Bob Dornan (R-Santa Ana), who had ousted Democratic incumbent Jerry M. Patterson two years earlier. Dornan beat Robinson by almost 13 points after a bruising, million dollar campaign.

Meanwhile, Longshore won Robinson's now open assembly seat, defeating Democratic Santa Ana mayor Daniel E. Griset by more than 10 points.

== Electoral history ==
Member, California State Assembly: 1986-1988
Year	Office	Democrat	Votes	Pct	Republican	Votes	Pct
1974	California State Assembly; District 72	Richard Robinson	36,830	56.7%	Marlin McKeever	23,084	35.5%
1976	California State Assembly; District 72	Richard Robinson	47,549	57.8%	Peter J. Vogel	29,380	35.7%
1978	California State Assembly; District 72	Richard Robinson	38,841	62.2%	David L. Brandt	23,620	37.8%
1980	California State Assembly; District 72	Richard Robinson	50,348	65.5%	Raoul Silva	25,486	34.5%
1982	California State Assembly; District 72	Richard Robinson	35,415	56.2%	Dick Longshore	27,621	43.8%
1984	California State Assembly; District 72	Richard Robinson	37,112	50.2%	Dick Longshore	36,856	49.8%
1986	United States House of Representatives District 38	Richard Robinson	50,625	42.4%	Bob Dornan	66,032	55.3%

Political offices
Preceded by John Quimby	California State Assembly, 72nd District; December 2, 1974 - November 30, 1986	Succeeded by Dick Longshore
