= Ray Ratkowski =

American football player (born 1939)

No. 23
- Position: Halfback

Personal information
- Born: November 10, 1939 (age 86); New York, New York, U.S.
- Listed height: 6 ft 0 in (1.83 m)
- Listed weight: 195 lb (88 kg)

Career information
- High school: St. Francis (Queens, New York)
- College: Notre Dame (1957–1960)
- NFL draft: 1961: 20th round, 278th overall pick
- AFL draft: 1961: 17th round, 130th overall pick

Career history
- Boston Patriots (1961)

Career AFL statistics
- Return yards: 17
- Stats at Pro Football Reference

Raymond James Ratkowski (born November 10, 1939) was an American professional football halfback. He played football at the University of Notre Dame. He was selected in the 20th round of the 1961 NFL draft and played for the Boston Patriots of the American Football League (AFL) during the 1961 AFL season.

Ratkowski later served in the Marine Corps and worked for the FBI. Upon retirement to Cape Cod he developed an interest in expressionist painting. He died on April 30, 2012. Ray was an all-city running back at St. Francis Prep in Brooklyn.
