= Mike McKeever =

American football player (1940–1967)

Profile
- Position: Guard

Personal information
- Born: January 1, 1940; Cheyenne, Wyoming, U.S.
- Died: August 24, 1967 (aged 27); Montebello, California, U.S.

Career information
- College: USC

Awards and highlights
- First-team All-American (1959); First-team All-PCC (1959)

Mike McKeever (January 1, 1940 – August 24, 1967) was an American college football guard at the University of Southern California.

== College career ==
McKeever earned All-American honors. He was also chosen to the Academic All-American team. He and his brother Marlin McKeever were the first twins to earn All-America status. McKeever suffered a head injury in his senior year at USC which ended his collegiate football career. He was named to the College Football Hall of Fame in 1987.

== Film career ==
With his twin brother, McKeever also had a brief career in film, appearing in the 1962 Three Stooges comedy film The Three Stooges Meet Hercules playing the Siamese Cyclops twins Ajax and Argo.

== Professional career ==
McKeever was selected in the 13th round (pick 172 overall) by the Los Angeles Rams, in the 1961 NFL draft. He was also selected by the San Diego Chargers in the 30th round with the 240th overall pick of the 1961 AFL draft.

== Death ==
After graduation, McKeever became general superintendent of a construction company and involved himself heavily in community activities, including Big Brothers, United Way and the City of Hope Hospital.

While returning from work in December 1965, McKeever was involved in a traffic collision in the city of Fountain Valley, south of Los Angeles. He suffered extensive head injuries and was in a coma for 21 months before dying at age 27. At the time of the accident, McKeever was training for the hammer throw, hoping to make the U.S. Olympic Team. His interment was in Culver City's Holy Cross Cemetery.

== Personal ==
McKeever was survived by his wife, Judy; a daughter, Teri; and two sons, Mike Jr. (aka "Mac") and John (aka "Barry") who continued the McKeever sports legacy in both swimming and football.

Daughter Teri McKeever attended USC and competed for the USC swim team. She went on to become the head coach of the University of California and in 2004 became the first female coach of the U.S. Olympic swimming team. McKeever's sons became football players and in 1984 were named winners of scholar-athlete awards of the San Diego chapter of the National Football Foundation. Son Barry McKeever played football (linebacker) for Stanford University and gained national recognition in 1987 for his public refusal (including an interview on national television) to have his urine tested for drugs on the basis that this act was a violation of his constitutional rights.
