= Doyle Schick =

American football player and coach (1939–2001)

No. 21
- Position: Cornerback

Personal information
- Born: February 23, 1939; Lawrence, Kansas, U.S.
- Died: February 27, 2001 (aged 62); Shawnee Mission, Kansas, U.S.
- Listed height: 6 ft 1 in (1.85 m)
- Listed weight: 205 lb (93 kg)

Career information
- High school: Lawrence
- College: Kansas
- NFL draft: 1961: 14th round, 185th overall pick

Career history
- Washington Redskins (1961)

Career NFL statistics
- Games played: 5
- Stats at Pro Football Reference

Doyle Dean Schick (February 23, 1939 – February 27, 2001) was an American professional football cornerback in the National Football League (NFL) for the Washington Redskins. He played college football at the University of Kansas and was drafted in the fourteenth round of the 1961 NFL draft. After his NFL career was over he was the head coach of several high school football teams in Kansas.
