= Wayne Wolff =

American football player (born 1938)

No. 60
- Position: Guard

Personal information
- Born: January 28, 1938 (age 88); Greensburg, Pennsylvania, U.S.
- Listed height: 6 ft 2 in (1.88 m)
- Listed weight: 243 lb (110 kg)

Career information
- High school: Greensburg-Salem
- College: Wake Forest
- NFL draft: 1961: 10th round, 129th overall pick
- AFL draft: 1961: 17th round, 132nd overall pick

Career history
- Buffalo Bills (1961)

Awards and highlights
- Second-team All-ACC (1960)

Career AFL statistics
- Games played: 2
- Stats at Pro Football Reference

Wayne William Wolff (born January 28, 1938) is an American former professional football player who was a guard for the Buffalo Bills of the American Football League (AFL). He played college football for the Wake Forest Demon Deacons and played with the Bills in 1961. He was drafted by the Bills in the 17th round of the 1961 AFL Draft with the 132nd overall pick.
