= Don McKeta =

American gridiron football player and coach (born 1934)

Profile
- Position: Halfback

Personal information
- Born: November 11, 1934 (age 91)
- Listed height: 5 ft 11 in (1.80 m)
- Listed weight: 185 lb (84 kg)

Career information
- College: Washington
- NFL draft: 1961: 20th round, 277th overall pick

Career history
- 1961: Saskatchewan Roughriders

Awards and highlights
- First-team All-PCC (1960)

Donald J. McKeta (born November 11, 1934) is an American former gridiron football player and coach. He played professionally in the Canadian Football League (CFL) for the Saskatchewan Roughriders. McKeta played college football at the University of Washington, lettering from 1958 to 1960. McKeta was an All-AAWU halfback selection in 1958 and 1959, All-Coast in 1960, and the Seattle P-I Sports Star of the Year.

McKeta was selected 277th overall in the 20th round of the 1961 NFL draft by the New York Giants, though he played the 1961 season with Roughriders. He was an assistant coach at his alma mater, Washington, from 1964 to 1965 under head coach Jim Owens. McKeta served as the head football coach at Wenatchee Valley College in Wenatchee, Washington from 1975 to 1976, compiling a record of 6–12.

== Head coaching record ==
Year	Team	Overall	Conference	Standing	Bowl/playoffs
Wenatchee Valley Knights (Northwest Community College Conference) (1975–1976)
1975	Wenatchee Valley	3–6	3–5	T–3rd (Eastern)	
1976	Wenatchee Valley	3–6	3–6	4th (Eastern)	
Wenatchee Valley:		6–12	6–11		
Total:		6–12			
