= Tony Romeo (American football) =

American football player (1938–1996)

No. 80, 86
- Position: Tight end

Personal information
- Born: March 7, 1938; St. Petersburg, Florida, U.S.
- Died: May 2, 1996 (aged 58); Matthews, North Carolina, U.S.
- Listed height: 6 ft 3 in (1.91 m)
- Listed weight: 230 lb (104 kg)

Career information
- High school: Hillsborough (Tampa, Florida)
- College: Florida State (1957–1960)
- NFL draft: 1961: 19th round, 255th overall pick

Career history
- Dallas Texans (1961); Boston Patriots (1962–1967)

Career AFL statistics
- Receptions: 117
- Receiving yards: 1,813
- Touchdowns: 10
- Stats at Pro Football Reference

Anthony Lamar Romeo (March 7, 1938 – May 2, 1996) was an American professional football tight end in the American Football League (AFL) for the Dallas Texans and Boston Patriots. Mr. Romeo played high school football for Hillsborough High School, Tampa, Florida. He was inducted into his high school's football hall of fame in 2001. He played college football at Florida State University and was drafted in the 19th round of the 1961 NFL draft by the Washington Redskins. Mr. Romeo was a part of the growing evangelical movement among professional football players. During the off season and after his retirement he traveled widely speaking in Southern Baptist and other evangelical churches. Romeo was also known for beginning the first chapel services in professional football. Following his pro career, he spent time in the ministry before putting his FSU business degree to work.

He had a wife, with whom he had two daughters. He died on May 2, 1996, of melanoma.
