= Roy McKasson =

American gridiron football player (1939–1998)

Profile
- Position: Center

Personal information
- Born: August 23, 1939; Kellogg, Idaho, U.S.
- Died: January 23, 1998 (aged 58)

Career information
- High school: Clover Park
- College: Washington

Career history
- 1961: Edmonton Eskimos

Awards and highlights
- First-team All-American (1960); First-team All-PCC (1960); Second-team All-PCC (1959)

Roy William McKasson (August 23, 1939 – January 23, 1998) was an American football player.

McKasson played for the Washington Huskies football team from 1959 to 1961. He also played one year of professional football for the Edmonton Eskimos of the Canadian Football League (CFL). He was selected by the Associated Press (AP) as the second-team center on the 1959 All-Pacific Coast football team and as the first-team center on the 1960 All-Pacific Coast football team. He was also selected by the AP, Newspaper Enterprise Association, and Football Writers Association of America as the first-team center on the 1960 College Football All-America Team.

McKasson was inducted into the Washington Huskies Hall of Fame in 1987. He died in 1998 as the result of complications from a kidney transplant.
