= Bill Hill (Canadian football) =

Canadian football player (1936–2020)

Profile
- Position: Fullback

Personal information
- Born: May 23, 1936; McKeesport, Pennsylvania, U.S.
- Died: June 1, 2020 (aged 84); Clinton, South Carolina, U.S.
- Listed height: 6 ft 0 in (1.83 m)
- Listed weight: 210 lb (95 kg)

Career information
- College: Presbyterian (South Carolina)
- NFL draft: 1961: 19th round, 253rd overall pick

Career history
- 1961–1962: Edmonton Eskimos
- 1962: Montreal Alouettes

William R. Hill (May 23, 1936 – June 1, 2020) was an American-born Canadian football player who played for the Edmonton Eskimos and Montreal Alouettes.
