= Dennis Brown (defensive end) =

American football player (born 1967)

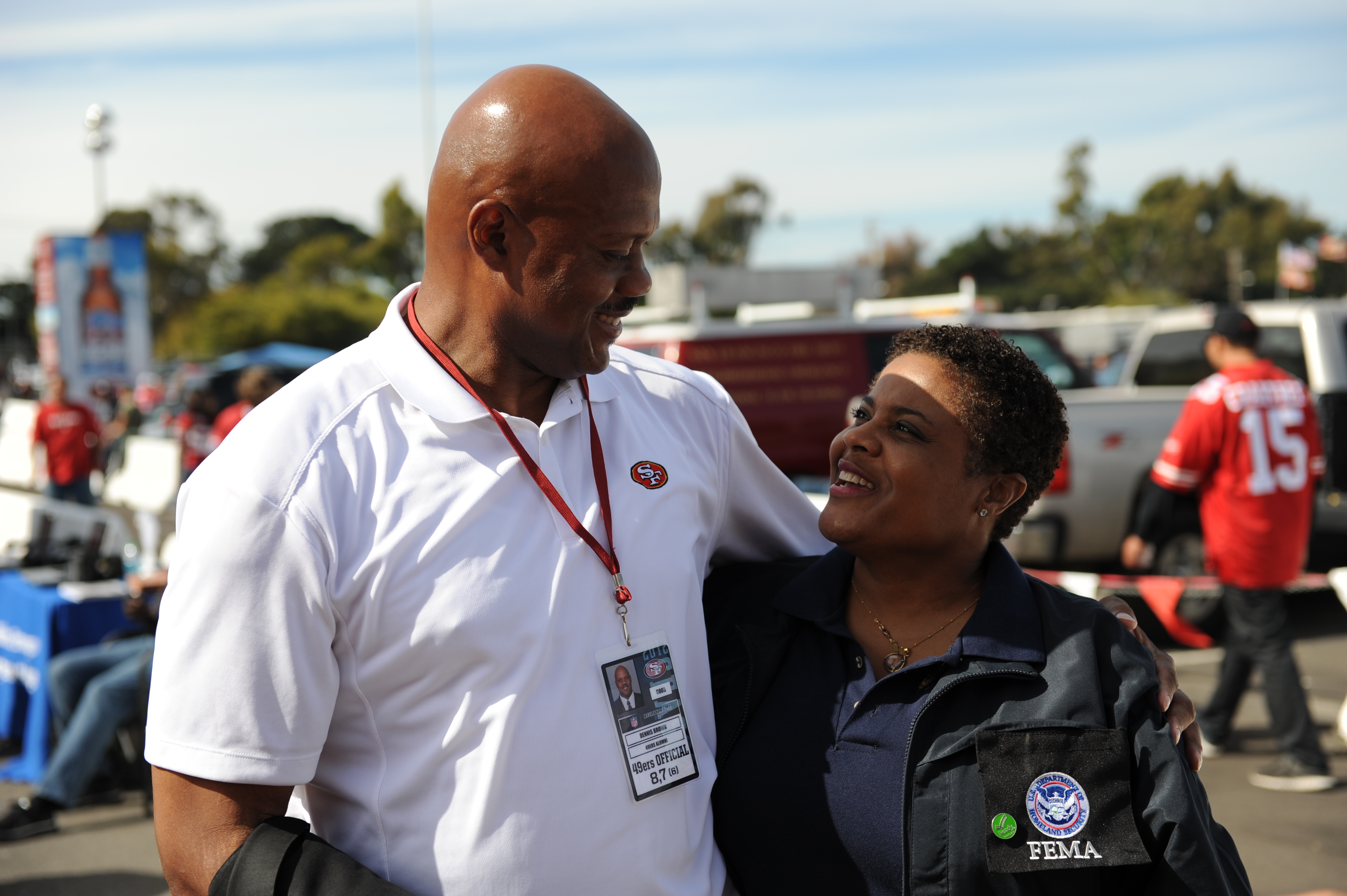
- Brown (left) in 2012

No. 96
- Position: Defensive end

Personal information
- Born: November 6, 1967 (age 58); Los Angeles, California, U.S.
- Listed height: 6 ft 4 in (1.93 m)
- Listed weight: 290 lb (132 kg)

Career information
- High school: Jordan (Long Beach, California)
- College: Washington
- NFL draft: 1990: 2nd round, 47th overall pick

Career history
- San Francisco 49ers (1990–1996)

Awards and highlights
- Super Bowl champion (XXIX); Second-team All-American; First-team All-Pac-10 (1988); Second-team All-Pac-10 (1987)

Career NFL statistics
- Tackles: 214
- Sacks: 24.5
- Interceptions: 2
- Stats at Pro Football Reference

Dennis Trammel Brown (born November 6, 1967) is an American former professional football player who was a defensive end for seven seasons with the San Francisco 49ers of the National Football League (NFL). He played college football for the Washington Huskies.

== Career history ==
Dennis Brown played football at Long Beach Jordan High School and his strong performance earned him offers to attend various top-notch colleges, including UCLA and USC. He attended the University of Washington from 1986 to 1990 where he wore #79 and was drafted by the San Francisco 49ers in the second round of the 1990 NFL draft. That same year he earned the team's Rookie of the Year honors. In 1995, he started in Super Bowl XXIX.

== Post-NFL career ==
After retirement he moved to Seattle, Washington, with his then-wife Danielle, daughter Darienne Kathleen, and his son Derrick Jonathan. In 1998, Danielle and Dennis divorced. Dennis has received the San Francisco 49ers Community Relations Alumni Service Award nine times since his NFL retirement. He also serves as an ambassador for USA Heads Up Football and as an alumni representative for the San Francisco 49ers. He served for four years on the board of the San Mateo (PAL) Police Athletic League, currently sits on the board of the San Francisco police activities league, also serves on the Players Advisory Board of the NFL Alumni Northern California, Today Dennis is a Sports Analyst for Comcast Sports Net, and host of the KNBR 49ers pre/post game shows. He lives in San Francisco with his second wife, Erica.

== Quotes ==
"I think to myself, do you know how many guys play their whole careers and never get the chance to be a champion? Yet, I was lucky enough to experience it.
Sometimes I stop and think, man that was big deal, a Super Bowl! And I had the opportunity to be a part of it!"

"It was so quiet on the bus. Everybody was just thinking about what they had accomplished. I was in a two-year stretch where things weren’t going very well for me-- my marriage was about over, I had some health problems, things like that. But this game was an escape, a chance to get away from everything for a while... So we’re on the bus, and Rickey Jackson’s son fell asleep on me... I was quietly looking out the window at all the buildings going by, and I thought, Wow, I just won a Super Bowl -- and here I've got this kid asleep on my leg"

== See also ==
- Washington Huskies football statistical leaders
