= Kai Ellis =

American gridiron football player (born 1980)

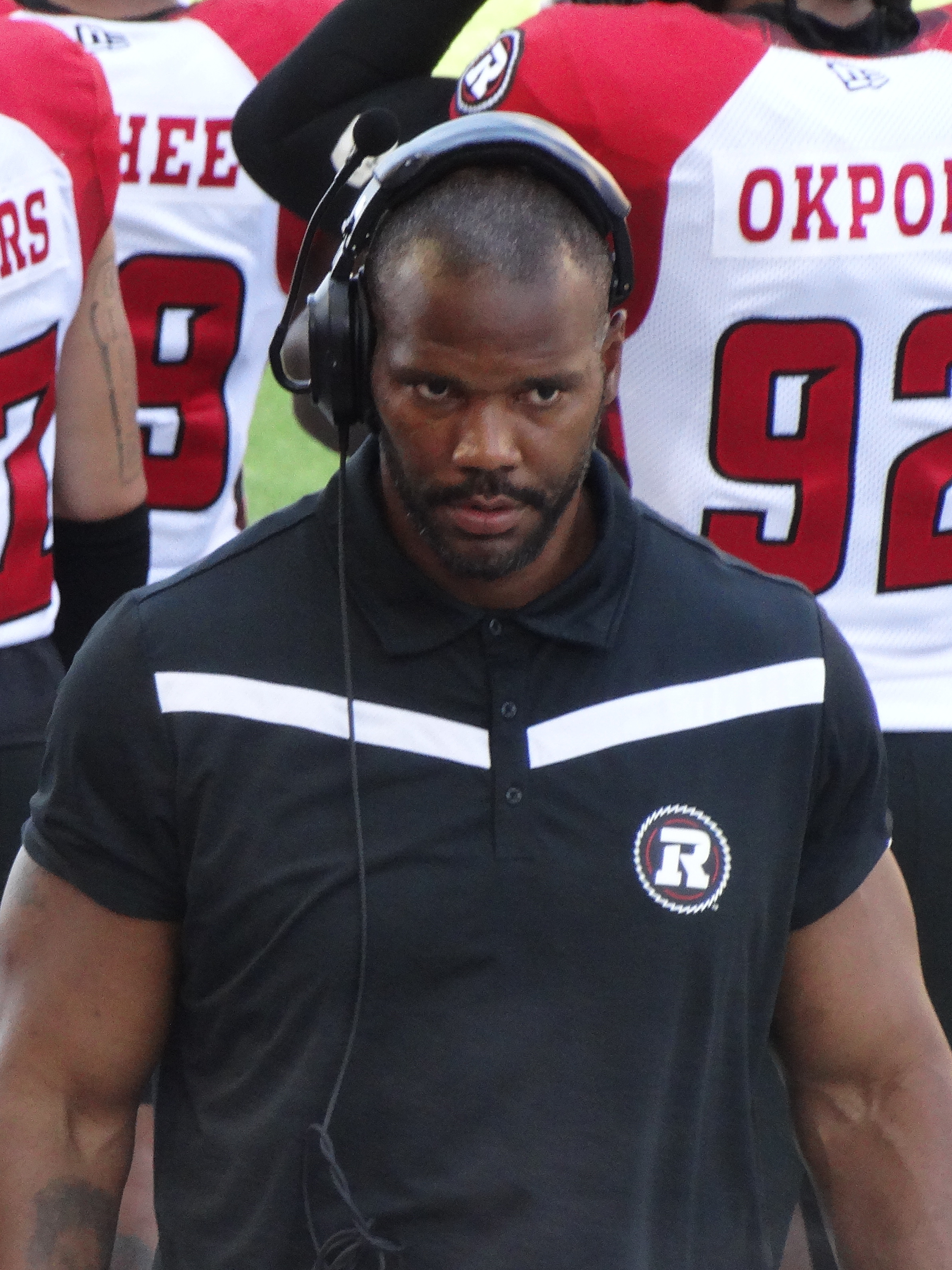
- Ellis with the Ottawa Redblacks in 2025

Personal information
- Born: August 7, 1980 (age 46); Kent, Washington, U.S.
- Listed height: 6 ft 4 in (1.93 m)
- Listed weight: 255 lb (116 kg)

Career information
- Positions: Linebacker, defensive end (No. 99, 93, 90)
- High school: Kentridge (Kent, Washington)
- College: CCSF (2000); Washington (2001–2003)
- NFL draft: 2003: undrafted

Career history

Playing
- San Francisco 49ers (2003)*; Calgary Stampeders (2003); Ottawa Renegades (2004–2005); Montreal Alouettes (2006–2008); Winnipeg Blue Bombers (2008); Edmonton Eskimos (2009–2010); San Jose SaberCats (2011)
- * Offseason or practice squad member only

Coaching
- Washington (2013) Assistant defensive line coach; Culver–Stockton (2014) Defensive line coach; West Hills Coaliga (2015–2016) Defensive coordinator & linebackers coach; Briar Cliff (2017) Assistant head coach & defensive coordinator; Adams State (2018–2021) Defensive line coach; Adams State (2022) Assistant head coach, defensive coordinator, & defensive line coach; Adams State (2023) Assistant head coach, defensive coordinator, & linebackers coach; Ottawa Redblacks (2025) Defensive line coach

Awards and highlights
- Second-team All-Pac-10 (2002)

Kai Ellis (born August 7, 1980) is an American professional football coach. He most recently served as the defensive line coach for the Ottawa Redblacks of the Canadian Football League (CFL). He is a former defensive end who played for eight seasons in the CFL for the Calgary Stampeders, Ottawa Renegades, Montreal Alouettes, and Edmonton Eskimos. He was signed by the San Francisco 49ers as an undrafted free agent in 2003. He played collegiately at Washington.

== Coaching career ==
On January 31, 2025, it was announced that Ellis had joined the coaching staff of the Ottawa Redblacks as the team's defensive line coach. He served in that capacity for one season, but was not retained for 2026 following the hire of Ryan Dinwiddie as head coach.
