= John Quimby =

American politician

Member of the California State Assembly from the 72nd district
- In office January 7, 1963 - November 30, 1974
- Preceded by: Eugene G. Nisbet
- Succeeded by: Richard H. Robinson

Personal details
- Born: February 12, 1935 Prescott, Arizona, US
- Died: December 23, 2012 (aged 77) Carmichael, California, US
- Party: Democratic
- Spouse: Gladys George
- Children: 4

John Quimby (February 12, 1935 – December 23, 2012) was an American politician.

Born in Prescott, Arizona, Quimby served on the San Bernardino, California city council. He served as a Democrat in the California State Assembly for the 72nd district from 1963 to 1974. He also lobbied for San Bernardino, California and Riverside, California.

== Biography ==
At the age of 12, he was diagnosed with polio, after which he used a wheelchair or steel braces.

Quimby was the youngest person to serve on the San Bernardino City Council at the age of 22. He was also the first paraplegic to serve in the California Legislature.

== Death ==
Quimby died at the age of 77 on December 23, 2012, of complications from pneumonia.

Political offices
Preceded by Eugene Nesbit	California State Assembly, 72nd District; 1962-1974	Succeeded by Richard H. Robinson
