= Bob Coolbaugh =

American football player (1939–1985)

No. 43, 85
- Position: Wide receiver

Personal information
- Born: July 5, 1939; Kingston, Pennsylvania, U.S.
- Died: June 23, 1985 (aged 45); Riverside County, California, U.S.
- Listed height: 6 ft 4 in (1.93 m)
- Listed weight: 200 lb (91 kg)

Career information
- High school: Franklin Monroe (PA)
- College: Richmond
- NFL draft: 1961: 12th round, 157th overall pick
- AFL draft: 1961: 15th round, 114th overall pick

Career history

Playing
- Oakland Raiders (1961); Scranton Miners (1965-1966)

Coaching
- Scranton Miners (1965) Assistant coach

Career AFL statistics
- Receptions: 32
- Receiving yards: 435
- Touchdowns: 4
- Stats at Pro Football Reference

Irwin Robert Coolbaugh (July 5, 1939 – June 23, 1985) was an American professional football wide receiver in the American Football League (AFL) for the Oakland Raiders. He played college football at the University of Richmond and was drafted in the fifteenth round of the 1961 AFL draft. Coolbaugh was also drafted in the 12th round of the 1961 NFL draft by the Washington Redskins.
