= 1961 NFL draft =

National Football League draft

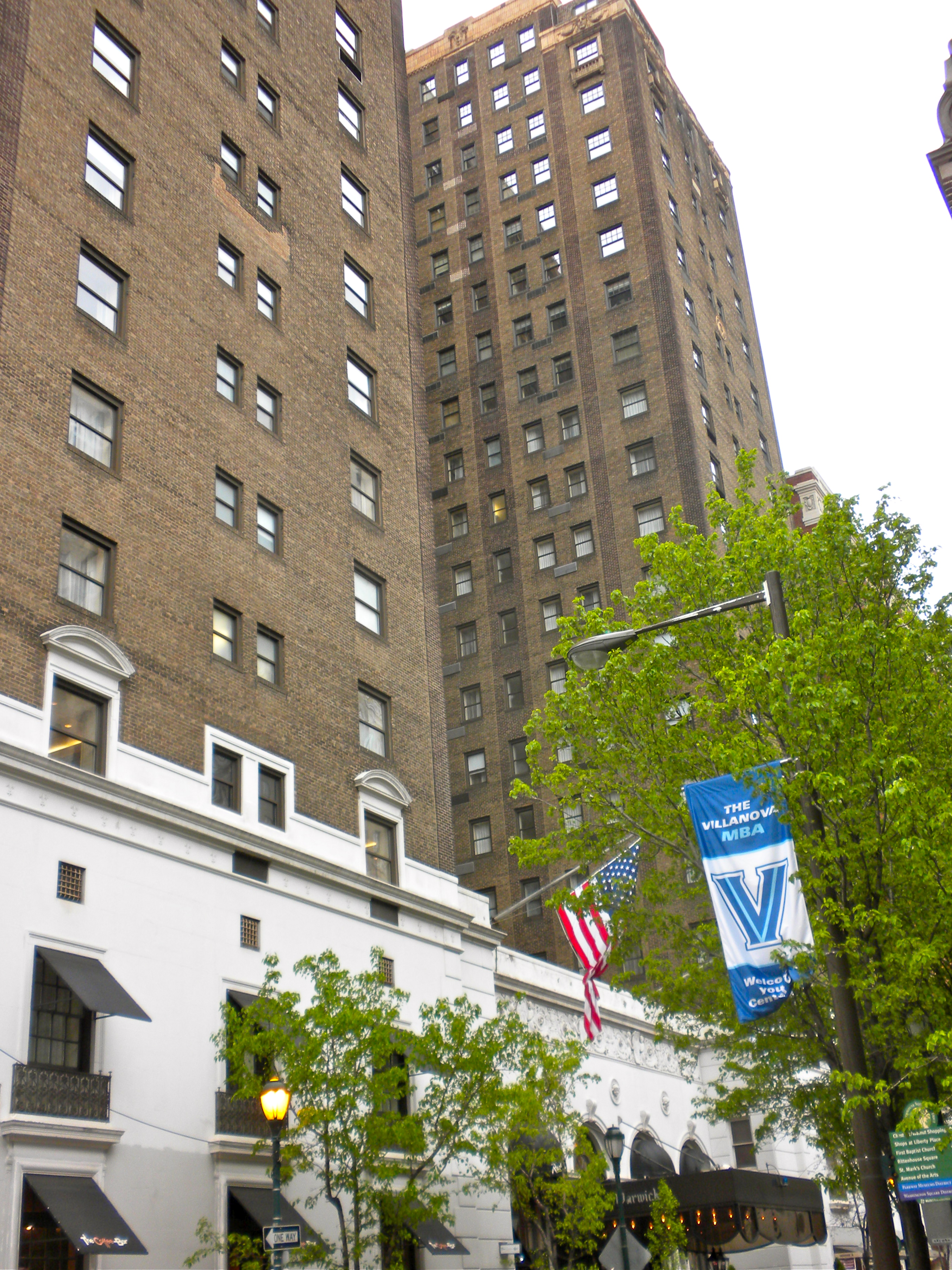
- The Warwick (location of the draft), photographed in 2010

General information
- Date: December 27–28, 1960
- Location: Warwick Hotel in Philadelphia, Pennsylvania

Overview
- 280 total selections in 20 rounds
- League: NFL
- First selection: Tommy Mason, HB; Minnesota Vikings
- Mr. Irrelevant: Jacque MacKinnon, FB; Philadelphia Eagles
- Most selections (26): San Francisco 49ers
- Fewest selections (14): Pittsburgh Steelers
- Hall of Famers: 7: TE Mike Ditka; CB James Earl “Jimmy” Johnson; DT Bob Lilly; CB Herb Adderley; QB Fran Tarkenton; G Billy Shaw; DE David “Deacon” Jones

The 1961 NFL draft took place at the Warwick Hotel in Philadelphia on December 27–28, 1960. The league would later hold an expansion draft for the Minnesota Vikings expansion franchise. This draft was also the first regular draft for the Dallas Cowboys as they had only participated in the 1960 NFL expansion draft that year.

The Cowboys held the worst record in the NFL the previous season, but selected second in this draft because the expansion Vikings were awarded the first overall pick. The Vikings used that pick to select running back Tommy Mason.

== Player selections ==
= Pro Bowler	= AFL All-Star	= Hall of Famer

=== Round 1 ===
Pick #	NFL team	Player	Position	College
1	Minnesota Vikings	Tommy Mason	Halfback	Tulane
2	Washington Redskins ^{(Pick acquired from the Dallas Cowboys)}	Norm Snead	Quarterback	Wake Forest
3	Washington Redskins	Joe Rutgens	Tackle	Illinois
4	Los Angeles Rams	Marlin McKeever	Linebacker	USC
5	Chicago Bears	Mike Ditka	End	Pittsburgh
6	San Francisco 49ers ^{(Pick acquired from the Pittsburgh Steelers)}	James Earl "Jimmy" Johnson	Cornerback, Safety, Wide receiver	UCLA
7	Baltimore Colts	Tom Matte	Running back	Ohio State
8	St. Louis Cardinals	Ken Rice	Tackle	Auburn
9	San Francisco 49ers	Bernie Casey	Back	Bowling Green
10	Cleveland Browns ^{(Pick acquired from the Detroit Lions)}	Bobby Crespino	End	Mississippi
11	San Francisco 49ers ^{(Pick acquired from the Baltimore Colts)}	Billy Kilmer	Quarterback	UCLA
12	Green Bay Packers	Herb Adderley	Back	Michigan State
13	Dallas Cowboys ^{(Pick acquired from the Cleveland Browns)}	Bob Lilly	Tackle	Texas Christian
14	Philadelphia Eagles	Art Baker	fullback	Syracuse

- ^{HOF} Member of the Professional Football Hall of Fame

=== Round 2 ===
Pick #	NFL team	Player	Position	College
15	Minnesota Vikings	Rip Hawkins	Linebacker	North Carolina
16	Dallas Cowboys	E. J. Holub	Center	Texas Tech
17	New York Giants	Bob Gaiters	Back	New Mexico State
18	Los Angeles Rams	Elbert Kimbrough	End	Northwestern
19	Pittsburgh Steelers	Myron Pottios	Linebacker	Notre Dame
20	Chicago Bears	Bill Brown	Back	Illinois
21	Baltimore Colts	Tom Gilburg	Tackle	Syracuse
22	St. Louis Cardinals	Fred Arbanas	End	Michigan State
23	Detroit Lions	Danny LaRose	End	Missouri
24	San Francisco 49ers	Roland Lakes	Center	Wichita State
25	New York Giants	Bruce Tarbox	Guard	Syracuse
26	Green Bay Packers	Ron Kostelnik	Tackle	Cincinnati
27	Cleveland Browns	Ed Nutting	Tackle	Georgia Tech
28	Philadelphia Eagles	Bo Strange	Center	Louisiana State

=== Round 3 ===
Pick #	NFL team	Player	Position	College
29	Minnesota Vikings	Fran Tarkenton	Quarterback	Georgia
30	Dallas Cowboys	Stew Barber	Guard	Penn State
31	St. Louis Cardinals	Billy Wilson	Tackle	Auburn
32	Los Angeles Rams	Harold Beaty	Guard	Oklahoma State
33	Chicago Bears	Claude "Hoot" Gibson	Back	North Carolina State
34	Detroit Lions	Dick Mills	Tackle	Pittsburgh
35	Baltimore Colts	Jerry Hill	Running back	Wyoming
36	Philadelphia Eagles	Jim Wright	Quarterback	Memphis State
37	San Francisco 49ers	Bill Cooper	Back	Muskingum
38	Detroit Lions	Houston Antwine	Guard	Southern Illinois
39	Washington Redskins	Jim Cunningham	Back	Pittsburgh
40	Green Bay Packers	Phil Nugent	Back	Tulane
41	Los Angeles Rams	Ron Miller	Quarterback	Wisconsin
42	Philadelphia Eagles	Don Oakes	Tackle	Virginia Tech

=== Round 4 ===
Pick #	NFL team	Player	Position	College
43	Minnesota Vikings	Chuck Lamson	Running back	Wyoming
44	Dallas Cowboys	Arnold Davis	End	Baylor
45	Los Angeles Rams	Charlie Cowan	Tackle	New Mexico Highlands
46	New York Giants	Ben Davidson	Tackle	Washington
47	San Francisco 49ers	Aaron Thomas	End	Oregon State
48	Chicago Bears	Ernie Ladd	Tackle	Grambling
49	Baltimore Colts	Ken Gregory	End	Whittier
50	St. Louis Cardinals	Ron McDole	Tackle	Nebraska
51	Detroit Lions	Ron Hartline	Running back	Oklahoma
52	San Francisco 49ers	Dale Messer	Back	Fresno State
53	Philadelphia Eagles	Dan Ficca	Guard	USC
54	Green Bay Packers	Paul Dudley	Back	Arkansas
55	Cleveland Browns	John Brown	Tackle	Syracuse
56	Green Bay Packers	Joe LeSage	Guard	Tulane

=== Round 5 ===
Pick #	NFL team	Player	Position	College
57	Minnesota Vikings	Ed Sharockman	Cornerback	Pittsburgh
58	San Francisco 49ers	Clark Miller	Tackle	Utah State
59	Pittsburgh Steelers	Fred Mautino	End	Syracuse
60	Los Angeles Rams	Willie Hector	Guard	Pacific
61	Chicago Bears	Keith Lincoln	Back	Washington State
62	Baltimore Colts	Ed Dyas	Back	Auburn
63	Baltimore Colts	Ron Osborne	Tackle	Clemson
64	St. Louis Cardinals	Glenn Bass	End	East Carolina
65	San Francisco 49ers	Bob McCreary	Tackle	Wake Forest
66	Detroit Lions	Earl Faison	End	Indiana
67	New York Giants	Jerry Daniels	End	Mississippi
68	Green Bay Packers	Jack Novak	Guard	Miami (FL)
69	Cleveland Browns	Mike Lucci	Center	Tennessee
70	Detroit Lions	Ron Puckett	Tackle	Cal State-Los Angeles

=== Round 6 ===
Pick #	NFL team	Player	Position	College
71	Minnesota Vikings	Jerry Burch	End	Georgia Tech
72	Washington Redskins	Joe Krakoski	Back	Illinois
73	Washington Redskins	John O'Day	Tackle	Miami (FL)
74	Los Angeles Rams	Bruce Olderman	Tackle	Allegheny
75	Los Angeles Rams	Larry Wood	Back	Northwestern
76	Chicago Bears	George Fleming	Back	Washington
77	Baltimore Colts	Don Kern	Running back	Virginia Military Inst
78	St. Louis Cardinals	Dale Evans	Back	Kansas State
79	Cleveland Browns	Frank Parker	Tackle	Oklahoma State
80	San Francisco 49ers	Mike McClellan	Back	Oklahoma
81	New York Giants	Greg Larson	Center	Minnesota
82	Green Bay Packers	Lee Folkins	End	Washington
83	St. Louis Cardinals	Dick Thornton	Quarterback	Northwestern
84	Philadelphia Eagles	Ben Balme	Guard	Yale

=== Round 7 ===
Pick #	NFL team	Player	Position	College
85	Minnesota Vikings	Allan Ferrie	End	Wagner
86	Dallas Cowboys	Art Gilmore	Back	Oregon State
87	Washington Redskins	Jim Kerr	Back	Penn State
88	Los Angeles Rams	Bobby Smith	Back	UCLA
89	Chicago Bears	Mike Pyle	Center	Yale
90	Pittsburgh Steelers	Dick Hoak	Back	Penn State
91	Baltimore Colts	Ike Grimsley	Running back	Michigan State
92	St. Louis Cardinals	George Hultz	Tackle	Southern Mississippi
93	San Francisco 49ers	Ray Purdin	Back	Northwestern
94	St. Louis Cardinals	Al Bemiller	Center	Syracuse
95	New York Giants	Jim Collier	End	Arkansas
96	Green Bay Packers	Lewis Johnson	Back	Florida A&M
97	Cleveland Browns	Preston Powell	Back	Grambling
98	Philadelphia Eagles	Irv Cross	Back	Northwestern

=== Round 8 ===
Pick #	NFL team	Player	Position	College
99	Minnesota Vikings	Paul Lindquist	Tackle	New Hampshire
100	Dallas Cowboys	Don Talbert	Tackle	Texas
101	Washington Redskins	Charley Barnes	End	Northwest Louisiana
102	Los Angeles Rams	Reggie Carolan	End	Idaho
103	Pittsburgh Steelers	George Balthazar	Tackle	Tennessee State
104	Chicago Bears	Ed Ryan	Back	Michigan State
105	Baltimore Colts	Paul Terhes	Back	Bucknell
106	St. Louis Cardinals	Marshall Starks	Running back	Illinois
107	Detroit Lions	Larry Muff	End	Benedictine
108	San Francisco 49ers	Neill Plumley	Tackle	Oregon
109	New York Giants	Allen Green	Center	Mississippi
110	Cleveland Browns	Fred Cox	Kicker	Pittsburgh
111	Cleveland Browns	John Frongillo	Tackle	Baylor
112	Philadelphia Eagles	Jim Beaver	Guard	Florida

=== Round 9 ===
Pick #	NFL team	Player	Position	College
113	Minnesota Vikings	Dan Sheehan	Tackle	Tennessee-Chattanooga
114	Dallas Cowboys	Glynn Gregory	Back	Southern Methodist
115	Washington Redskins	Joel Arrington	Back	Duke
116	Los Angeles Rams	Duane Allen	End	Mt. San Antonio J.C.
117	Chicago Bears	Bob Bethune	Back	Mississippi State
118	San Francisco 49ers	Leon Donohue	Tackle	San Jose State
119	Baltimore Colts	Pete Nicklas	Tackle	Baylor
120	St. Louis Cardinals	Chick Granning	Running back	Georgia Tech
121	San Francisco 49ers	Evaristo DeLeon Nino Jr.	Tackle	East Texas State
122	Detroit Lions	Bob Brooks	Running back	Ohio
123	New York Giants	Moses Gray	Tackle	Indiana
124	Green Bay Packers	Vester Flanagan	Tackle	Cal State-Humboldt
125	Cleveland Browns	Jake Gibbs	Quarterback	Mississippi
126	Philadelphia Eagles	Wayne Fontes	Running back	Michigan State

=== Round 10 ===
Pick #	NFL team	Player	Position	College
127	Minnesota Vikings	Doug Mayberry	Running back	Utah State
128	Green Bay Packers	Roger Hagberg	Back	Minnesota
129	Cleveland Browns	Wayne Wolff	Guard	Wake Forest
130	Los Angeles Rams	Joe Scibelli	Tackle	Notre Dame
131	Pittsburgh Steelers	Bill "Red" Mack	Back	Notre Dame
132	Chicago Bears	Jason Harness	End	Michigan State
133	Baltimore Colts	Bob Clemens	Back	Pittsburgh
134	St. Louis Cardinals	Jimmy King	Tackle	Clemson
135	Detroit Lions	Errol Linden	End	Houston
136	San Francisco 49ers	Paul Hynes	Running back	Louisiana Tech
137	New York Giants	Glen Knight	End	Shaw
138	Green Bay Packers	Buck McLeod	Tackle	Baylor
139	Cleveland Browns	Ken Ericson	End	Syracuse
140	Philadelphia Eagles	Luther Hayes	End	USC

=== Round 11 ===
Pick #	NFL team	Player	Position	College
141	Minnesota Vikings	Jerry Mays	Tackle	Southern Methodist
142	Dallas Cowboys	Norris Stevenson	Back	Missouri
143	Washington Redskins	Riley Mattson	Tackle	Oregon
144	Los Angeles Rams	Bob Lane	End	Baylor
145	Chicago Bears	Sam Fewell	Tackle	South Carolina
146	Pittsburgh Steelers	Henry Clement	Back	North Carolina
147	Baltimore Colts	Ralph White	Tackle	Bowling Green
148	St. Louis Cardinals	Bill Kinnune	Guard	Washington
149	San Francisco 49ers	Tony Parrilli	Guard	Illinois
150	Detroit Lions	Larry Vargo	End	Detroit
151	New York Giants	Bob Benton	Tackle	Mississippi
152	Green Bay Packers	Val Keckin	Back	Southern Mississippi
153	Cleveland Browns	Billy Gault	Back	Texas Christian
154	Philadelphia Eagles	L.E. Hicks	Tackle	Florida

=== Round 12 ===
Pick #	NFL team	Player	Position	College
155	Minnesota Vikings	Steve Stonebreaker	End	Detroit
156	Dallas Cowboys	Lowndes Shingler	Quarterback	Clemson
157	Washington Redskins	Bob Coolbaugh	End	Richmond
158	Los Angeles Rams	Walt Mince	Back	Arizona
159	Pittsburgh Steelers	Frank Jackunas	Tackle	Detroit
160	Chicago Bears	Howard Dyer	Quarterback	Virginia Military Inst
161	Baltimore Colts	Dick Reynolds	Tackle	North Carolina State
162	St. Louis Cardinals	Mike Stock	Back	Northwestern
163	Detroit Lions	Tom Rodgers	Back	Kentucky
164	San Francisco 49ers	Don Coffey	End	Memphis State
165	New York Giants	Jack Moynihan	Quarterback	Holy Cross
166	Green Bay Packers	John Denvir	Tackle	Colorado
167	Cleveland Browns	Dick Lage	End	Lenoir-Rhyne
168	Philadelphia Eagles	Billy Majors	Back	Tennessee

=== Round 13 ===
Pick #	NFL team	Player	Position	College
169	Minnesota Vikings	Ray Hayes	Running back	Central State (OK)
170	Dallas Cowboys	Don Goodman	Back	Florida
171	Washington Redskins	Doug Elmore	Back	Mississippi
172	Los Angeles Rams	Mike McKeever	Guard	USC
173	Chicago Bears	Bob McLeod	End	Abilene Christian
174	San Francisco 49ers	Tommy Hackler	End	Tennessee Tech
175	Baltimore Colts	Dallas Garber	Back	Marietta
176	St. Louis Cardinals	Ernie McMillan	End	Illinois
177	San Francisco 49ers	Julius Fincke	Tackle	McNeese State
178	Detroit Lions	Paul Hodge	Linebacker	Pittsburgh
179	New York Giants	Jerry Fields	Back	Ohio State
180	Green Bay Packers	Elijah Pitts	Back	Philander Smith
181	Cleveland Browns	Jack Wilson	Back	Duke
182	Philadelphia Eagles	Don Jonas	Quarterback	Penn State

=== Round 14 ===
Pick #	NFL team	Player	Position	College
183	Minnesota Vikings	Ken Petersen	Tackle	Utah
184	Dallas Cowboys	Billy Shaw	Tackle	Georgia Tech
185	Washington Redskins	Doyle Schick	Back	Kansas
186	Los Angeles Rams	David "Deacon" Jones	Defensive end	Mississippi Valley State
187	Pittsburgh Steelers	Bob Schmitz	Guard	Montana State
188	Chicago Bears	Jim Tyrer	Tackle	Ohio State
189	Baltimore Colts	Bob Hunt	Tackle	Southern Methodist
190	St. Louis Cardinals	Bob Elliot	Running back	North Carolina
191	Detroit Lions	Charley Bowers	Running back	Arizona State
192	San Francisco 49ers	Bill Worrell	Tackle	Georgia
193	New York Giants	Eugene White	Back	Florida A&M
194	Green Bay Packers	Nelson Toburen	End	Wichita State
195	Cleveland Browns	Phil Lohman	Center	Oklahoma
196	Philadelphia Eagles	Willie Fleming	Running back	Iowa

=== Round 15 ===
Pick #	NFL team	Player	Position	College
197	Minnesota Vikings	Mike Mercer	End	Arizona State
198	Dallas Cowboys	Julius Varnado	Tackle	Cal State-San Francisco
199	Washington Redskins	Bob Johnson	End	Michigan
200	Los Angeles Rams	Ernie Wright	Tackle	Ohio State
201	Chicago Bears	Chuck Linning	Tackle	Miami (FL)
202	Pittsburgh Steelers	Ray McCown	Back	West Texas State
203	Baltimore Colts	E. A. Sims	End	New Mexico State
204	St. Louis Cardinals	Mel West	Back	Missouri
205	San Francisco 49ers	Bob Sams	Tackle	Central State (OK)
206	Detroit Lions	Mike Lauber	End	Wisconsin–River Falls
207	New York Giants	Cody Binkley	Center	Vanderbilt
208	Green Bay Packers	Ray Lardani	Tackle	Miami (FL)
209	Cleveland Browns	Charley Taylor	Back	Mississippi
210	Philadelphia Eagles	Bobby Richards	Tackle	Louisiana State

=== Round 16 ===
Pick #	NFL team	Player	Position	College
211	Minnesota Vikings	Ted Karpowicz	Running back	Detroit
212	Dallas Cowboys	Jerry Steffen	Back	Colorado
213	Washington Redskins	Ron Petty	Tackle	Louisville
214	Los Angeles Rams	Mike Zeno	Guard	Virginia Tech
215	Pittsburgh Steelers	Wilbert Scott	Back	Indiana
216	Chicago Bears	Wayne Frazier	Center	Auburn
217	Baltimore Colts	Tom Wiesner	Back	Wisconsin
218	St. Louis Cardinals	Jake Bradley	Tackle	Florida A&M
219	Detroit Lions	Gus Krantz	Tackle	Northern Michigan
220	San Francisco 49ers	Charley Fuller	Running back	Cal State-San Francisco
221	New York Giants	Bernie Vishneski	Tackle	Virginia Tech
222	Green Bay Packers	Clarence Mason	End	Bowling Green
223	Cleveland Browns	Roger Shoals	Tackle	Maryland
224	Philadelphia Eagles	G. W. Clapp	Guard	Auburn

=== Round 17 ===
Pick #	NFL team	Player	Position	College
225	Minnesota Vikings	Willie Jones	Back	Purdue
226	Dallas Cowboys	Everett Cloud	Back	Maryland
227	Washington Redskins	Joe Bellino	Back	Navy
228	Los Angeles Rams	Chuck Allen	Guard	Washington
229	Chicago Bears	Rossie Barfield	End	North Carolina Central
230	Pittsburgh Steelers	Terry Nofsinger	Quarterback	Utah
231	Baltimore Colts	Steve Jastrzembski	Back	Pittsburgh
232	St. Louis Cardinals	Pat Fischer	Back	Nebraska
233	San Francisco 49ers	Tom Jewell	Tackle	Idaho State
234	Detroit Lions	Tom Goode	Linebacker	Mississippi State
235	New York Giants	Sylvester Cooper	Tackle	Bakersfield J.C.
236	Green Bay Packers	Jim Brewington	Tackle	North Carolina Central
237	Cleveland Browns	Calvin Bird	Back	Kentucky
238	Philadelphia Eagles	Larry Lavery	Tackle	Illinois

=== Round 18 ===
Pick #	NFL team	Player	Position	College
239	Minnesota Vikings	Bob Voight	Tackle	Cal State-Los Angeles
240	Dallas Cowboys	Randy Williams	Back	Indiana
241	Washington Redskins	George Tolford	Tackle	Ohio State
242	Los Angeles Rams	Bill Williamson	Tackle	Bakersfield J.C.
243	Pittsburgh Steelers	John Simko	End	Augustana (SD)
244	Chicago Bears	John Finn	Tackle	Louisville
245	Baltimore Colts	Wilson Allison	Tackle	Baylor
246	St. Louis Cardinals	Art Browning	Guard	Duke
247	Detroit Lions	John Gregor	Tackle	Montana
248	San Francisco 49ers	Kay McFarland	Running back	Colorado State
249	New York Giants	Ken DesMarais	Center	Holy Cross
250	Green Bay Packers	Arthur Sims	Back	Texas A&M
251	Cleveland Browns	Ed Morris	Tackle	Indiana
252	Philadelphia Eagles	Nick Maravich	Tackle	North Carolina State

=== Round 19 ===
Pick #	NFL team	Player	Position	College
253	Minnesota Vikings	Bill Hill	Running back	Presbyterian
254	Dallas Cowboys	Lynn Hoyem	Center	Long Beach State
255	Washington Redskins	Tony Romeo	End	Florida State
256	Los Angeles Rams	Lou Zivkovich	Tackle	New Mexico State
257	Chicago Bears	Ben Charles	Quarterback	South Carolina
258	Pittsburgh Steelers	Bernard Wyatt	Back	Iowa
259	Baltimore Colts	Joe Novsek	Tackle	Tulsa
260	St. Louis Cardinals	Dick Schnell	Tackle	Wyoming
261	San Francisco 49ers	Tom Simpson	Tackle	Davidson
262	Detroit Lions	Gene Valesano	Back	Northern Michigan
263	New York Giants	Bob Reublin	Back	Bowling Green
264	Green Bay Packers	Leland Bondhus	Tackle	South Dakota State
265	Cleveland Browns	Bob Minihane	Guard	Boston University
266	Philadelphia Eagles	Dick Wilson	Center	Penn State

=== Round 20 ===
Pick #	NFL team	Player	Position	College
267	Minnesota Vikings	Mike McFarland	Quarterback	Western Illinois
268	Dallas Cowboys	Jerry Morgan	Back	Iowa State
269	Washington Redskins	Mike Ingram	Guard	Ohio State
270	Los Angeles Rams	Al Lederle	End	Georgia Tech
271	Pittsburgh Steelers	Mike Jones	Quarterback	San Jose State
272	Chicago Bears	Gordon Mason	Back	Tennessee Tech
273	Baltimore Colts	Albert Kimbrough	Back	Northwestern
274	St. Louis Cardinals	Leo Reed	End	Colorado State
275	Detroit Lions	Tom Lewis	Back	Lake Forest
276	San Francisco 49ers	Jerry Perry	Guard	Central State (OK)
277	New York Giants	Don McKeta	Back	Washington
278	Green Bay Packers	Ray Ratkowski	Back	Notre Dame
279	Cleveland Browns	Charlie Baker	Tackle	Tennessee
280	Philadelphia Eagles	Jacque MacKinnon	Back	Colgate

= Pro Bowler	= AFL All-Star	= Hall of Famer

== Hall of Famers ==
- Herb Adderley, running back from Michigan State taken 1st round 14th overall by the Green Bay Packers.

Inducted: Professional Football Hall of Fame class of 1980.

- Bob Lilly, tackle from Texas Christian University taken 1st round 13th overall by the Dallas Cowboys.

Inducted: Professional Football Hall of Fame class of 1980,

- David "Deacon" Jones, defensive end from South Carolina State taken 14th round 186th overall by the Los Angeles Rams.

Inducted: Professional Football Hall of Fame class of 1980.

- Fran Tarkenton, quarterback from Georgia taken 3rd round 29th overall by the Minnesota Vikings.

Inducted: Professional Football Hall of Fame class of 1986.

- Mike Ditka, tight end from the University of Pittsburgh taken 1st round 5th overall by the Chicago Bears.

Inducted: Professional Football Hall of Fame class of 1988.

- James Earl "Jimmy" Johnson, running back from UCLA taken 1st round 6th overall by the San Francisco 49ers.

Inducted: Professional Football Hall of Fame class of 1994.

- Billy Shaw, offensive guard from Georgia Tech taken 14th round 184th overall by the Dallas Cowboys, signed by the Buffalo Bills of the AFL.

Inducted: Pro Football Hall of Fame class of 1999.

== Notable undrafted players ==
^{†}	= Pro Bowler

Original NFL team	Player	Pos.	College	Notes
Baltimore Colts	Mark Smolinski	FB/TE	Wyoming	
Cleveland Browns	Charley Ferguson ^{†}	TE	Tennessee State	
Chicago Bears	Art Anderson	T	Idaho	
Chicago Bears	Roosevelt Taylor ^{†}	S	Grambling State	
Dallas Cowboys	Dave Grayson ^{†}	CB	Oregon	
Dallas Cowboys	Warren Livingston	CB	Arizona	
Dallas Cowboys	Amos Marsh	RB	Oregon State	
Detroit Lions	Pat Studstill ^{†}	WR	Houston	
Philadelphia Eagles	Glen Amerson	DB	Texas Tech	
Pittsburgh Steelers	Willie Daniel	CB	Mississippi State	
San Francisco 49ers	J.W. Lockett	FB	Central Oklahoma	

== See also ==
- 1961 American Football League draft
