= Dave Grosz =

Canadian football player (1938–2018)

Dave Grosz (August 24, 1938 – September 20, 2018) was a Canadian football quarterback in the Canadian Football League (CFL) who played for the Saskatchewan Roughriders and Montreal Alouettes. He played college football for the Oregon Ducks.
