= John Timu (American football) =

American football player and coach (born 1992)

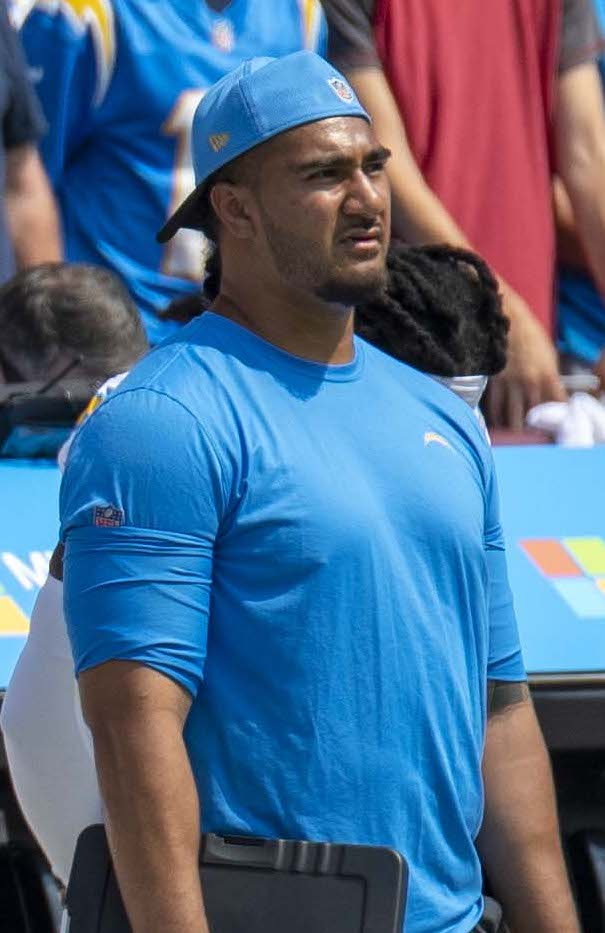
- Timu with the Los Angeles Chargers in 2021

Atlanta Falcons
- Title: Outside linebackers coach

Personal information
- Born: August 27, 1992 (age 34); Long Beach, California, U.S.
- Listed height: 6 ft 0 in (1.83 m)
- Listed weight: 245 lb (111 kg)

Career information
- Position: Linebacker (No. 53)
- High school: Jordan (Long Beach)
- College: Washington
- NFL draft: 2015: undrafted

Career history

Playing
- Chicago Bears (2015–2017); Salt Lake Stallions (2019)

Coaching
- Washington (2019–2020) Graduate assistant; Los Angeles Chargers (2021) Alex G. Spanos Coaching Fellow; Los Angeles Chargers (2022) Defensive assistant; Los Angeles Chargers (2023) Assistant defensive line coach; Atlanta Falcons (2024–2025) Defensive assistant; Atlanta Falcons (2026–present) Outside linebackers coach

Career NFL statistics
- Total tackles: 59
- Fumble recoveries: 2
- Stats at Pro Football Reference

John Sesoga Timu (born August 27, 1992) is an American football coach and former linebacker who is the outside linebackers coach of the Atlanta Falcons of the National Football League (NFL). He played college football for the Washington Huskies before signing with the Chicago Bears as an undrafted free agent in 2015. He also played one season for the Salt Lake Stallions of the Alliance of American Football.

== Early life ==
Born and raised in Long Beach, California to Samoan American parents, Timu attended Jordan High School in Long Beach. Rated the 61st overall safety prospect by scout.com, Timu committed to Washington, where he played linebacker from 2011 to 2014. He played in 51 games at Washington, recording 328 tackles, 4 sacks, 6 interceptions, 4 forced fumbles, and 2 fumble recoveries. Timu was voted honorable mention All-Pac-12 Conference following his senior season in 2014 after he recorded 108 tackles, 2 pass breakups, 2 interceptions and one defensive touchdown.

== Professional career ==
Pre-draft measurables
Height	Weight	Arm length	Hand span	Wingspan	40-yard dash	10-yard split	20-yard split	20-yard shuttle	Three-cone drill	Vertical jump	Broad jump	Bench press
6 ft 0 in (1.83 m)	243 lb (110 kg)	31 5/8 in (0.80 m)	9 1/4 in (0.23 m)	6 ft 3 5/8 in (1.92 m)	4.80 s	1.64 s	2.74 s	4.47 s	7.07 s	32.0 in (0.81 m)	9 ft 4 in (2.84 m)	33 reps
All values from Pro Day

On May 2, 2015, Timu signed with the Chicago Bears as an undrafted free agent following the conclusion of the 2015 NFL draft. On October 6, 2015, Timu was cut from the team. However, days later, he was resigned to the practice squad. On December 15, 2015, Timu was promoted to the 53-man roster. Timu recorded his first career fumble recovery (Timu had a second one in the same game for a career high of two fumble recoveries) against the Tampa Bay Buccaneers on December 27, 2015. He ended the year with 25 tackles and two fumble recoveries.

On September 3, 2016, Timu was released by the Bears as part of final roster cuts. He was signed to the practice squad the next day. He was promoted to the active roster on September 27, 2016.

On September 2, 2017, Timu was waived by the Bears and was signed to the practice squad the next day. He was promoted to the active roster on September 23, 2017.

On March 20, 2018, Timu re-signed with the Bears. He was released on September 1, 2018.

Timu was signed by the Salt Lake Stallions of the Alliance of American Football (AAF) on March 13, 2019. The league ceased operations in April 2019.

== Coaching career ==
=== University of Washington Huskies ===
In September 2019, Timu retired from playing football and was hired by Washington head coach Chris Petersen to start his coaching career as a graduate assistant at his alma mater.

=== Los Angeles Chargers ===
After spending two years as a graduate assistant for Washington, Timu was hired by the Los Angeles Chargers in 2021 as a coaching fellow, assisting with the defensive staff, particularly the defensive line and linebackers. This move reunited Timu with former Chicago Bears outside linebackers coach Brandon Staley, who was in his first year as the Chargers head coach. Timu was promoted to defensive assistant in 2022, and promoted again to assistant defensive line coach in 2023.

=== Atlanta Falcons ===
On February 3, 2024, Timu was hired to be a defensive assistant for the Atlanta Falcons. Timu joined Jay Rodgers who was hired as the Falcons defensive line coach after previously being the defensive run game coordinator/defensive line coach for the Chargers. On February 11, 2026, he was promoted to the role of outside linebackers coach, replacing Jacquies Smith.
