= Maury Youmans =

American football player (born 1936)

No. 82, 78
- Position: Defensive end

Personal information
- Born: October 16, 1936 (age 90); Eagle Bay, New York, U.S.
- Listed height: 6 ft 4 in (1.93 m)
- Listed weight: 251 lb (114 kg)

Career information
- High school: North Syracuse (NY)
- College: Syracuse
- NFL draft: 1959: 9th round, 105th overall pick
- AFL draft: 1960: 2nd round

Career history
- Chicago Bears (1960–1963); Dallas Cowboys (1964–1965); Atlanta Falcons (1966)*; New York Giants (1966)*
- * Offseason or practice squad member only

Awards and highlights
- NFL champion (1963); National champion (1959); Second-team All-Eastern (1959)

Career NFL statistics
- Sacks: 13.5
- Stats at Pro Football Reference

Maurice Edward Youmans (born October 16, 1936) is an American former professional football player who was a defensive end in the National Football League (NFL) for the Chicago Bears and Dallas Cowboys. He played college football for the Syracuse Orange.

== Early life ==
Youmans attended North Syracuse High School, where he initially focused on playing basketball and averaged 20 points a game. He started playing football as a senior. After graduating, he spent one year at Dean Academy to improve his grades.

He accepted a scholarship from Syracuse University and was redshirted as a junior after having back surgery.

As a senior, he became part of a defensive/offensive line known as the "sizeable seven" that also included Bob Yates, Fred Mautino, Al Bemiller, Roger Davis, Bruce Tarbox and Gerry Skonieczki. He blocked for Ernie Davis and was a member of the undefeated national championship team in 1959.

He also lettered in basketball, where he was a backup at center as a sophomore and senior.

== Professional career ==
=== Chicago Bears ===
Youmans was selected by the Chicago Bears in the ninth round (105th overall) of the 1959 NFL draft with a future draft pick, which allowed the team to draft him before his college eligibility was over.

As a rookie, he played left defensive end and his bookend partner was future hall of famer Doug Atkins, but missed games with a dislocated shoulder. After playing all of the games (14) in 1962, the next season he was kneed in the back and missed 8 games.

In 1963, he was placed on the injured reserve list with a knee injury that was complicated by a serious infection. He would end up missing the season the Bears won the NFL Championship.

The next year, he requested a trade thinking he was going to the Green Bay Packers, but instead was sent to the Dallas Cowboys in exchange for offensive end Gary Barnes on June 18, 1964.

=== Dallas Cowboys ===
In 1964, he was the defensive line's top backup and started the last 3 games in place of an injured Larry Stephens. The next season, he was the regular starter at left defensive end but was limited with an unstable knee.

=== Atlanta Falcons ===
After being selected by the Atlanta Falcons in the 1966 NFL expansion draft, he was traded to the New York Giants.

=== New York Giants ===
A knee operation didn't allow him to participate in the New York Giants training camp and was released on September 6, 1966.
