= 1959 All-Eastern football team =

1959 All Eastern Football team information

The 1959 All-Eastern football team consists of American football players chosen by various selectors as the best players at each position among the Eastern colleges and universities during the 1959 college football season.

The undefeated 1959 Syracuse Orangemen football team was ranked No. 1 in the final AP Poll and Coaches Poll. Four Syracuse players were named to the first team by the UPI, including backs Ernie Davis and Gerhard Schwedes, tackle Bob Yates, and guard Roger Davis.

== Backs ==
- Richie Lucas, Penn State (AP-1; UPI-1)
- Gerhard Schwedes, Syracuse (AP-1; UPI-1)
- Art Baker, Syracuse (AP-1; UPI-2)
- Ernie Davis, Syracuse (AP-2; UPI-1)
- Fred Doelling, Penn (AP-1; UPI-2)
- Chester Boulris, Harvard (UPI-1)
- Joe Caldwell, Army (AP-2; UPI-2)
- Pat Botula, Penn State (AP-2; UPI-2)
- Paul Choquette, Brown (AP-2)
- Ivan Toncic, Pitt (AP-3)
- Joe Matalavage, Navy (AP-3)
- Tom Singleton, Yale (AP-3)
- Jim Kerr, Penn State (AP-3)

== Ends ==
- Bill Carpenter, Army (AP-1; UPI-1)
- Mike Ditka, Pittsburgh (AP-1; UPI-1)
- Fred Mautino, Syracuse (AP-1; UPI-2)
- Bob Simms, Rutgers (AP-2)
- Norm Neff, Penn State (AP-2)
- Barney Berlinger, Penn (UPI-2)
- Don Tosi, Boston College (AP-3)
- Bob Federspiel, Columbia (AP-3)

== Tackles ==
- Bob Yates, Syracuse (AP-1; UPI-1)
- Andy Stynchula, Penn State (AP-1; UPI-1)
- Charlie Janerette, Penn State (UPI-2)
- Maury Youmans, Syracuse (AP-2; UPI-2)
- Harry Olivar, Yale (AP-2)
- Bill Lindner, Pitt (AP-3)
- Gordon Batchellor, Princeton (AP-3)

== Guards ==
- Roger Davis, Syracuse (AP-1; UPI-1)
- Larry Vignali, Pittsburgh (AP-1; UPI-1)
- Al Vanderbush, Army (AP-2; UPI-2)
- Earl Kohlhaas, Penn State (UPI-2)
- Vince Promuto, Holy Cross (AP-2)
- Warren Sundstrom, Cornell (AP-3)
- Bruce Tarbox, Syracuse (AP-3)

== Center ==
- Roger LeClerc, Trinity (CT) (AP-1; UPI-1)
- Foge Fazio, Pittsburgh (UPI-2)
- Al Bemiller, Syracuse (AP-2)
- Mike Pyle, Yale (AP-3)

== Key ==
- AP = Associated Press
- UPI = United Press International

== See also ==
- 1959 College Football All-America Team
