= James William Collier =

James William Collier may refer to:

- James Collier (politician) (1872–1933), American politician from Mississippi
- Jim Collier, American football player
