= 1959 All-SEC football team =

American college football all-star team

The 1959 All-SEC football team consists of American football players selected to the All-Southeastern Conference (SEC) chosen by various selectors for the 1959 college football season. Billy Cannon won the Heisman.

== All-SEC selections ==
=== Ends ===
- Jimmy Vickers, Georgia (AP-1, UP-1)
- Larry Grantham, Ole Miss (AP-1, UPI-2)
- Dave Hudson, Florida (AP-3, UPI-1)
- Mickey Mangham, LSU (AP-2, UPI-3)
- Johnny Brewer, Ole Miss (AP-2)
- Jerry Burch, Georgia Tech (UPI-2)
- Lavalle White, Miss. St. (AP-3)
- Cotton Letner, Tennessee (UPI-3)

=== Tackles ===
- Ken Rice, Auburn (AP-1, UPI-1)
- Joe Schaffer, Tennessee (AP-1, UPI-1)
- Larry Wagner, Vanderbilt (AP-2, UPI-3)
- Toby Deese, Georgia Tech (AP-2)
- Bo Strange, LSU (UPI-2)
- Walter Suggs, Miss. St. (UPI-2)
- Lynn LeBlanc, LSU (AP-3)
- Danny Royal, Florida (AP-3)
- Billy Shaw, Georgia Tech (UPI-3)

=== Guards ===
- Marvin Terrell, Ole Miss (AP-1, UPI-1)
- Zeke Smith, Auburn (AP-1, UPI-1)
- Pat Dye, Georgia (AP-2, UPI-2)
- Don Cochran, Alabama (AP-2, UPI-2)
- Billy Roland, Georgia (AP-3)
- Bob Talamini, Kentucky (AP-3)
- Richard Price, Ole Miss (UPI-3)
- Ed McCreedy, LSU (UPI-3)

=== Centers ===
- Maxie Baughan, Georgia Tech (AP-1, UPI-2)
- Jackie Burkett, Auburn (AP-3, UPI-1)
- Tom Goode, Miss. St. (AP-2, UPI-3)

=== Quarterbacks ===
- Fran Tarkenton, Georgia (College Football Hall of Fame) (AP-1, UP-1)
- Jake Gibbs, Ole Miss (AP-2, UPI-2)
- Bobby Hunt, Auburn (AP-3, UPI-2)
- Warren Rabb, LSU (UPI-2)
- Charley Britt, Georgia (UPI-3)

=== Halfbacks ===
- Billy Cannon, LSU (College Football Hall of Fame) (AP-1, UPI-1)
- Tom Moore, Vanderbilt (AP-1, UPI-1)
- Calvin Bird, Kentucky (AP-2, UPI-3)
- Johnny Robinson, LSU (AP-3, UPI-2)
- Bobby Walden, Georgia (AP-2)
- Lamar Rawson, Auburn (AP-3)
- Billy Majors, Tennessee (UPI-3)

=== Fullbacks ===
- Charlie Flowers, Ole Miss (College Football Hall of Fame) (AP-1, UP-1)
- Ed Dyas, Auburn (College Football Hall of Fame) (AP-2, UPI-3)
- Taz Anderson, Georgia Tech (AP-3)

== Key ==
AP = Associated Press

UPI = United Press International

Bold = Consensus first-team selection by both AP and UPI

== See also ==
- 1959 College Football All-America Team
