= Tee Moorman =

Former American football end

Claude "Tee" Moorman
- Moorman, 1960

No. 85
- Position: end

Personal information
- Born: August 21, 1939; Roanoke, Virginia, U.S.
- Died: April 28, 2009 (aged 69); Plymouth, North Carolina, U.S.
- Listed height: 6 ft 3 in (1.91 m)
- Listed weight: 210 lb (95 kg)

Career information
- High school: Miami (FL)
- College: Duke (1957-1960)

Awards and highlights
- First-team All-American (1960)

Claude Thurman "Tee" Moorman II (August 21, 1939 - April 28, 2009) was an American football end and medical doctor. He played college football for the Duke Blue Devils from 1957 to 1960. As a senior in 1960, he led the ACC and ranked second nationally with 46 receptions; he also led the ACC and ranked sixth nationally with 431 receiving yards.

Moorman was selected by the Football Writers Association of America as a first-team end on the 1960 All-America college football team. He also received second-team honors from the American Football Coaches Association and the United Press International.

Moorman was drafted by the Dallas Texans in the fourth round (28th overall pick) of the 1961 NFL draft. He received a medical degree from Duke in 1966 and a law degree from William & Mary in 1979. He served in the U.S. Army for many years, including service in Vietnam, and retired as a colonel in 1998. He was inducted into the Duke Athletics Hall of Fame. He died in 2009 at age 69 and was buried at Arlington National Cemetery.
