= Walter Suggs =

American football player (1939–2022)

No. 76
- Positions: Defensive end, offensive tackle

Personal information
- Born: May 15, 1939; Hattiesburg, Mississippi, U.S.
- Died: September 5, 2022 (aged 83)
- Listed height: 6 ft 5 in (1.96 m)
- Listed weight: 260 lb (118 kg)

Career information
- High school: Forrest County (MS)
- College: Mississippi State
- AFL draft: 1961: 3rd round, 24th overall pick

Career history
- Houston Oilers (1962–1971)

Awards and highlights
- 2× AFL All-Star (1967, 1968); 2× Second-team All-SEC (1959, 1960)

Career statistics
- Games played: 137
- Stats at Pro Football Reference

William Walter Suggs Jr. (May 15, 1939 – September 5, 2022) was a college and professional American football player. An offensive and defensive lineman, he played college football at Mississippi State University, and played professionally in the American Football League (AFL) for the Houston Oilers from 1962 through 1969, and for the National Football League (NFL) Oilers in 1970 and 1971. Suggs played in 137 consecutive games. He played in the first pro football game played in the Houston Astrodome in 1968. He was an American Football League All-Star in 1967 and 1968.

== Early life ==
Suggs was born on May 15, 1939, in Hattiesburg, Mississippi. He attended Forrest County Agricultural High School in Brooklyn, Mississippi, where he boarded and played on the football team in the DeSoto Conference. Suggs was junior class president (1955-56). He was selected All-State and All-DeSoto Conference in football. In 1956, he was named Most Outstanding Lineman in the DeSoto Conference. While tackle was his primary position, he also filled in as a fullback, once scoring three touchdowns in a championship game (one receiving and two rushing) in leading Forrest to the DeSoto Conference title with a perfect 11–0 record in 1956. Suggs played in the August 1957 Mississippi High School All-Star Football Game as a 230 lb. (104.3 kg) tackle.

== College career ==
Suggs attended Mississippi State University on a football scholarship, graduating in 1961. He played offensive tackle on the football team in the Southeastern Conference (SEC). The 6 ft 5 in (1.96 m), 228 lb. (103.4 kg) Suggs got his first start at right tackle as a sophomore early in the 1958 season. Going into the 1959 season, the 240 lb. (108.9 kg) Suggs was considered one of the best tackles in the conference. He was named team captain as a senior.

United Press International (UPI) named Suggs second-team All-SEC as a junior (1959) and a senior (1960) at tackle. He also was named to the All-SEC Academic team in 1960. In early January 1961, he was named a third-team Academic All-American. Suggs was selected to play in the Senior Bowl (January 7, 1961) and in the Blue Gray Game (December 31, 1960).

== Professional career ==
The Houston Oilers selected Suggs in the third round of the 1961 AFL draft, 24th overall. Suggs was not selected by any team in the NFL draft, and he signed with the Oilers in December 1960. The Oilers also drafted Suggs' Mississippi State teammate Tom Goode, a center and second-team All-American, who went on to play with Suggs in Houston from 1962 to 1965.

Neither Suggs nor Goode were on the Oilers' 1961 roster, beginning their rookie seasons in 1962. As a rookie in 1962, Suggs was a backup tackle and did not start any games. Suggs became the Oilers' starting left tackle in 1963, playing next to six-time AFL All-Star left guard Bob Talamini. Suggs and Talamini would play every game as starters side-by-side from 1963 through 1967, until Talamini was traded to the New York Jets.

The Oilers had won the AFL's first two championships in 1960 and 1961, and lost the 1962 championship game in overtime, behind future Pro Football Hall of Fame quarterback George Blanda, and star players such as former Heisman Trophy winner Billy Cannon, and AFL All-Stars Charlie Tolar and Charley Hennigan on offense. The 1962 double-overtime championship game is the second longest game in AFL/NFL history, going 77 minutes and 54 seconds.

From 1963 through 1966, however, the team was never above .500 and the Oilers' record was 6–8, 4–10, 4–10 and 3–11, respectively. By 1967, the 40-year old Blanda, Cannon, Tolar and Hennigan were no longer with the team.

In 1967, the Oilers had a 9–4–1 record and reached the AFL championship game against the Oakland Raiders, losing 40–7. That year, Suggs was selected to play in the AFL All-Star game for the first time. He also was named first-team All-AFL by The Sporting News, and second-team All-AFL by the Associated Press (AP), Newspaper Enterprise Association (NEA) and UPI.

In 1968, the Oilers fell to 7–7. Now starting and playing all 14 games alongside left guard Tom Regner, Suggs was again named to the AFL All-Star game, and was again named first-team All-AFL by The Sporting News, and second-team All-AFL by the AP, NEA and UPI. In 1968, he played in the first professional football game played in the Houston Astrodome. In 1969, again starting all 14 games next to Regner, for a third time Suggs was named second-team All-AFL by the AP, NEA and UPI.

In 1970, the Oilers fell to 3–10–1. For the eighth consecutive season, Suggs started all 14 games at left tackle for the Oilers; but it was his last season as a full-time starter at left tackle. In 1971 he divided time at left tackle with Gene Ferguson, and center with Jerry Sturm (a position he hated playing); starting 10 games overall during the season.

Suggs underwent knee surgery in January 1972 after the season ended, and the knee was not healed by the time of the Oilers' 1972 training camp in August. While he was already a successful homebuilder in the off season, he wanted to play one more year with the Oilers. Though Suggs thought it was possible to rehabilitate his knee, he believed that even if successful, another knee injury would leave his knee permanently damaged. Suggs decided to retire in September 1972, before the season started, rather than take that risk. Over a year later, Suggs still had persistent pain in his knee.

Overall during his career, Suggs played in 137 consecutive games for the Oilers; then a team record.

== Honors ==
Suggs was selected to the Oilers All 30 Year Team in 1991, the Mississippi State Hall of Fame in 1989 and the Mississippi Sports Hall of Fame in 2006. In 1969, he received the Newspaper Enterprise Association's Third Down Trophy award, given to the most valuable player on each AFL team.

== Personal life ==
After retiring from football in 1971, Suggs became a full-time home builder in Texas and Tennessee, until retiring from the general contracting business in 2012.

== Death ==
Suggs died on September 5, 2022. He was survived by his wife of 61 years, Emily Moorer, two children, four grandchildren and four great-grandchildren.

== See also ==
- Other American Football League players
