= 1960 All-SEC football team =

Southeastern Conference football honors

The 1960 All-SEC football team is made up of the American football players that were selected for the All-Southeastern Conference (SEC). They were chosen by various selectors for the 1960 college football season.

== All-SEC selections ==
=== Ends ===
- Johnny Brewer, Ole Miss (AP-1, UPI-1)
- Pat Patchen, Florida (AP-2, UPI-1)
- Tom Hutchinson, Kentucky (AP-1, UPI-3)
- Jerry Burch, Georgia Tech (AP-2, UPI-2)
- Cotton Letner, Tennessee (UPI-2)
- Mickey Mangham, LSU (UPI-3)

=== Tackles ===
- Ken Rice, Auburn (AP-1, UPI-1)
- Billy Shaw, Georgia Tech (AP-1, UPI-1)
- Billy Wilson, Auburn (AP-2, UPI-2)
- Bob Benton, Ole Miss (AP-2, UPI-3)
- Walter Suggs, Miss. St. (UPI-2)
- Ed Nutting, Georgia Tech (UPI-3)

=== Guards ===
- Vic Miranda, Florida (AP-1, UPI-1)
- Richard Price, Ole Miss (AP-1, UPI-2)
- Pat Dye, Georgia (AP-2, UPI-1)
- Roy Winston, LSU (AP-2)
- Billy Neighbors, Alabama (UPI-2)
- Ed McCreedy, LSU (UPI-3)
- Lloyd Hodge, Kentucky (UPI-3)

=== Centers ===
- Tom Goode, Miss. St. (AP-1, UPI-1)
- Charles Strange, LSU (AP-2, UPI-2)
- Cody Binkley, Vanderbilt (UPI-3)

=== Quarterbacks ===
- Fran Tarkenton, Georgia (College Football Hall of Fame) (AP-1, UPI-1)
- Jake Gibbs, Ole Miss (AP-1, UPI-1)

=== Halfbacks ===
- Tommy Mason, Tulane (AP-1, UPI-1)
- Larry Libertore, Florida (AP-2, UPI-2)
- Fred Brown, Georgia (AP-2, UPI-2)
- Billy Williamson, Georgia Tech (AP-2, UPI-2)
- Jim Anderson, Ole Miss (AP-2, UPI-3)
- Glenn Glass, Tennessee (UPI-2)
- Calvin Bird, Kentucky (UPI-3)
- Don R., Florida (UPI-3)
- Chick Graning, Georgia Tech (UPI-3)

=== Fullbacks ===
- Ed Dyas, Auburn (College Football Hall of Fame) (AP-1, UPI-1)

== Key ==
AP = Associated Press

UPI = United Press International

Bold = Consensus first-team selection by both AP and UPI

== See also ==
- 1960 College Football All-America Team
