= Foge Fazio =

American football player and coach (1938–2009)

Biographical details
- Born: February 28, 1938; Dawmont, West Virginia, U.S.
- Died: December 2, 2009 (aged 71); Pittsburgh, Pennsylvania, U.S.

Playing career
- 1957–1960: Pittsburgh
- Positions: Center, linebacker

Coaching career (HC unless noted)
- 1962: Pittsburgh (GA)
- 1967: Boston University (assistant)
- 1968: Harvard (assistant)
- 1969–1972: Pittsburgh (assistant)
- 1973–1976: Cincinnati (assistant)
- 1977–1981: Pittsburgh (DC/LB)
- 1982–1985: Pittsburgh
- 1986–1987: Notre Dame (DC)
- 1988–1989: Atlanta Falcons (TE/ST)
- 1990–1994: New York Jets (LB)
- 1995–1999: Minnesota Vikings (LB/DC)
- 2000: Washington Redskins (LB)
- 2001–2002: Cleveland Browns (DC)

Head coaching record
- Overall: 25–18–3
- Bowls: 0–2

Accomplishments and honors

Awards
- Second-team All-Eastern (1959)

Serafino Dante "Foge" Fazio (February 28, 1938 – December 2, 2009) was an American football player and coach. He served as the head football coach at the University of Pittsburgh from 1982 to 1985. Fazio was an assistant coach with five teams in the National Football League (NFL) between 1988 and 2002.

Fazio played linebacker and center at the University of Pittsburgh, and was drafted by the Boston Patriots of the American Football League, but never played professionally. He returned to Coraopolis, Pennsylvania, where he grew up, to begin his coaching career at the high school level, and then moved to the college ranks. He was hired as head coach by his alma mater, Pitt in 1982, having previously been defensive coordinator under Jackie Sherrill, leading the team to a 25–18–3 record in four seasons before being fired. Several of Fazio's defenses have been acclaimed as some of the best units in college football history, particularly the #2-ranked 1980 team which featured several players who went on to have successful careers in the NFL, including Rickey Jackson, Bill Maas, Carlton Williamson, and Hugh Green, who finished second in the 1980 Heisman Trophy balloting. After Fazio's stint as head coach at Pitt, Lou Holtz then hired him to serve as the defensive coordinator at the University of Notre Dame. At the college level, Fazio also coached at Boston University, Harvard University and the University of Cincinnati.

Fazio moved to the NFL in 1988, coaching for the Atlanta Falcons and New York Jets before becoming the defensive coordinator of the Minnesota Vikings in 1995. He left the Vikings in 1999 and spent a year as the linebackers coach of the Washington Redskins before his hiring as the defensive coordinator of the Cleveland Browns in 2001. He retired from the Browns in 2003, but was hired as a defensive consultant by Mike Tice of the Vikings in the 2005 season.

Following his retirement from coaching he did color commentary for the radio broadcast of Pitt football games during the 2008 and 2009 seasons. Fazio died on December 2, 2009, at the age of 71, as the result of a long bout with leukemia.

== Head coaching record ==
Year	Team	Overall	Conference	Standing	Bowl/playoffs	Coaches^{#}	AP^{°}
Pittsburgh Panthers (NCAA Division I-A independent) (1982–1985)
1982	Pittsburgh	9–3			L Cotton	9	10
1983	Pittsburgh	8–3–1			L Fiesta	19	18
1984	Pittsburgh	3–7–1					
1985	Pittsburgh	5–5–1					
Pittsburgh:		25–18–3					
Total:		25–18–3					
^{#}Rankings from final Coaches Poll.; ^{°}Rankings from final AP Poll.
