= Cotton Letner =

American football player (1937–2009)

- Letner, circa 1961

No. 54, 81
- Position: Linebacker

Personal information
- Born: January 26, 1937; Ten Mile, Tennessee, U.S.
- Died: May 17, 2009 (aged 72); Chattanooga, Tennessee, U.S.
- Listed height: 6 ft 1 in (1.85 m)
- Listed weight: 215 lb (98 kg)

Career information
- High school: Meigs County (Decatur, Tennessee)
- College: Tennessee (1957–1960)
- NFL draft: 1961: undrafted

Career history
- Montreal Alouettes (1961)*; Buffalo Bills (1961); Chattanooga Cherokees (1963–1965)
- * Offseason or practice squad member only

Awards and highlights
- Second-team All-SEC (1960); Third-team All-SEC (1959)
- Stats at Pro Football Reference

Robert Gene "Cotton" Letner (January 26, 1937 – May 17, 2009) was an American professional football linebacker who played for the Buffalo Bills of the American Football League (AFL). He played college football for the Tennessee Volunteers.

== Early life ==
Robert Gene Letner was born on January 26, 1937, in Ten Mile, Tennessee. He attended Meigs County High School in Decatur, Tennessee, earning all-state honors in both football and basketball.

== College career ==
Letner enrolled at the University of Tennessee to play college football for the Volunteers as a two-way end and placekicker. He was on the freshman team in 1957 and was a three-year varsity football letterman from 1958 to 1960. He also earned a letter on the track team. In the 1959 football season opener, Letner kicked a 20-yard field goal to help Tennessee beat No. 3 Auburn by a score of 3–0, ending Auburn's 29-game winning streak. On November 7, 1959, his extra points were the deciding margin in a 14–13 victory over No. 1 LSU, which ended LSU's 22-game winning streak.

Letner's eight receptions in 1959 were the most on the team. He finished his college career with ten receptions for 138 yards, five field goals on seven attempts, and 27 extra points on 33 attempts. He had a 70-yard interception return touchdown in his final college game. Letner was named third-team All-SEC by United Press International (UPI) in 1959 and second-team All-SEC by UPI in 1960. At the conclusion of his college career, Letner played in the Blue–Gray Football Classic and was named the defensive MVP. He graduated from Tennessee with a transportation degree.

== Professional career ==
Letner went undrafted in the 1961 NFL and AFL drafts. He signed with the Montreal Alouettes of the Canadian Football League in March 1961. He was released on August 7, 1961, before the start of the regular season.

On August 24, 1961, it was reported that Letner had signed with the Buffalo Bills of the American Football League. Head coach Buster Ramsey said that Letner would play linebacker during the Bills' exhibition game against the Boston Patriots on August 25. After linebacker Joe Hergert was released, Stew Barber and Letner were promoted to the active roster on November 9. It was suspected that Lenter would share placekicking duties with punter Billy Atkins but Letner did not end up attempting a kick all season. He played in the final five games of the season for the Bills, starting one at linebacker. He was waived by the Bills on April 9, 1962.

Letner played end and placekicker for the Chattanooga Cherokees of the Southern Football League from 1963 to 1965, scoring six field goals and 51 extra points. He was also an assistant coach with the Cherokees all three years.

== Post-playing career ==
Letner was an assistant coach for the Chattanooga Redskins of the North American Football League in 1964. He worked at Chattem, Inc. before retiring. He was inducted into the Greater Chattanooga Sports Hall of Fame in 2005. Letner died on May 17, 2009, in Chattanooga.
