= Johnny Brewer =

American football player (1937–2011)

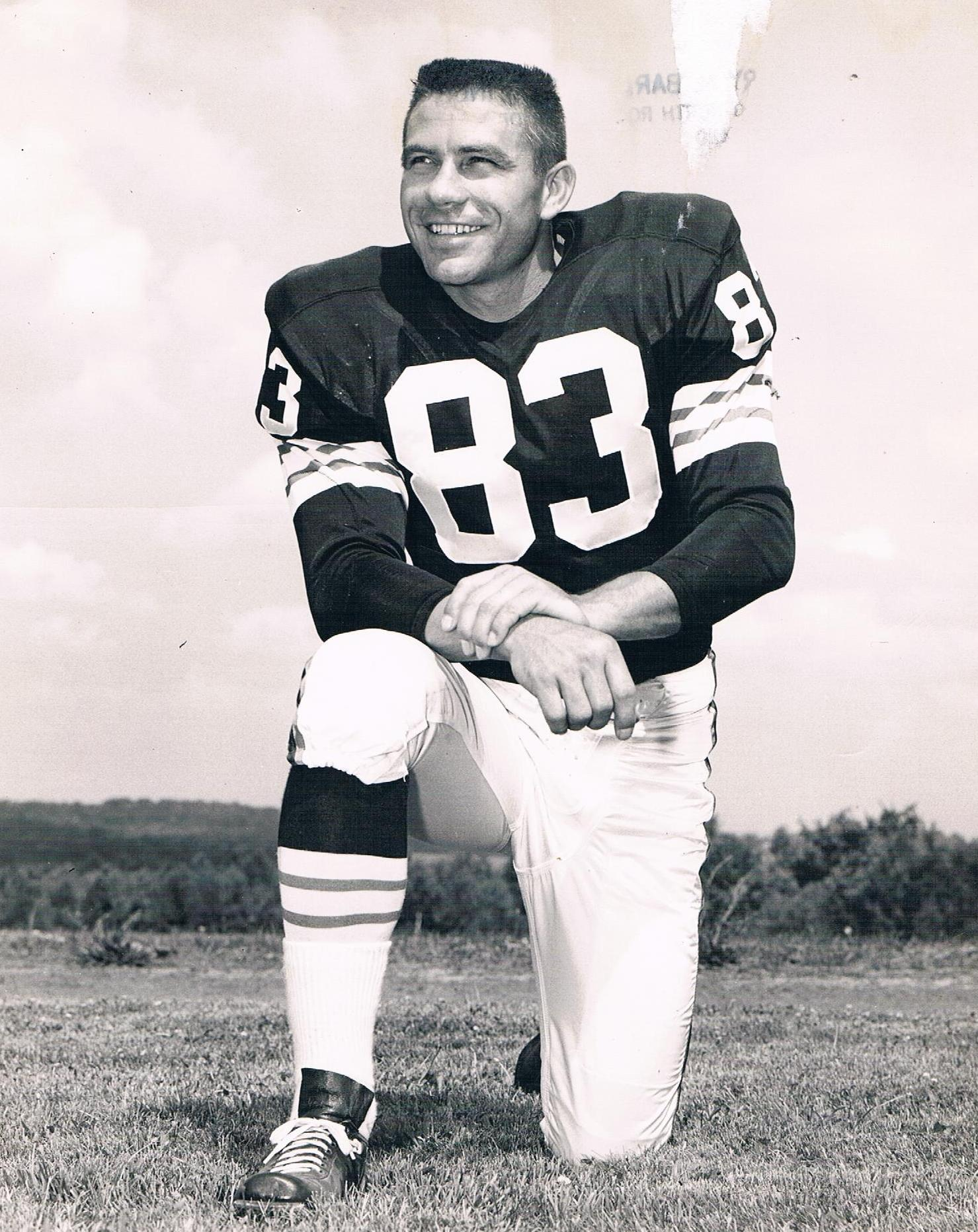
- Brewer as a player for the Cleveland Browns

No. 83, 82
- Positions: Tight end, linebacker, defensive end

Personal information
- Born: March 8, 1937; Vicksburg, Mississippi, U.S.
- Died: May 27, 2011 (aged 74); Madison, Mississippi, U.S.
- Listed height: 6 ft 4 in (1.93 m)
- Listed weight: 230 lb (104 kg)

Career information
- College: Ole Miss
- NFL draft: 1960: 4th round, 41st overall pick
- AFL draft: 1960

Career history
- Cleveland Browns (1961–1967); New Orleans Saints (1968–1970)

Awards and highlights
- NFL champion (1964); Pro Bowl (1966); National champion (1960); Third-team All-American (1960); First-team All-SEC (1960); Second-team All-SEC (1959)

Career NFL statistics
- Receptions: 89
- Receiving yards: 1,256
- Interceptions: 3
- Fumble recoveries: 7
- Total touchdowns: 7
- Stats at Pro Football Reference

Johnny Lee Brewer (March 8, 1937 – May 27, 2011) was an American professional football player who was a tight end and linebacker in the National Football League (NFL) for the Cleveland Browns and New Orleans Saints. He played college football for the Ole Miss Rebels.

Brewer was a fourth round selection by the Cleveland Browns in the 1960 NFL Draft, and was also selected by the Minneapolis AFL team of the newly formed American Football League. The Browns also selected Ole Miss teammates Bobby Franklin in the eleventh round and Robert Khayat in the sixth round.

He was a member of the Browns teams that won the NFL championship in 1964 over the heavily favored Baltimore Colts and the 1965 Eastern Conference championship team that lost the title game to the Green Bay Packers.

Brewer played slot end/tight end for the Browns until 1966 when he was converted to linebacker with the impending retirement of linebacker Galen Fiss and the presence of first round draft pick Milt Morin.

Brewer announced his retirement from professional football in January 1968 to go into the insurance business. Later in the year, Brewer decided he would play football again if the Browns would trade him to a team closer to his home and insurance business. The Browns traded him the New Orleans Saints in mid-August. The Browns acquired a 1970 second round draft pick in exchange for Brewer; they used that pick to draft defensive end Joe “Turkey” Jones. Brewer announced his retirement from the Saints in November 1970.

He was married to Anita Wood for 46 years from 1965 until his death in 2011.
