= Bill Carpenter =

American military officer and football player (born 1937)

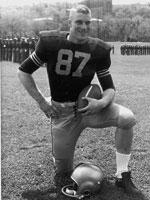

Profile
- Position: End

Personal information
- Born: September 30, 1937 (age 89); Springfield, Pennsylvania, U.S.
- Listed height: 6 ft 2 in (1.88 m)
- Listed weight: 210 lb (95 kg)

Career information
- High school: Springfield High School
- College: Army

Career history
- 1957–1959: Army

Awards and highlights
- Consensus All-American (1959); First-team All-Eastern (1959)
- College Football Hall of Fame (Class of 1982)

Other information
- Military career
- Allegiance: United States
- Branch: United States Army
- Rank: Lieutenant General
- Commands: 10th Mountain Division
- Conflicts: Vietnam War
- Awards: Distinguished Service Cross; Defense Distinguished Service Medal; Army Distinguished Service Medal (2); Silver Star; Legion of Merit

William Stanley Carpenter Jr. (born September 30, 1937) is a retired American military officer and former college football player. While playing college football at the United States Military Academy, he gained national prominence as the "Lonesome End" of the Army football team. During his military service in the Vietnam War, he again achieved fame when he saved his company by directing airstrikes on his own position. For the action, he was awarded the Distinguished Service Cross.

== Personal life ==
Carpenter was born in Springfield, Pennsylvania, on September 30, 1937, to William Stanley Carpenter Sr. (1907–1945) and Helen Carpenter (née Sparks). Private First Class Carpenter Sr. served in the United States Army as an ammunition bearer in the 393rd Infantry Regiment, 99th Infantry Division and was killed in action in the Ruhr Pocket. He is interred in Margraten, Netherlands, at the Netherlands American Cemetery. Helen remarried and relocated the family to the Philadelphia area.

Carpenter was a 1955 graduate of Springfield High School, Springfield, Pennsylvania and later attended the Manlius School (now Manlius Pebble Hill School) in Manlius, New York.

Carpenter married Toni M. Vigliotti in 1961 and had three children: William S. Carpenter III (1962), Kenneth Carpenter (1964), and Stephen Carpenter (1965).

== College football career ==
While attending the United States Military Academy at West Point, Carpenter played as a split end on the football team, alongside Heisman Trophy-winning halfback and fellow combat infantryman Pete Dawkins. Carpenter earned the nickname the "Lonesome End" as a result of the team's tactic of aligning him near the far sideline and leaving him outside of huddles. The goal of the strategy was for Carpenter, using hand signals to communicate with the quarterback, to draw double coverage from opposing defenses and open the field for the Black Knights' running game. He played on the undefeated 1958 West Point team, and in 1959, while team captain, was named an All-American. Legendary Army head coach Earl Blaik, who spent twenty years on the Army coaching staff, called Carpenter "the greatest end I ever coached at West Point."

In 1982, Carpenter was inducted into the College Football Hall of Fame.

== Military career ==
Upon graduation, Carpenter was commissioned as an infantry officer and went on to serve at least two tours in Vietnam. In 1964, he was an adviser assigned to an airborne brigade of the Army of the Republic of Vietnam. That unit came under heavy enemy fire immediately after being inserted by helicopter into a sugar cane field. Bill Carpenter was wounded by a gunshot through the arm while changing rifle magazines. His radio set was hit with another bullet and he was spun around and knocked to the ground. He proceeded to eliminate the source of the enemy fire, by knocking out a bunker with a hand grenade. For his actions he was awarded the Silver Star, the U.S. Army's third highest award for valor in combat.

In 1966, Captain Carpenter's C Company, 2/502nd Parachute Infantry of the 101st Airborne Division took part in Operation Hawthorne, fighting North Vietnamese forces near Dak To on the Kontum plateau in the Central Highlands. As it maneuvered in an attempt to relieve Major David Hackworth's engaged 1/327th Infantry, C Company became isolated and in danger of being overrun. As the situation grew desperate, Carpenter radioed the battalion air traffic controller for a napalm airstrike on his own position: "We're overrun, they're right in among us. I need an air strike on my position." Several of his soldiers were wounded by the close air support, but it blunted the enemy attack and prevented the envelopment of his company. C Company was then able to consolidate and eventually break out. For his actions, he was again awarded the Silver Star, which was later upgraded to the U.S. Army's second highest wartime medal, the Distinguished Service Cross and earned the nickname, "Napalm Bill" Carpenter.

Carpenter committed another act of heroism on February 1, 1967, at Tan Son Nhut Air Base in Saigon when he carried an injured man to safety after a plane crash landed. After a C-123 Provider military transport aircraft made a belly landing on the runway, Captain Carpenter "hoisted the injured man onto his shoulders and scampered from the gasoline-soaked plane."

In 1984, Carpenter went on to take command of the newly activated 10th Mountain Division and, finally, the Combined Field Army in Korea. He eventually retired as a lieutenant general and settled in Montana.

== See also ==
- List of people with surname Carpenter

== Additional sources ==
- Charles Goodman, Hell's Brigade, 1966, New York, Prestige, ASIN: B000UCG92Q.
