= Richie Lucas =

American football player (born 1938)

No. 11
- Position: Quarterback

Personal information
- Born: April 15, 1938 (age 88); Glassport, Pennsylvania, U.S.
- Listed height: 6 ft 0 in (1.83 m)
- Listed weight: 190 lb (86 kg)

Career information
- High school: Glassport
- College: Penn State (1957–1959)
- NFL draft: 1960: 1st round, 4th overall pick
- AFL draft: 1960: 1st round

Career history
- Buffalo Bills (1960–1961); Denver Broncos (1962)

Awards and highlights
- Maxwell Award (1959); Consensus All-American (1959); First-team All-Eastern (1959)

Career AFL statistics
- Passing attempts: 99
- Passing completions: 43
- Completion percentage: 43.4%
- TD–INT: 4–7
- Passing yards: 596
- Passer rating: 47.4
- Rushing yards: 153
- Rushing touchdowns: 2
- Stats at Pro Football Reference
- College Football Hall of Fame

Richard John Lucas (born April 15, 1938) is an American former professional football player who was a quarterback in the American Football League (AFL) for the Buffalo Bills and the Denver Broncos. He played college football for the Penn State Nittany Lions, winning the Maxwell Award in 1959. His coach Rip Engle described him as "the modern version of the old triple-threat player" because of his passing, running, and punting skills, in addition to his defensive prowess.

== Early life ==
Lucas was born in Glassport, Pennsylvania. At Glassport High School, he was a multi-sport athlete, competing in football, basketball, baseball, and volleyball. Lucas was most successful in football, receiving offers from Cincinnati, North Carolina State, Pitt, and Miami. He also garnered interest from Penn State after legendary coach Joe Paterno noticed his skill while scouting another quarterback. Ultimately, Lucas ended up accepting a scholarship to play at Penn State.

== College career ==
As a freshman, Lucas was ineligible to play football because at the time, all players had to sit out their freshman year.

=== 1957 season ===
In his sophomore season, Lucas opened as the second-string quarterback behind Al Jacks. After Jacks dislocated his shoulder during a game versus rival Syracuse, Lucas stepped in for the Nittany Lions. Shortly after, Lucas ran a play where he faked handing the ball to the fullback Babe Caprara, simultaneously fooling the cameraman into thinking Caprara had the ball, then rolled out to his right and threw a touchdown pass to Les Walters that sealed the game with a score of 20-12. From then on, Penn State relied on Lucas to make plays for the Nittany Lions. In 9 games, he completed 45.8% of his passes for 428 yards, 4 TDs and 4 INTs, as well as 66 yards and 1 TD rushing.

Nicknamed "Riverboat Richie" due to his gambling instincts when calling plays, Lucas won the Maxwell Award in 1959.

== Professional career ==
Lucas was a first round pick in both the 1960 NFL draft and the 1960 American Football League draft. Lucas signed with the Buffalo Bills of the newly-formed AFL, making him officially the franchise's first player. There he played quarterback, safety and return specialist for two seasons but was plagued by foot injuries. He was obtained by the Denver Broncos in the 1962 equalization draft for $1000. After trying him out at quarterback, defensive back and flanker he was released just before the first game of the 1962 season.

== After football ==
Lucas returned to Penn State following his pro football career, serving as assistant athletic director until 1998. He was inducted into the College Football Hall of Fame in 1986.

== See also ==
- List of American Football League players
