= Jerry Burch =

American football player (born 1939)

No. 86
- Position: Tight end

Personal information
- Born: December 13, 1939 (age 86)
- Listed height: 6 ft 1 in (1.85 m)
- Listed weight: 195 lb (88 kg)

Career information
- High school: McGill–Toolen (Mobile, Alabama)
- College: Georgia Tech
- NFL draft: 1961: 6th round, 71st overall pick
- AFL draft: 1961: 13th round, 99th overall pick

Career history
- Oakland Raiders (1961)

Awards and highlights
- 2× Second-team All-SEC (1959, 1960)

Career AFL statistics
- Receptions: 18
- Receiving yards: 235
- Touchdowns: 1
- Stats at Pro Football Reference

Gerald Thomas Burch (born December 13, 1939) is an American former professional football player who was a tight end with the Oakland Raiders of the American Football League (AFL). He played college football for the Georgia Tech Yellow Jackets. He was a 13th round pick by the Raiders in the 1961 AFL Draft.
