= Charlie Janerette =

American football player (1938–1984)

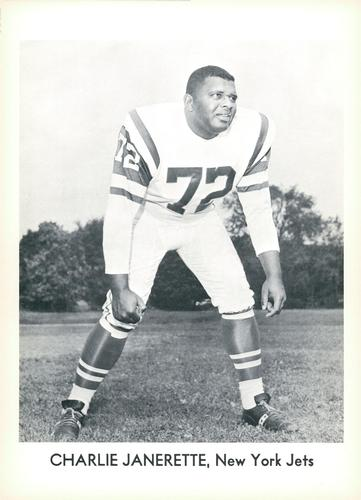

No. 67, 72, 70
- Positions: Offensive tackle, guard, defensive tackle

Personal information
- Born: December 1, 1938; Philadelphia, Pennsylvania, U.S.
- Died: October 26, 1984 (aged 45); Philadelphia, Pennsylvania, U.S.
- Listed height: 6 ft 3 in (1.91 m)
- Listed weight: 253 lb (115 kg)

Career information
- High school: Germantown (PA)
- College: Penn State
- NFL draft: 1960: 5th round, 49th overall pick

Career history

Playing
- Los Angeles Rams (1960); New York Giants (1961–1962); New York Jets (1963); Denver Broncos (1964–1965); Wilmington Clippers (1967); Harrisburg Capitols (1968)

Coaching
- Harrisburg Capitols (1968) Assistant coach

Awards and highlights
- Second-team All-Eastern (1959)

Career NFL/AFL statistics
- Fumble recoveries: 1
- Interceptions: 2
- Sacks: 9.5
- Stats at Pro Football Reference

Charles Fletcher Janerette Jr. (December 1, 1938 - October 26, 1984) was an American professional football defensive tackle. He played college football at Penn State and spent six seasons playing professional football with the Los Angeles Rams, New York Giants, New York Jets, and Denver Broncos. Janerette was killed in 1984 after being shot by a police officer.
