= Dan Lanphear =

American football player (1938–2018)

No. 73, 84
- Position: Defensive end

Personal information
- Born: January 24, 1938; Madison, Wisconsin, U.S.
- Died: March 23, 2018 (aged 80); Barrington, Illinois, U.S.
- Listed height: 6 ft 2 in (1.88 m)
- Listed weight: 230 lb (104 kg)

Career information
- High school: Madison (WI) West
- College: Wisconsin
- NFL draft: 1960: 8th round, 90th overall pick

Career history
- Houston Oilers (1960, 1962)

Awards and highlights
- AFL champion (1960); Unanimous All-American (1959); First-team All-Big Ten (1959); Second-team All-Big Ten (1958)

Career AFL statistics
- Sacks: 2
- Stats at Pro Football Reference

George Daniel Lanphear (January 24, 1938 – March 23, 2018) was an American football player. He was born in Madison, Wisconsin, and played college football for the University of Wisconsin–Madison. He was a member of the 1959 Wisconsin Badgers football team that lost to the Washington Huskies in the 1960 Rose Bowl. He later played in the American Football League (AFL) for the Houston Oilers in 1960 and 1962 as a defensive end. Lanphear was also drafted 90th overall in the eighth round of the 1960 NFL draft by the Pittsburgh Steelers. He played 14 games for the Oilers in 1960, winning an AFL title with the team. He played two games in the 1962 season. Lanphear died in 2018 at the age of 80.
