= Dawmont, West Virginia =

Unincorporated community in West Virginia, United States

- Unincorporated community
- Location within West Virginia Location within the United States
- Coordinates: 39°19′03″N 80°20′32″W
- Country: United States
- State: West Virginia
- County: Harrison
- Elevation: 1,040 ft (320 m)
- Time zone: UTC-5 (Eastern (EST))
  - Summer (DST): UTC-4 (EDT)
- Area codes: 304 & 681
- GNIS feature ID: 1554267

Dawmont is an unincorporated community in Harrison County, West Virginia, United States. Dawmont is 2.5 miles (4.0 km) north of Clarksburg. Former National Football League player and University of Pittsburgh football coach Foge Fazio was born in Dawmont.

The community's name is an amalgamation of Dawson Coleman and Rosemont, the former the proprietor of the Rosemont coal mine.
