= Pat Dye =

American football coach, player and sports administrator (1939–2020)

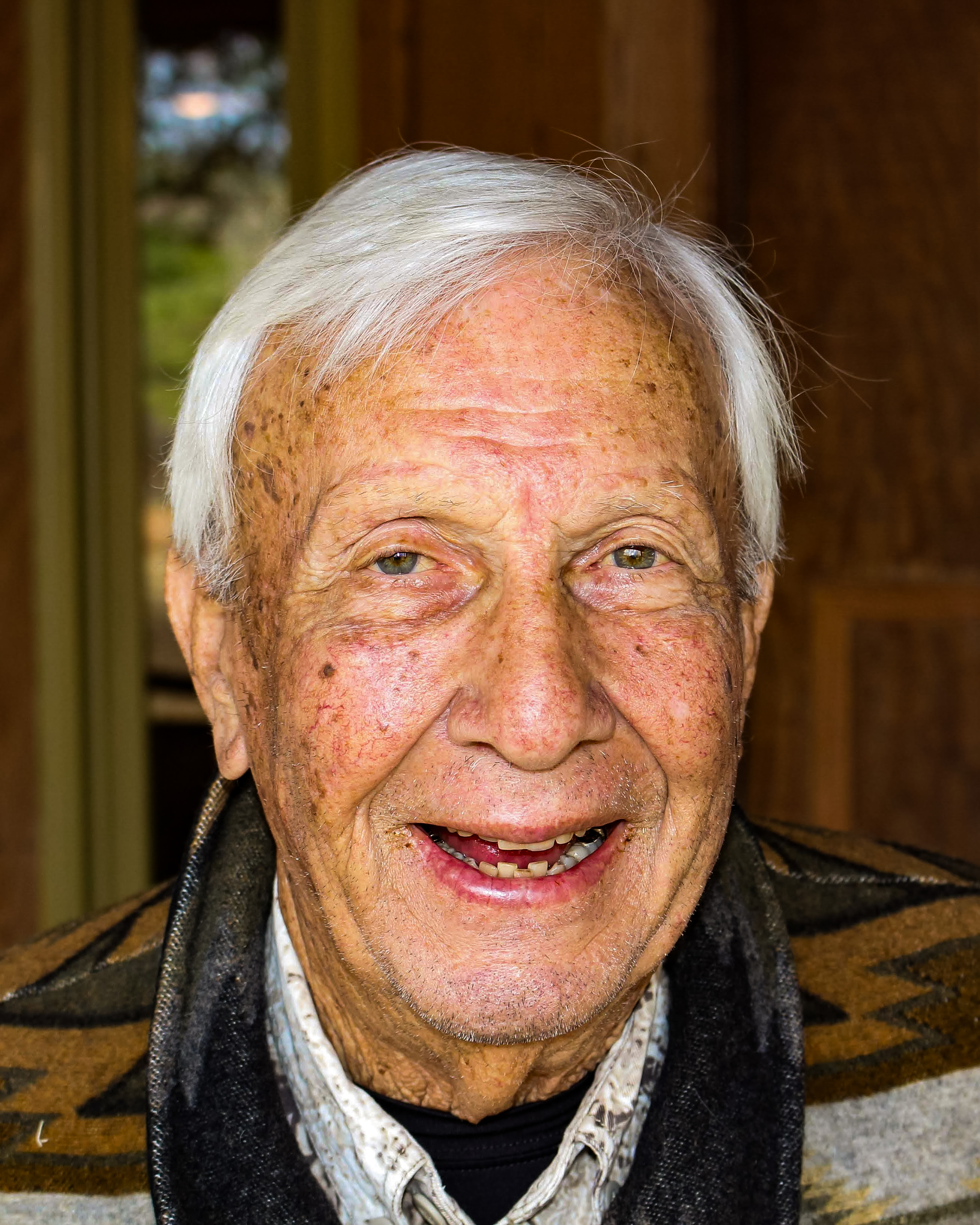
- Dye at Crooked Oaks Farm in 2018

Biographical details
- Born: November 6, 1939; Blythe, Georgia, U.S.
- Died: June 1, 2020 (aged 80); Auburn, Alabama, U.S.

Playing career
- 1958–1960: Georgia
- 1961–1962: Edmonton Eskimos
- Positions: Offensive guard, linebacker

Coaching career (HC unless noted)
- 1965–1973: Alabama (LB)
- 1974–1979: East Carolina
- 1980: Wyoming
- 1981–1992: Auburn

Administrative career (AD unless noted)
- 1981–1991: Auburn

Head coaching record
- Overall: 153–62–5
- Bowls: 7–2–1

Accomplishments and honors

Championships
- SoCon champion (1976); Division I-A national champion (1983); 4x SEC champion (1983, 1987, 1988, 1989)

Awards
- First-team All-American (1959); Second-team All-American (1960); First-team All-SEC (1960); Second-team All-SEC (1959); 3× SEC Coach of the Year (1983, 1987, 1988)
- College Football Hall of Fame; Inducted in 2005 (profile)

Patrick Fain Dye (November 6, 1939 – June 1, 2020) was an American football player, coach, and college athletics administrator. He served as the head football coach at East Carolina University (1974–1979), the University of Wyoming (1980), and Auburn University (1981–1992) compiling a career college football record of 153–62–5. While the head coach at Auburn, he led the team to four Southeastern Conference (SEC) championships and was named the SEC Coach of the Year three times. He served as the athletic director at Auburn from 1981 to 1991 and was inducted into the College Football Hall of Fame as a coach in 2005. On November 19, 2005, the playing field at Auburn's Jordan-Hare Stadium was named "Pat Dye Field" in his honor.

== Playing career ==
Dye played high school football from 1954 to 1956 at Richmond Academy in Augusta, Georgia, where he was selected All-American and All-State while leading the team to the 1956 3A state championship, serving as team captain. He placed second in the state tournament in shot-put and javelin, on the state championship track team. Following this success, The Atlanta Journal-Constitution selected Dye as Georgia's 3A Lineman of the Year for 1956 before being recruited to the University of Georgia where he followed his older brothers, Wayne and Nat. His younger sister, Jayne Dye Snell, also attended the University of Georgia.

While playing for the Bulldogs from 1957 to 1960 under head coach Wally Butts, Dye was a first-team All-SEC lineman and two-time All-American (1959 and 1960). He was a two-way starter at offensive guard and linebacker, SEC Lineman of the Year in 1960, team co-captain in 1960, won the William K. Jenkins Award for the Most Valuable Lineman (1959, 1960), and the JB Whitworth Award for the Outstanding Georgia Lineman 1960. He helped lead the team to the SEC Championship and the Orange Bowl in 1959, undefeated as a player against Georgia Tech. He played in 3 All-Star games: the Blue Gray Classic, Senior Bowl, and Coaches All-American Game in 1960. The Atlanta Touchdown Club named him the SEC's Most Valuable Lineman in 1960 where he served as co-captain with friend and NFL Hall of Famer Fran Tarkenton.

Dye was selected in the 2nd round of the 1960 AFL Draft by the Boston Patriots, which took place in late 1959 while he was still playing at Georgia. He was selected again in the 24th round (190th overall) of the 1961 AFL Draft by the Dallas Texans, but he opted not to sign with either team and instead chose to play in the Canadian Football League.

Upon graduation from Georgia, Dye played three years of professional football as a two-way starter at tight end and linebacker for the Edmonton Eskimos in the Canadian Football League. He then served from 1963-1964 in the US Army to fulfill an ROTC obligation where he played for the Ft. Benning 'Doughboys'. While playing there he received the Timmy Award for Armed Services Most Valuable Player in 1964.

== Coaching career ==
=== Alabama ===
Dye's first coaching job came as an assistant head coach at the University of Alabama in 1965, under Bear Bryant. Dye served as a defensive assistant at Alabama through the 1973 season.

Pat Dye is credited with breaking the recruiting color barrier at Alabama. He personally recruited both Wilbur Jackson and John Mitchell, the first Black players on the Crimson Tide football team. In 1970, Jackson became the first Black athlete to sign a football scholarship with Alabama. In 1971, Mitchell transferred to Alabama and became the first Black player to take the field for the Crimson Tide. Jackson followed later that season, becoming the second, as NCAA rules had previously barred freshmen from varsity play. Mitchell also became the first Black co-captain and the first Black All-American at Alabama.

Dye’s efforts were pivotal in integrating Alabama’s football program, marking a significant moment in the school’s history and in the broader context of college football in the South.

=== East Carolina ===
Dye moved into his first head coaching job at East Carolina University in 1974. Over six seasons, he achieved a record of 48–18–1. He guided the Pirates to the Southern Conference championship in 1976 and posted at least seven wins in all six seasons in Greenville. In 2006, Dye was inducted into the East Carolina Athletics Hall of Fame. As of 2006, his 72.4% win rate is the second highest of any coach in East Carolina University history.

=== Wyoming ===
In 1980, Dye took over for one season as head coach at the University of Wyoming. In the decade prior to his arrival, the Cowboys had had only one winning season (winning 35% of their games). In Dye's first year, he changed the culture into a winning program going 6–5 and paving the way for future success under coaches Al Kincaid (Dye's offensive coordinator) and Dennis Erickson. In an interview many years later, Dye revealed that the athletic administration at Wyoming failed to have him sign his contract when they hired him. Consequently, when Auburn hired Dye to be their new head coach, Wyoming had no recourse to demand compensation for Auburn hiring him away.

=== Auburn ===
During Dye's interview for the head coaching job at Auburn, he was asked by a member of the search committee, "How long will it take you to beat Alabama?" Dye's reply was "60 minutes," although it took him 120 minutes. At Auburn, Dye achieved a record of 99–39–4 (71.1% win rate) over 12 seasons. His 99 wins are behind only Mike Donahue and Ralph Jordan for the most in school history. Under Dye's leadership, the Tigers won four Southeastern Conference championships (1983, 1987, 1988, 1989) and Dye became the fourth coach in SEC history to win three straight (1987, 1988, 1989). He received SEC Coach of the Year honors in 1983, 1987 and 1988. Dye was also Auburn's athletic director from 1981 to 1991, a perk Ralph "Shug" Jordan did not enjoy during his 25-year tenure (1951–75), which saw the stadium named in his honor.

Dye coached 1985 Heisman Trophy winner Bo Jackson, as well as Tracy Rocker, winner of both the Outland Trophy and the Lombardi Award in 1988. The 1983 team, led by quarterback Randy Campbell and a stifling defense, is generally considered Dye's best. They bounced back from an early season loss to Texas to win 10 consecutive games, including five over bowl teams. Auburn was ranked #1 in the nation by the New York Times at the end of the 1983 season but ended up #3 in the AP and UPI polls, behind Miami and Nebraska.

Dye's tenure on the Plains ended due to an NCAA investigation involving a member of the team. The NCAA found that Dye was not personally responsible for rules violations, but that he should have known about and prevented them. The fallout from the investigation eventually led Dye to step down as Athletic Director in 1991, and as head coach the following year.

On November 19, 2005, the playing surface at Jordan–Hare Stadium at Auburn was named Pat Dye Field in the former coach's honor. The dedication ceremony was held immediately before the Iron Bowl, which Auburn went on to win 28–18. This was especially appropriate since Dye led the Tigers to a 30–20 victory over the Tide on December 2, 1989, in the first installment of the Iron Bowl, to be played at Auburn after 41 consecutive meetings at Legion Field in Birmingham.

The permanent move of Auburn's home games against Alabama to Jordan–Hare Stadium is considered one of Dye's most important achievements as AU's Athletic Director. When Dye came to Auburn, he was well aware of the growing sentiment among Auburn fans to have the game played on the Plains in odd-numbered years. He recalled years later that at his first meeting with Bryant after becoming Auburn's head coach and athletic director, his former mentor almost immediately mused, "Well, I guess you'll want to take that game to Auburn." Dye replied without hesitation, "We're going to take it to Auburn." When Bryant reminded Dye that "we've got a contract (with Birmingham) through '88," Dye retorted, "Well, we'll play '89 in Auburn." Dye could have theoretically moved Auburn's home games for the Iron Bowl to Jordan-Hare as early as 1983. However, he was well aware that Bryant vehemently opposed moving the Iron Bowl out of Birmingham, let alone playing in Auburn. Dye also knew Bryant's stature in the state was such that it would be folly to even consider such a move as long as Bryant was atill alive.

Dye's tenure was also notable for the November 27, 1982 victory over arch-rival Alabama, when Dye's team defeated Alabama 23–22 in Bryant's last regular-season game. That game snapped a 9-game Tide winning streak and reignited the rivalry.

== Writing ==
Dye's autobiography, In The Arena, written with John Logue, was published in 1992. In September 2006, Dye partnered with publisher Mascot Books to release his first children's book, War Eagle! Dye's third book, After The Arena, published in 2013, details his life after leaving coaching in 1992.

== Life after coaching ==
During the latter part of his life, Dye spent most of his time on his farm in Notasulga, Alabama, where he was involved in the day-to-day activities of his two businesses: Crooked Oaks Hunting Preserve and Quail Hollow Gardens Japanese Maple Farm & Nursery. Many activities on his farm are made available to the public, including horse boarding and trail rides, quail hunts, and garden tours. Dye's family includes 4 children and 9 grandchildren.

In 2005, Dye was inducted into the College Football Hall of Fame. In 2014, he was inducted into the Georgia-Florida Hall of Fame.

From 2013 until 2020, Dye hosted "The Coach Pat Dye Show" with co-host Tim Ellen and producer Lynn Huggins. The show was a weekly sports interview and opinion program that aired on radio stations around the southeast, online and on tune-in radio.

== Death ==
On May 21, 2020, Dye was hospitalized in Atlanta for kidney-related problems. He was also diagnosed with COVID-19 but was asymptomatic. He died at a hospice care facility in Auburn on June 1, 2020, from kidney and liver failure complications.

== Head coaching record ==
| Year | Team | Overall | Conference | Standing | Bowl/playoffs | Coaches^{#} | AP^{°} |
|---|---|---|---|---|---|---|---|
East Carolina Pirates (Southern Conference) (1974–1976)
| 1974 | East Carolina | 7–4 | 3–3 | T–3rd | | | |
| 1975 | East Carolina | 8–3 | 4–2 | 2nd | | | |
| 1976 | East Carolina | 9–2 | 4–1 | 1st | | | |
East Carolina Pirates (NCAA Division I / I-A independent) (1977–1979)
| 1977 | East Carolina | 8–3 | | | | | |
| 1978 | East Carolina | 9–3 | | | W Independence | | |
| 1979 | East Carolina | 7–3–1 | | | | | |
| East Carolina: | | 48–18–1 | 11–6 | | | | |
Wyoming Cowboys (Western Athletic Conference) (1980)
| 1980 | Wyoming | 6–5 | 4–4 | T–5th | | | |
| Wyoming: | | 6–5 | 4–4 | | | | |
Auburn Tigers (Southeastern Conference) (1981–1992)
| 1981 | Auburn | 5–6 | 2–4 | T–6th | | | |
| 1982 | Auburn | 9–3 | 4–2 | T–3rd | W Tangerine | 14 | 14 |
| 1983 | Auburn | 11–1 | 6–0 | 1st | W Sugar | 3 | 3 |
| 1984 | Auburn | 9–4 | 4–2 | T–3rd | W Liberty | 14 | 14 |
| 1985 | Auburn | 8–4 | 3–3 | 5th | L Cotton | | |
| 1986 | Auburn | 10–2 | 4–2 | T–2nd | W Florida Citrus | 8 | 6 |
| 1987 | Auburn | 9–1–2 | 5–0–1 | 1st | T Sugar | 7 | 7 |
| 1988 | Auburn | 10–2 | 6–1 | T–1st | L Sugar | 7 | 8 |
| 1989 | Auburn | 10–2 | 6–1 | T–1st | W Hall of Fame | 6 | 6 |
| 1990 | Auburn | 8–3–1 | 4–2–1 | 4th | W Peach | 19 | 19 |
| 1991 | Auburn | 5–6 | 2–5 | 8th | | | |
| 1992 | Auburn | 5–5–1 | 2–5–1 | 5th (West) | | | |
| Auburn: | | 99–39–4 | 48–27–3 | | | | |
| Total: | | 153–62–5 | | | | | |
National championship Conference title Conference division title or championship game berth
^{#}Rankings from final Coaches Poll.; ^{°}Rankings from final AP Poll.

== See also ==
- Legends Poll
