= 1960 All-America college football team =

Official list of the best college football players of 1960

The 1960 All-America college football team is composed of college football players who were selected as All-Americans by various organizations and writers that chose All-America college football teams in 1960. The six selectors recognized by the NCAA as "official" for the 1960 season are (1) the American Football Coaches Association (AFCA), (2) the Associated Press (AP), (3) the Football Writers Association of America (FWAA), (4) the Newspaper Enterprise Association (NEA), (5) the Sporting News, and (6) the United Press International (UPI).

Seven players, including 1960 Heisman Trophy winner Joe Bellino of Navy, and College and Pro Football Hall of Fame inductees Mike Ditka of Pitt and Bob Lilly of TCU, were unanimously named first-team All-Americans by all six official selectors.

== Consensus All-Americans ==
For the year 1960, the NCAA recognizes six published All-American teams as "official" designations for purposes of its consensus determinations. The following chart identifies the NCAA-recognized consensus All-Americans and displays which first-team designations they received.

Name	Position	School	Number	Official	Other
Mike Ditka	End	Pittsburgh	6/6	AFCA, AP, FWAA, NEA, SN, UPI	CP, Time, WC
Dan LaRose	End	Missouri	6/6	AFCA, AP, FWAA, NEA, SN, UPI	CP, Time, WC
Bob Lilly	Tackle	TCU	6/6	AFCA, AP, FWAA, NEA, SN, UPI	CP, Time, WC
Tom Brown	Guard	Minnesota	6/6	AFCA, AP, FWAA, NEA, SN, UPI	CP, Time, WC
Joe Bellino	Halfback	Navy	6/6	AFCA, AP, FWAA, NEA, SN, UPI	CP, Time, WC
Bob Ferguson	Fullback	Ohio State	6/6	AFCA, AP, FWAA, NEA, SN, UPI	CP, Time, WC
Jake Gibbs	Quarterback	Ole Miss	6/6	AFCA, AP, FWAA, NEA, SN, UPI	CP, WC
Ken Rice	Tackle	Auburn	5/6	AFCA, AP, FWAA, SN, UPI	CP, Time, WC
E. J. Holub	Center	Texas Tech	5/6	AFCA, FWAA, NEA, SN, UPI	CP, Time, WC
Joe Romig	Guard	Colorado	3/6	AFCA, FWAA, UPI	WC
Ernie Davis	Halfback	Syracuse	2/6	AFCA, UPI	WC

== All-American selections for 1960 ==
=== Ends ===
- Mike Ditka, Pittsburgh (AP-1, UPI-1, NEA, CP, WC, AFCA-1, FWAA, SN, Time)
- Dan LaRose, Missouri (AP-1, UPI-1, NEA, CP, WC, AFCA-1, FWAA, SN, Time)
- Bill Miller, Miami (FL) (FWAA)
- Claude Moorman, Duke (AFCA-2, FWAA, UPI-2)
- Marlin McKeever, USC (AFCA-2, UPI-2)
- Johnny Brewer, Ole Miss (AFCA-3, UPI-3)
- Fred Mautino, Syracuse (AFCA-3, UPI-3)

=== Tackles ===
- Bob Lilly, TCU (AP-1, UPI-1, NEA, CP, WC, AFCA-1, FWAA, SN, Time)
- Ken Rice, Auburn (AP-1, UPI-1, CP, WC, AFCA-1, FWAA, SN, Time)
- Merlin Olsen, Utah State (AFCA-3, NEA, FWAA, UPI-3)
- Jerry Beabout, Purdue (AFCA-2, FWAA, UPI-2)
- Kurt Gegner, Washington (AFCA-2, UPI-2)
- Bob DeMarco, Dayton (AFCA-3)
- Joe Rutgens, Illinois (UPI-3)

=== Guards ===
- Tom Brown, Minnesota (AP-1, UPI-1, NEA, CP, WC, AFCA-1, FWAA, SN, Time)
- Joe Romig, Colorado (UPI-1, WC, AFCA-1, FWAA)
- Mark Manders, Iowa (AFCA-2, FWAA, SN, UPI-3)
- Ben Balme, Yale (AP-1)
- Wayne Harris, Arkansas (FWAA)
- Al Vanderbush, Army (AFCA-3, UPI-2, CP)
- Myron Pottios, Notre Dame (Time)
- Pat Dye, Georgia (AFCA-2, UPI-2)
- Rufus King, Rice (AFCA-3)
- Monte Lee, Texas (UPI-3)

=== Centers ===
- E. J. Holub, Texas Tech(UPI-1, NEA, CP, WC, AFCA-1, FWAA, SN, Time)
- Roy McKasson, Washington (AP-1, NEA, FWAA, UPI-3)
- Tom Goode, Mississippi State (AFCA-2)
- Wayne Harris, Arkansas (AFCA-3, UPI-2)

=== Quarterbacks ===
- Jake Gibbs, Mississippi (AP-1, UPI-1, NEA, CP, WC, AFCA-1, FWAA, SN)
- Roman Gabriel, N.C. State (AFCA-2, FWAA, UPI-2)
- Norm Snead, Wake Forest (Time)
- Tom Matte, Ohio State (AFCA-3, UPI-3)

=== Halfbacks ===
- Joe Bellino, Navy (AP-1, UPI-1, NEA, CP, WC, AFCA-1, FWAA, SN, Time)
- Ernie Davis, Syracuse (UPI-1, WC, AFCA-1)
- Billy Kilmer, UCLA (AFCA-2, CP, FWAA, SN, UPI-2)
- Pervis Atkins, New Mexico State (AP-1, NEA, UPI-3)
- John Hadl, Kansas (FWAA)
- Larry Ferguson, Iowa (FWAA)
- Tommy Mason, Tulane (AFCA-3, Time, UPI-3)
- Ronnie Bull, Baylor (AFCA-2, UPI-2)
- Lance Alworth, Arkansas (AFCA-3)
- Wilburn Hollis, Iowa (UPI-3)

=== Fullbacks ===
- Bob Ferguson, Ohio State (AP-1, UPI-1, NEA, CP, WC, AFCA-1, FWAA, SN, Time)
- Ed Dyas, Auburn (FWAA, UPI-2)
- Tom Watkins, Iowa State (AFCA-2)
- Mike Stock, Northwestern (AFCA-3)

== Key ==
- **Bold** – Consensus All-American
- -1 – First-team selection
- -2 – Second-team selection
- -3 – Third-team selection

=== Official selectors ===
- AFCA = American Football Coaches Association, "selected on the basis of balloting by more than 1,500 members of the coaches' association", sponsored by Eastman Kodak Company and distributed exclusively by the United Press International
- AP = Associated Press
- FWAA = Football Writers Association of America
- NEA = Newspaper Enterprise Association
- TSN = Sporting News
- UPI = United Press International. "Chosen by the ballots of a record number of 402 sports writers and broadcasters from all parts of the nation ..."

=== Other selectors ===
- CP = Central Press Association
- Time = Time magazine
- WC = Walter Camp Football Foundation

== See also ==
- 1960 All-Atlantic Coast Conference football team
- 1960 All-Big Eight Conference football team
- 1960 All-Big Ten Conference football team
- 1960 All-Pacific Coast football team
- 1960 All-SEC football team
- 1960 All-Southwest Conference football team
