= Bruce Tarbox =

American football player (1939–1979)

No. 61, 78
- Position: Guard

Personal information
- Born: May 10, 1939; Nyack, New York, U.S.
- Died: March 6, 1979 (aged 39); Pittsburgh, Pennsylvania, U.S.
- Listed height: 6 ft 2 in (1.88 m)
- Listed weight: 230 lb (104 kg)

Career information
- High school: Kent School (CT)
- College: Syracuse
- NFL draft: 1961: 2nd round, 25th overall pick

Career history
- Los Angeles Rams (1961); New York Jets (1963)*; Mohawk Valley Falcons (1963-1964); Scranton Miners (1966)
- * Offseason or practice squad member only

Awards and highlights
- Third-team All-Eastern (1959)

Career NFL statistics
- Games played: 7
- Stats at Pro Football Reference

Bruce B. Tarbox (May 10, 1939 – March 6, 1979) was an American football guard. He was drafted by the New York Giants in the 2nd round (25th overall) of the 1961 NFL Draft. He played for the Los Angeles Rams in 1961. In 1979, Tarbox died of a heart attack while playing tennis.
