= Gerhard Schwedes =

German-American gridiron football player (1938–2026)

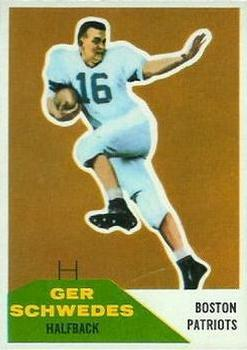
- 1960 Fleer trading card

No. 30, 34, 44
- Position: Halfback

Personal information
- Born: April 23, 1938; Freiburg im Breisgau, Gau Baden, Germany
- Died: August 23, 2026 (aged 88); Fayetteville, New York, U.S.
- Listed height: 6 ft 1 in (1.85 m)
- Listed weight: 205 lb (93 kg)

Career information
- High school: Hunterdon Central Regional (Flemington, New Jersey, U.S.)
- College: Syracuse (1956–1959)
- NFL draft: 1960: 4th round, 47th overall pick
- AFL draft: 1960: 1st round

Career history
- New York Titans (1960); Boston Patriots (1960–1961)

Awards and highlights
- National champion (1959); Third-team All-American (1959); First-team All-Eastern (1959); Third-team All-Eastern (1958)

Career AFL statistics
- Rushing yards: 14
- Rushing average: 1.4
- Receptions: 1
- Receiving yards: 21
- Stats at Pro Football Reference

Gerhard H. Schwedes (April 23, 1938 – August 23, 2026) was a German-American professional football player who was a halfback for two seasons in the American Football League (AFL) with the Boston Patriots and New York Titans. He was born in Nazi Germany and grew up there during World War II. He moved to the United States when he was 12. He played college football for the Syracuse Orangemen, whom he helped to a victory in the 1960 Cotton Bowl Classic. In late November 1959, Schwedes was selected by the Patriots in the territorial portion of the AFL's inaugural 1960 draft, becoming the first draft pick in Patriots franchise history.

== Early life ==
Gerhard H. Schwedes was born in Freiburg im Breisgau, Nazi Germany, on April 23, 1938. His father was a German Army officer and spent part of World War II in a prison camp in Russia. Schwedes was raised in Ulm. About once a month during the war, he and his family took shelter in the home's cellar after hearing air raid warnings over the radio. In one instance, his friend's house across the street was destroyed by a bomb, killing the entire family. Another friend of his lost a leg due to a land mine. Schwedes did not have any shoes during the war and food was very scarce. In 1948, several years after the war, his father finally returned home. The family moved to the United States when Schwedes was 12 years old. His father later worked as a painter at a chemical plant in New Jersey and his mother worked at a grocery store. Schwedes played high school football at Hunterdon Central Regional High School in Flemington, New Jersey.

== College career ==
Schwedes was a member of the Orangemen of Syracuse University from 1956 to 1959 and a three-year letterman from 1957 to 1959. He rushed 45 times for 195 yards, caught three passes for 13 yards, and attempted one pass for a 28-yard touchdown in 1957. In 1958, he recorded 83 carries for 360 yards and three touchdowns, and 13 receptions for 117 yards, earning Associated Press (AP) third-team All-Eastern honors. He was a team captain his senior year in 1959, totaling 90 rushing attempts for 567 yards, 15 catches for 231 yards and five touchdowns, and 9 completions on 17 passing attempts for 93 yards, two touchdowns, and two interceptions. Schwedes threw for one touchdown and ran for another in the 1960 Cotton Bowl Classic, helping No. 1 ranked Syracuse beat No. 4 ranked Texas. The Orange were named consensus national champions that season. For his performance during the 1959 season, Schwedes was named first-team All-Eastern by the AP and United Press International (UPI), and a third-team All-American by UPI and a second-team All-American by the Central Press Association. He was also an NFF National Scholar-Athlete in 1959. Schwedes lettered in lacrosse at Syracuse as well.

== Professional career ==
In late November 1959, Schwedes was selected by the Boston Patriots of the American Football League (AFL) in the territorial portion of the AFL's inaugural 1960 draft, becoming the first draft pick in Patriots franchise history. (Note: The first round of the 1960 AFL draft was territorial selections. Teams were allowed to select a single player from a designated region (their "territory").) He was also selected by the Baltimore Colts of the National Football League (NFL) in the fourth round, with the 47th overall pick, of the 1960 NFL draft. He signed with the Patriots on January 1, 1960.

On August 31, 1960, Schwedes was traded to the New York Titans for Marshall Harris and a 1961 seventh round draft pick. Schwedes appeared in three games for the Titans during the team's inaugural 1960 season before being released.

Schwedes then re-signed with the Patriots on September 28, 1960. He played in two games for the Patriots before being released on October 18, 1960. He was signed by the Patriots again in 1961. Schwedes played in five games for the Patriots during the 1961 season, rushing ten times for 14 yards and catching one pass for 21 yards. He was released for the final time in 1961.

== Personal life ==
Schwedes' son Scott Schwedes also played football at Syracuse and later in the NFL. Gerhard was inducted into the Greater Syracuse Sports Hall of Fame in 2014.

Schwedes was fluent in English, German, Italian, and French. He died at his home in Fayetteville, New York, on August 23, 2026, at the age of 88.
