= E. J. Holub =

American football player (1938–2019)

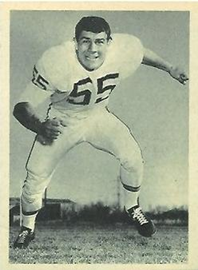
- Holub in 1961

No. 55
- Positions: Linebacker, center

Personal information
- Born: January 5, 1938; Schulenburg, Texas, U.S.
- Died: September 21, 2019 (aged 81)
- Listed height: 6 ft 4 in (1.93 m)
- Listed weight: 236 lb (107 kg)

Career information
- High school: Lubbock (TX)
- College: Texas Tech
- NFL draft: 1961: 2nd round, 16th overall pick
- AFL draft: 1961: 1st round, 6th overall pick

Career history
- Dallas Texans/Kansas City Chiefs (1961-1970)

Awards and highlights
- Super Bowl champion (IV); 3× AFL champion (1962, 1966, 1969); 5× AFL All-Star (1961, 1962, 1964–1966); 2× First-team All-AFL (1962, 1963); 5× Second-team All-AFL (1961, 1964–1966, 1969); Kansas City Chiefs Hall of Honor; Consensus All-American (1960); First-team All-American (1959); 2× First-team All-SWC (1959, 1960); Texas Tech Red Raiders No. 55 retired

Career NFL/AFL statistics
- Interceptions: 9
- Interception yards: 76
- Sacks: 17
- Stats at Pro Football Reference
- College Football Hall of Fame

Emil Joseph Holub (January 5, 1938 – September 21, 2019) was an American professional football center and linebacker in the American Football League (AFL) and the National Football League (NFL) for the Dallas Texans/Kansas City Chiefs. He played college football at Texas Technological College (now Texas Tech University).

== Early life ==
Holub was born on January 5, 1938, in Schulenburg, Texas. He graduated from Lubbock High School in 1957, where his nickname was "the Beast". He lettered in football (playing tackle), and track and field, participating in the power sports of shot put and discus as well as anchoring the sprint relay team.

He received All-District honors as a junior, and was named captain as a senior. A knee operation forced him to miss his senior season. The surgery took place over the summer of 1956, and he tried playing in an early season September game, where his knee was re-injured. He stopped playing altogether that year on medical advice.

In 1987, he was inducted into the Texas High School Football Hall of Fame. In 2011, he was inducted into the Lubbock Independent School District Athletics Hall of Honor.

== College ==
He accepted a football scholarship from Texas Technological College (Texas Tech), where he was a two-way player and still nicknamed "The Beast" by his teammates. He played under coach DeWitt Weaver. He stood 6 ft 4 in (1.93 m) and weighed 215 pounds (97.5 kg). He was shifted to center as a freshman, and played both offense (center) and defense (middle linebacker).

In his very first varsity game in 1958, he blocked a field attempt to win the game over Texas A&M. As a senior he had 15 unassisted tackles and 8 assisted tackles against Baylor. Sports Illustrated named him Lineman of the Week for that game. He had 18 unassisted tackles, 10 assisted tackles and returned an interception for a 40-yard touchdown against Arkansas. In the Red Raiders' game against Tulane, he had a 28-yard touchdown return on an interception.

=== College honors ===
He also became a two-time first team All-American at center in 1959 and 1960 (a consensus All-American in 1960); the first Red Raider to receive All-American honors twice. After his last game, the city of Lubbock celebrated "E.J. Holub Day". In 1960, he was selected to the All-Southwest Conference Team (the first Texas Tech player so honored), was 10th in Heisman Trophy voting, and played in the East-West Shrine Game, where he was named outstanding lineman. He also played in the Coaches All-America Game and the Chicago All-Star Game.

He was the first player in Texas Tech football history to have his jersey number (55) retired, which occurred after his senior season. In 1977, he was inducted into the Texas Tech Hall of Fame. In 1982, he was inducted into the Texas Sports Hall of Fame. In 1986, he was inducted into the National Football Foundation College Football Hall of Fame in South Bend, Indiana; the first Texas Tech player ever inducted.

In 2008, he was selected as a Texas Tech's Big 12 Legend. In 2012, he was inducted into the inaugural class of the Texas Tech Football Ring of Honor. In 2013, he was inducted into the Southwest Conference Hall of Fame.

== Professional career ==
Holub was selected by the Dallas Texans in the first round (6th overall) of the 1961 AFL draft and by the Dallas Cowboys in the second round (16th overall) of the 1961 NFL draft. On January 17, 1961, he signed with the Texans. In September 1961, Sports Illustrated referred to Holub as probably the AFL's top draftee. He principally played linebacker from 1961 to 1967, and then center from 1968 to 1970. He played as a Dallas Texan in 1961 and 1962, and then as a Kansas City Chief from 1963 to 1970 after the team moved.

Holub was on three AFL championship teams (Dallas 1962, Kansas City 1966, 1969), including the 1962 AFL title game with the Texans winning 20–17 in double-overtime against the defending champion Houston Oilers. This is the longest professional football league championship game ever played, was watched by millions on television, and played an important part in creating the grounds for an AFL-NFL merger.

Holub began his professional career as a two-way player, playing center on offense and linebacker on defense — a rarity during the two platoon era. Holub had begun professional play one year before Chuck Bednarik retired in 1962, who was the last full-time two-way player in the National Football League. In one game in 1962, Holub played 58 of 60 minutes, alternating on offense and defense; in another he racked up a total of 56 minutes played.

As a rookie he became a starter at left outside linebacker. In 1964, he played in only 9 games after he needed to have surgery on both of his knees. In 1965, he was moved to right outside linebacker. In 1967, he played in only 6 games after being placed on the injured reserve list on November 2, with an injury that was reported as a pulled leg muscle.

In the early years he played both at linebacker and long snapper (on extra points or field goals) until his knee injuries and a torn hamstring forced him to switch to center in 1968, replacing the recently retired Jon Gilliam. Holub was simply not able to run with the necessary speed to play linebacker after repeated surgeries. In Super Bowl IV, he became the only player to start on offense and defense in more than one Super Bowl.

Even after eleven knee surgeries (six on the left and five on the right) as a player, Holub was a leader, a "holler guy", and he was a team player, enduring pain to lead his team. He would spend hours in the training room, watching blood and liquid drain from his knee, then go out to the field and perform as though he was suffering from no physical problem.

Surgeries were more invasive in Holub's time, than for later football players. Facing a tenth operation on his legs (ninth on his knees) and the possibility of never playing football again, The New York Times said in 1971 that "Holub perhaps suffered more than any other athlete just to play the game." He had 20 surgeries in his lifetime, 11 during his playing days. His scarred knees have been described as belonging to "the annals of athletic injury", along with the likes of Joe Namath, Willis Reed, Bobby Orr and Gale Sayers.

== End of career ==
With his knees wearing out, the Chiefs selected his eventual successor, Jack Rudnay, in the 1969 NFL/AFL draft. Rudnay took over the starting center position during the 1970 season, with Holub playing in all 14 games as a long snapper and starting in only 6 games at center. In 1971, he injured his left knee in the first week of training camp and later announced his retirement.

== Legacy and honors ==
He was an American Football League All-Star in 1961, 1962, 1964, 1965 and 1966 as a linebacker. He was named first-team All-AFL at outside linebacker in 1962 and 1963. He was second-team All-AFL in 1961, 1965-1966, and 1969 (at center). Holub was the only player to start two Super Bowls at two different positions. He started Super Bowl I at linebacker, then started Super Bowl IV at center and was a driving force in helping the Chiefs defeat the Minnesota Vikings 23–7. He is pictured snapping the ball to quarterback Len Dawson on the cover of the January 14, 1970 edition of Sports Illustrated, published following the game, entitled "Len Dawson Engineers Superchief Upset".

In 1976, he was inducted into the Kansas City Chiefs Hall of Honor, as a center and linebacker.

== Personal life ==
Off the football field, Holub was known for his thoughtfulness, generosity, and kindness towards others. He had a lifelong interest in horses and the life of cowboys. He took his first horse, named "Cowboy", with him when the Dallas Texans moved to Kansas City. He once rode Cowboy, who lived to be 30, into Mike Ditka's Dallas sports bar. During the football off-seasons, he managed a ranch in Oklahoma.

After retiring, Holub was a rancher, and later became an advocate for Texas Tech by working for the Red Raider Club to raise scholarship funds. He is famous at Texas Tech for his rousing halftime speech to the Red Raiders in their final 1999 game, and the final game of coach Spike Dykes, that inspired the team to victory over Oklahoma.

== Death ==
On September 21, 2019, Holub died of natural causes.
