= Anita Wood =

American singer (1938–2023)

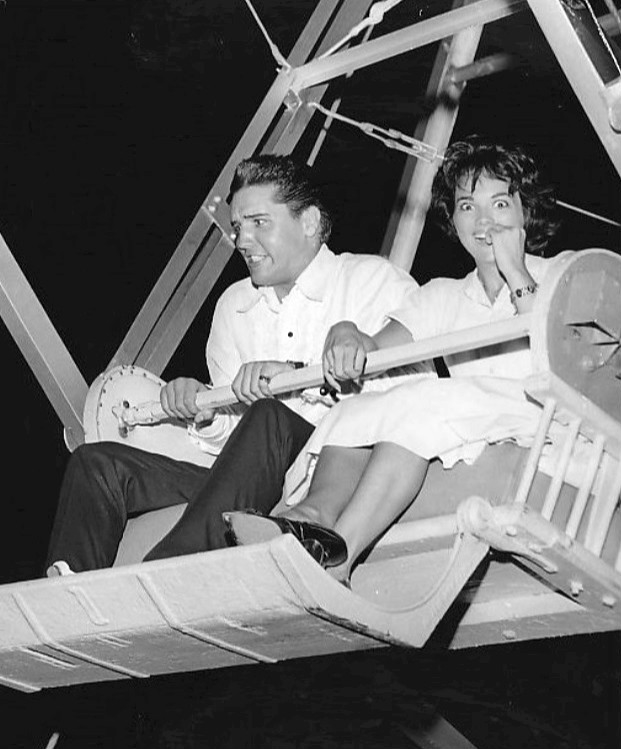
Wood and Presley on a Ferris wheel, 1960

Anita Marie Wood Brewer (May 27, 1938 – June 29, 2023), also known as Little Bitty and Little, was an American television performer, recording artist and girlfriend of Elvis Presley.

== Biography ==
Wood was born on May 27, 1938. A vocalist, she won the 1954 Youth Talent Contest at the Mid-South Fair, and a runner-up that same year for Miss Tennessee. A couple of years later, she worked with Wink Martindale on the "Top 10 Dance Party."

Anita recorded for ABC-Paramount (1958); Sun (1961); and Santo (1963). She also worked on The Andy Williams Show (summer 1958).

Presley and Wood met in 1957 and in the same year Presley referred to Wood as his "No. 1 Girl". The two dated non-exclusively from 1957 to 1962. Wood signed a contract to work as an actress for Paramount Pictures, but later gave it up for Presley.

== Personal life ==
She was married to National Football League player Johnny Brewer for 46 years from 1965 until his death in 2011.

In 1976, Johnny Brewer sued the Memphis Publishing Company for libel when it reported that Anita Brewer was divorced from Brewer and reunited with Presley in Las Vegas. Anita Wood appeared on the Larry King show in 2005 to talk about her romance with Elvis Presley.

Brewer died of pneumonia at St. Dominic's Hospital in Jackson, Mississippi, on June 29, 2023, at the age of 85.

== See also ==
- Relationships of Elvis Presley
