= Joe Eilers =

Canadian football player

Buddy Eilers
Profile
- Position: Defensive end

Personal information
- Born: January 19, 1939 (age 87); Lavaca County, Texas, U.S.
- Listed height: 6 ft 2 in (1.88 m)
- Listed weight: 240 lb (109 kg)

Career history
- 1966: Hamilton Tiger-Cats
- 1966: Saskatchewan Roughriders

Awards and highlights
- Second-team All-SWC (1960)

Joseph "Buddy" Eilers (born January 19, 1939) was an American professional football player who played for the Saskatchewan Roughriders and Hamilton Tiger-Cats. He previously played college football at Texas A&M University.
