= Dan McGrew =

American football player (1937–2019)

Daniel Atwood McGrew
No. 52, 59, 54, 76
- Position: Center

Personal information
- Born: April 7, 1937; Martins Ferry, Ohio, U.S.
- Died: November 7, 2019 (aged 82); Wheeling, West Virginia, U.S.
- Listed height: 6 ft 2 in (1.88 m)
- Listed weight: 250 lb (113 kg)

Career information
- High school: Martins Ferry
- College: Purdue
- NFL draft: 1959: 20th round, 232nd overall pick

Career history

Playing
- Buffalo Bills (1960); Denver Broncos (1961); Indianapolis Warriors (1961); Wheeling Ironmen (1962-1965)

Coaching
- Wheeling Ironmen (1967) Assistant coach

Awards and highlights
- Second-team All-AFL (1960)

Career AFL statistics
- Games played: 14
- Games started: 14
- Stats at Pro Football Reference

Daniel Atwood McGrew (April 7, 1937 – November 7, 2019) was an American football center.

== Purdue University ==
During his college years, McGrew was a center at Purdue University.

== NFL ==
McGrew was drafted in the 20th round by the Detroit Lions in 1959. In the following year, he was taken by the Buffalo Bills during their inaugural season, when he played in all 14 games and was their starting center. Although he ended up as an All-AFL 2nd team member, he was replaced the following year by rookie Al Bemiller and never played in another game in the NFL.

== Semi-pro ==
McGrew went on to play on the semi-pro level with the Wheeling Ironmen. On June 13, 2009, McGrew was one of eight new members in the 29th class to be inducted into the Minor Pro Football Hall of Fame.

== High school coaching ==
McGrew later coached football on the high school level. He coached at Chopticon High School, Morganza, MD, where his team won two Southern Maryland Athletic Conference (SMAC) championships, 1970 and 1971. During this time, he was a ninth grade gym teacher and drivers ed teacher. He retired from Weir High School after the 1998–99 school year.
