= 1960 All-Southwest Conference football team =

American college football all-star team

The 1960 All-Southwest Conference football team consists of American football players chosen by various organizations for All-Southwest Conference teams for the 1960 college football season. The selectors for the 1960 season included the Associated Press (AP) and the United Press (UP). Players selected as first-team players by both the AP and UP are designated in bold.

== All Southwest selections ==
=== Backs ===
- **Ronnie Bull**, Baylor (AP-1; UPI-1)
- **Lance Alworth**, Arkansas (AP-1; UPI-1)
- **Jimmy Saxton**, Texas (AP-1; UPI-1)
- Roland Jackson, Rice (AP-1)
- Ronnie Stanley, Baylor (AP-2)
- Colidge Hunt, Texas Tech (AP-2)
- Billy Cox, Rice (AP-2)
- George McKinney, Arkansas (AP-2)

=== Ends ===
- **John Burrell**, Rice (AP-1; UPI-1)
- **Jim Collier**, Arkansas (AP-1; UPI-1)
- Arnold Davis, Baylor (AP-2)
- Buddy Iles, Texas Christian (AP-2)

=== Tackles ===
- **Bob Lilly**, TCU (AP-1; UPI-1)
- **Jerry Mays**, SMU (AP-1; UPI-1)
- Joe Eilers, Texas A&M (AP-2)
- Robert Johnston, Rice (AP-2)

=== Guards ===
- **Monte Lee**, Texas (AP-1; UPI-1)
- **Wayne Harris**, Arkansas (AP-1; UPI-1)
- Bob Lively, Rice (AP-2)
- Herby Adkins, Baylor (AP-2)

=== Centers ===
- **E. J. Holub**, Texas Tech (AP-1; UPI-1)
- Boyd King, Rice (AP-2)

== Key ==
AP = Associated Press

UPI = United Press International

Bold = Consensus first-team selection of both the AP and UP

== See also ==
- 1960 College Football All-America Team
