= Ed Dyas =

American football player (1939–2011)

Profile
- Position: FB, Kicker

Personal information
- Born: November 21, 1939
- Died: January 23, 2011 (aged 71)

Career information
- College: Auburn University
- NFL draft: 1961: 5th round, 62 (By the Baltimore Colts)th overall pick
- AFL draft: 1961: 18th round, 144 (By the San Diego Chargers)th overall pick

Awards and highlights
- First-team All-American (1960); SEC Most Outstanding Back (1960); First-team All-SEC (1960); Second-team All-SEC (1959)
- College Football Hall of Fame

Edmund C. Dyas (November 11, 1939 – January 23, 2011) was an American football player, who played college football from 1958 to 1960 for the Auburn Tigers. He finished fourth for the Heisman Trophy his senior season. He was an integral member on the 1958 team that finished 9–0–1. Dyas was elected to the College Football Hall of Fame in 2009.

After his college football career, Dyas became an orthopedic surgeon in Mobile, Alabama. He died on January 23, 2011, aged 71, from stomach cancer.
