= Ken Rice (American football) =

American football player (1939–2020)

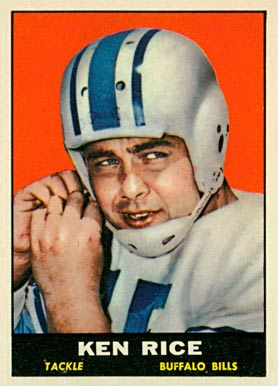
- Rice in 1961

No. 75
- Positions: Offensive tackle, guard

Personal information
- Born: September 14, 1939; Attapulgus, Georgia, U.S.
- Died: October 14, 2020 (aged 81); Canton, Georgia, U.S.
- Listed height: 6 ft 2 in (1.88 m)
- Listed weight: 240 lb (109 kg)

Career information
- High school: Bainbridge (Bainbridge, Georgia)
- College: Auburn (1957–1960)
- NFL draft: 1961: 1st round, 8th overall pick
- AFL draft: 1961: 1st round, 1st overall pick

Career history
- Buffalo Bills (1961–1963); Oakland Raiders (1964–1965); Miami Dolphins (1966–1967)

Awards and highlights
- AFL All-Star (1961); Consensus All-American (1960); First-team All-American (1959); 2× First-team All-SEC (1959, 1960)

Career AFL statistics
- Games played: 79
- Games started: 58
- Stats at Pro Football Reference

Kenneth Earl Rice (September 14, 1939 – October 14, 2020) was an American football offensive tackle and guard who played in the American Football League (AFL) for the Buffalo Bills, Oakland Raiders, and the Miami Dolphins. Rice played college football for the Auburn Tigers, where he was named a two-time All-American. He was selected by the Bills with the first overall pick of the 1961 AFL draft.

== Early life ==
Ken Rice was born in Attapulgus, Georgia on September 14, 1939, and moved to Bainbridge before high school. At Bainbridge High School, Rice played football, basketball, baseball, and took part in track and field. In track and field, Rice was a three-time state champion in shot put, a state champion in the discus throw and participated in relay races.

Rice received offers from FSU, Tennessee and Georgia Tech. Eventually, Rice chose to attend Auburn.

== College career ==
Rice attended Auburn University from 1957 to 1960, playing for the Tigers on both the offensive and defensive lines. As a sophomore in 1958, Rice was named to the SEC's All-Sophomore Team as the Tigers posted a 9–0–1 record. Rice was named an All-American in 1959 and was voted the best offensive lineman in the SEC. In his senior season, Rice was once again named an All-American and was once again voted the best offensive lineman in the SEC. Rice was also voted the best defensive lineman in the conference that year.

In 1992, Rice was elected into Auburn's Team of the Century by fans. Rice also lent his name to the Ken Rice Award, an annual award given to the best offensive lineman at Auburn.

== Professional career ==
Rice was drafted in the first round in both the 1961 NFL draft and the 1961 AFL draft. Rice played for seven years for the Buffalo Bills, Oakland Raiders, and the Miami Dolphins, playing in 79 games total. In 1961 during his rookie season, he was selected to the 1961 AFL All-Star game. He was also named a second-team All-AFL lineman that season.

In 1964, Rice was traded to the Oakland Raiders. In 1966, the Miami Dolphins drafted Rice from the Raiders during the 1966 AFL Expansion Draft. Rice retired from football after the 1967 season due to a back injury. He was inducted into the Georgia Sports Hall of Fame in 1989.

== Personal life ==
Rice resided in Big Canoe, Georgia, where he had been involved in real estate development since the early 1970s. Rice met Billie Ann Perrin while attending Auburn and the two married on June 20, 1959. The couple purchased the summit of Mount Oglethorpe, the original southern terminus of the Appalachian Trail, in 1995, and opened the summit to the public in 2014. Billie Ann Rice died on June 7, 2014, at age 77.

== See also ==
- Other American Football League players
