= Bob Yates =

American football player (1938–2013)

No. 50, 70
- Positions: Tackle, center

Personal information
- Born: November 20, 1938; Montpelier, Vermont, U.S.
- Died: April 16, 2013 (aged 74); Spring Branch, Texas, U.S.
- Listed height: 6 ft 1 in (1.85 m)
- Listed weight: 240 lb (109 kg)

Career information
- High school: Montpelier (VT)
- College: Syracuse
- NFL draft: 1960: 7th round, 84th overall pick
- AFL draft: 1960: 1st round

Career history
- Boston Patriots (1960–1965)

Awards and highlights
- National champion (1959); First-team All-American (1959); First-team All-Eastern (1959); Vermont Sports Hall of Fame (2012)

Career AFL statistics
- Games played: 68
- Games started: 26
- Stats at Pro Football Reference

Robert E. Yates (November 20, 1938 – April 16, 2013) was an American football offensive lineman who played college football for Syracuse and professionally in the American Football League (AFL) for the Boston Patriots. Born in Montpelier, Vermont, Yates was a standout student-athlete at Montpelier High School.

At Syracuse, Yates was a member of the undefeated Orange national championship team in 1959. He was named first-team All-American and was later honored as one of the "Forty Four Players of the Century" at Syracuse.

After graduation, Yates was an original member of the AFL's Boston Patriots, playing from 1960 to 1965 as an offensive lineman and kicker.

Yates coached and taught for 34 years at colleges and high schools in Massachusetts and Vermont, including Burlington High School. Steven Yates, one of three sons, played for him at BHS, which saw a football rebirth during Yates’ era from 1979 to 1987.

In 2012 he was inducted into the inaugural class of the Vermont Sports Hall of Fame.

== See also ==
- Other American Football League players
