= Al Bemiller =

American football player (1938–2022)

No. 50
- Positions: Center, guard, tackle

Personal information
- Born: April 18, 1938; Hanover, Pennsylvania, U.S.
- Died: November 30, 2022 (aged 84)
- Listed height: 6 ft 3 in (1.91 m)
- Listed weight: 243 lb (110 kg)

Career information
- High school: Hanover (PA)
- College: Syracuse
- NFL draft: 1961: 7th round, 94th overall pick
- AFL draft: 1961: 7th round, 52nd overall pick

Career history
- Buffalo Bills (1961–1969)

Awards and highlights
- 2× AFL champion (1964, 1965); AFL All-Star (1965); National champion (1959); Second-team All-Eastern (1959)

Career AFL statistics
- Games played: 126
- Games started: 123
- Fumble recoveries: 3
- Stats at Pro Football Reference

Albert Delane Bemiller (April 18, 1938 – November 30, 2022) was an American professional football player who was an offensive lineman for the Buffalo Bills of the American Football League (AFL). He played college football at Syracuse University. He was a member of two AFL championships with the Bills and was inducted into the Greater Buffalo Hall of Fame in 2015.

== Buffalo Bills ==
Bemiller was drafted as an offensive lineman by the Buffalo Bills in 1961, when he immediately became their starting center, replacing Dan McGrew, although the latter was the All-AFL 2nd team center in the Bills' inaugural season of 1960. During the 1961 season, Bemiller played in all 14 games, between fellow rookie Billy Shaw at left offensive guard and second year pro Chuck Muelhaupt at right guard, under head coach Buster Ramsey. In 1962, he continued to play center next to Shaw and new right guard Tom Day under new head coach Lou Saban. These three linemen would play together up to 1963, when the Bills tied for first place in the AFL east division, but lost a playoff game to the Boston Patriots.

In 1964, Bemiller was switched to right offensive guard, playing between veteran center Walt Cudzik and right offensive tackle Dick Hudson, when the Bills won their first AFL championship. They repeated in 1965, when Bemiller became an AFL All-Star at right guard, still next to Hudson but with a new center, Dave Behrman. In 1966, under new head coach Joe Collier, Bemiller switched back to center, playing between Shaw and right guard Joe O'Donnell. From 1967 to 1969, he remained the starting center but also played left offensive tackle in 1967. In 1968, he played between Shaw and Bob Kalsu and in 1969, his final year, between Shaw and O'Donnell.

Bemiller was replaced the following year by Frank Marchlewski. In his nine-year career with the Bills, he never missed a game.

== Post NFL ==
After playing for the Bills, Bemiller became a substitute teacher for the Buffalo Public Schools and could be seen on occasion at Hutchinson Central Technical High School in Buffalo, New York. Bemiller also worked 33 years as a high school wrestling official for the Niagara Frontier Wrestling Officials Association of section 6 (NYS), from 1970 to 2003 and was inducted into the Greater Buffalo Sports Hall of Fame. Bemiller also worked 25 years as a recreation coordinator at Wyoming Correctional Facility in Attica. Bemiller's grandson, quarterback Jake Dolegala, was signed as an undrafted free agent by the Cincinnati Bengals in 2019.

Bemiller died on November 30, 2022, at the age of 84.

== See also ==
- List of American Football League players
