= Jim Collier =

American football player and coach (1939–2026)

No. 84, 89
- Position: Tight end

Personal information
- Born: May 18, 1939; Van Buren, Arkansas, U.S.
- Died: September 13, 2026 (aged 87); Farmerville, Louisiana, U.S.
- Listed height: 6 ft 3 in (1.91 m)
- Listed weight: 205 lb (93 kg)

Career information
- High school: Van Buren
- College: Arkansas
- NFL draft: 1961: 7th round, 95th overall pick
- AFL draft: 1962: 31st round, 244th overall pick

Career history

Playing
- New York Giants (1962); Washington Redskins (1963)

Coaching
- LSU (1965–1979) Assistant coach

Awards and highlights
- 2× First-team All-SWC (1960, 1961)

Career NFL statistics
- Receptions: 1
- Receiving yards: 27
- Fumble recoveries: 1
- Stats at Pro Football Reference

James William Collier (May 18, 1939 – September 13, 2026) was an American professional football player who was a tight end in the National Football League (NFL) for the New York Giants and the Washington Redskins. He played college football for the Arkansas Razorbacks and was selected in the seventh round of the 1961 NFL draft. Collier was also selected in the 31st round of the 1962 AFL draft by the Buffalo Bills. Collier scored the Giants' only touchdown in the 1962 championship game when he recovered a blocked Packers' punt on the goal line.

== Early life and college ==
Collier was born in Van Buren, Arkansas on May 18, 1939. He grew up in his hometown, graduating from Van Buren High School in 1957. He played numerous sports in high school, being named all state as a football quarterback and all district in basketball, as well as setting his school's track and field record for pole vault. He attended the University of Arkansas, where he played college football with the Razorbacks from 1959 to 1961. He was a wide receiver and had 514 receiving yards and five receiving touchdowns over 28 receptions throughout his three years. In the 1960 season he had three receiving touchdowns, tying him for most in the Southwest Conference. In college, he also played basketball his first year and competed in pole vault for two years.

== NFL career ==
After graduating, the New York Giants drafted him as the 95th pick of the seventh round of the 1961 NFL draft. The Giants had a 12–2 record during their 1962 season and finished first in the NFL Eastern division. Collier wore number 84 and played 13 games with one reception for 27 yards. However, he did not get much playing time because he was behind teammates such as Frank Gifford, Del Shofner, and Joe Walton, and he "didn't run fast enough to play in the pros." He scored the only touchdown for the New York Giants in the 1962 NFL Championship Game against the Green Bay Packers when he recovered Packer Max McGee's punt on the goal line after Erich Barnes broke through the defense and blocked the ball. After scoring the extra point, the Giants trailed 10–7 but did not score again and ended up losing the game 16–7.

Collier was selected as the 244th pick of the 31st round of the 1962 AFL draft by the Buffalo Bills, but he played for the Washington Redskins, wearing number 89. During the 1963 Washington Redskins season, in which the Redskins finished sixth in the NFL Eastern division with a record of 3–11, he played 14 games with no receptions. After that season he stopped playing in the NFL.

== Coaching career ==
From 1965 to 1980, Collier was a wide receiver coach for the LSU Tigers under head coach Charles McClendon. He was also a recruiter there, although he said that "we had players there who would have come there without a scholarship. It was a tradition." While he was coach, he was relaxed, even letting players borrow his boat to go fishing; Collier once said, "I guess the NCAA would put you in jail for something like this now. Bert [Jones] and Tommy [Casanova] used to come out on Sundays and ask, 'Coach, can we borrow your boat? We want to go fishing.'"

== Personal life and death ==
Following his coaching career, Collier owned two car care franchises in Baton Rouge. Collier was married to his wife, Judy, for 65 years and the couple had two daughters.

Collier died in Farmerville, Louisiana on September 13, 2026, at the age of 87.
