= Roger Davis (American football) =

American football player (1938–2024)

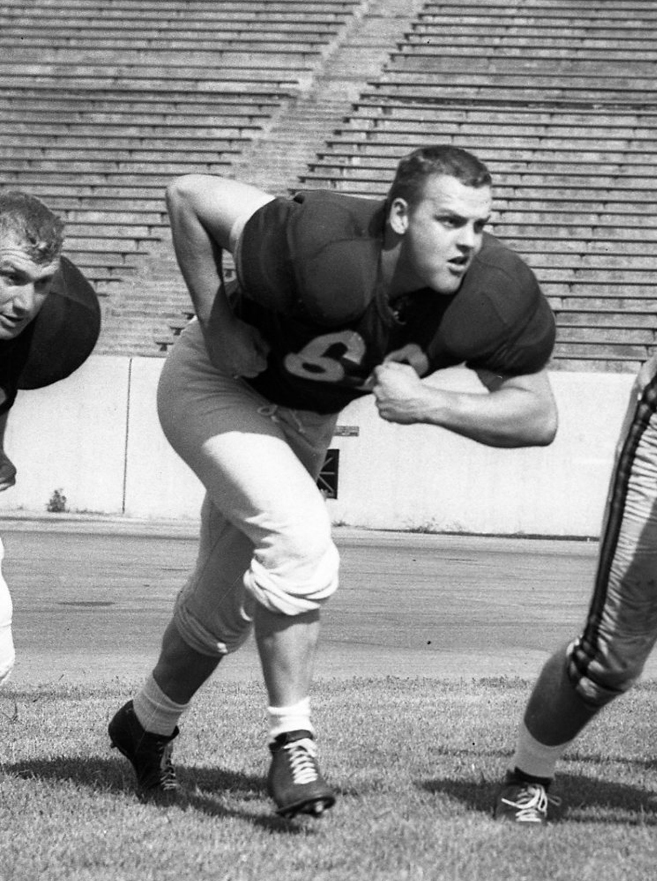
- Davis with the Chicago Bears in 1961

No. 60, 67, 74, 66
- Positions: Guard, tackle

Personal information
- Born: June 23, 1938; Cleveland, Ohio, U.S.
- Died: March 6, 2024 (aged 85)
- Listed height: 6 ft 3 in (1.91 m)
- Listed weight: 240 lb (109 kg)

Career information
- High school: Solon (Solon, Ohio)
- College: Syracuse
- NFL draft: 1960: 1st round, 7th overall pick
- AFL draft: 1960: 2nd round

Career history
- Chicago Bears (1960–1963); Los Angeles Rams (1964); New York Giants (1965–1966)

Awards and highlights
- NFL champion (1963); National champion (1959); UPI Lineman of the Year (1959); Unanimous All-American (1959); First-team All-Eastern (1959)

Career NFL statistics
- Games played: 72
- Games started: 43
- Fumble recoveries: 2
- Stats at Pro Football Reference

Roger Wilfred Davis (June 23, 1938 – March 6, 2024) was an American professional football player who was an offensive lineman for seven seasons for the Chicago Bears, Los Angeles Rams, and New York Giants of the National Football League (NFL). He played college football for the Syracuse Orange. Davis was selected by the Bears in the first round of the 1960 NFL draft with the 7th overall pick, and is one of only two guards taken in the first round by the team (Kyle Long being the other).

Davis died on March 6, 2024, at the age of 85.
