= Jake Gibbs =

American baseball player (born 1938)

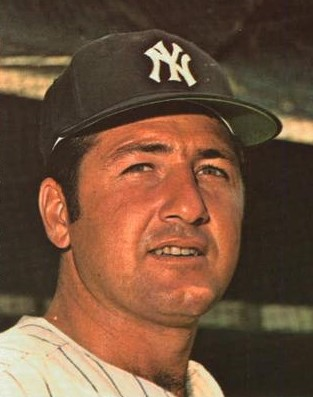
- Catcher
- Born: November 7, 1938 (age 87); Grenada, Mississippi, U.S.
- Batted: Left Threw: Right

MLB debut
- September 11, 1962, for the New York Yankees

Last MLB appearance
- September 29, 1971, for the New York Yankees

MLB statistics
- Batting average: .233
- Home runs: 25
- Runs batted in: 146
- Stats at Baseball Reference

Teams
- New York Yankees (1962–1971)

Jerry Dean "Jake" Gibbs (born November 7, 1938) is an American former Major League Baseball player who played for the New York Yankees as a platoon catcher from 1962 to 1971. Although Gibbs was the regular starting catcher for New York in 1967 and 1968, he was primarily a back-up for Elston Howard and then Thurman Munson at the tail-end of his career.

Prior to beginning his professional baseball career, Gibbs had successful careers in college baseball and college football at the University of Mississippi (Ole Miss) for the Ole Miss Rebels. He was also a member of the Pi Kappa Alpha (PIKE) Fraternity. He returned to Ole Miss to coach the baseball and football teams.

== Amateur career ==
Gibbs attended the University of Mississippi, where he played quarterback for the Ole Miss Rebels football team, and also played for the Ole Miss Rebels baseball team. Both teams compete in the Southeastern Conference (SEC). Gibbs led the Rebels to their first SEC baseball championship, in 1959.

During his junior football season, Gibbs was best remembered for punting the ball to Louisiana State University All-American Billy Cannon in a Halloween Night game at Tiger Stadium. On a third-and-19 with 10 minutes remaining, and the third-ranked Rebels ahead of defending national champion and top-ranked LSU 3-0, Cannon picked up the ball on one bounce at his own 11-yard line and raced past the Rebel coverage unit, including Gibbs, 89 yards for the game's only touchdown. The play helped Cannon win the 1959 Heisman Memorial Trophy.

The 7-3 loss cost Ole Miss a chance at the wire service national championships, since those polls were voted upon at the time prior to bowl games and did not take into account Ole Miss' 21-0 humiliation of LSU in the 1960 Sugar Bowl, 62 days after the teams played in Baton Rouge.

During his senior year at Mississippi, Gibbs led the football team to a 10–0–1 record, with the lone blemish a 6-6 deadlock against an inferior LSU squad (the Tigers went 5-4-1 after winning 20 of 22 games in 1958 and 1959) at Oxford, Mississippi. The Rebels won the 1961 Sugar Bowl, defeating the Rice Owls football team 14-6, as Gibbs scored both touchdowns. The Rebels were recognized as national champions by the Football Writers Association of America. Gibbs was named to the 1960 College Football All-America Team. That year, he was also named SEC Player of the Year.

== Professional career ==
Gibbs decided instead to go professional in baseball despite being drafted by the Houston Oilers of the American Football League and Cleveland Browns of the National Football League in 1961. Gibbs signed with the New York Yankees in 1961, receiving a $100,000 signing bonus under the bonus rule. Gibbs signed as a third baseman and shortstop.

He began his professional career with the Richmond Virginians of the International League; he recorded five hits in a double header in his professional debut and started his career with an eight-game hitting streak. The Yankees optioned him to Richmond in 1962, but his season was limited by injuries. The Yankees asked Gibbs to switch to catcher in 1963. Gibbs spent the 1963 season with the Virginians, before the Yankees promoted him again in September.

Gibbs spent his four first professional seasons in minor league baseball, where his highest season batting average was .284 and he managed to hit 28 home runs across the four seasons. With Yogi Berra's retirement before the 1964 season, Gibbs competed for a spot on the Yankees' roster. He was unable to appear in the 1964 World Series due to broken fingers. He also missed the end of the 1966 season after suffering a broken left hand. Gibbs backed up Elston Howard for a number of years. When the Yankees traded Howard during the 1967 season, Gibbs became the team's starting catcher. He eventually lost the first-string job to Thurman Munson, but continued as a back-up with the team. In June 1971, he announced his retirement from baseball, effective at the end of the season. He played his final game on September 29, 1971.

== Coaching career ==
Gibbs returned to Ole Miss as an assistant football coach in 1965, working during the Yankees' offseason. In this role, Gibbs mentored Heisman Trophy finalist quarterback Archie Manning.

After the 1971 season, Gibbs returned to Ole Miss full-time as a baseball coach and football recruiter. In 1972, he coached Ole Miss to the SEC championship. The team set an SEC record for consecutive conference wins, and went to Omaha for the 1972 College World Series (CWS), and Gibbs was named coach of the year. Gibbs was named coach of the year again in 1977. Gibbs retired in 1990 with 485 wins, more than any coach in Ole Miss history, though this was later surpassed on March 9, 2013, by Mike Bianco.

Gibbs returned to the Yankees' organization in 1993 as the team's bullpen catcher. In 1994 and 1995, Gibbs managed the Tampa Yankees, the Yankees' Class A-Advanced affiliate in the Florida State League.

== Honors ==
On February 15, 2020, Gibbs' baseball number, 41, was retired in a ceremony prior to the Ole Miss baseball game vs Louisville.

In 1995, Gibbs was inducted into the College Football Hall of Fame. He appeared at the Yankees' Old-Timers' Day in 2012 and 2014.

== See also ==
- List of Major League Baseball players who spent their entire career with one franchise
