= Fred Mautino =

American football player (born 1936)

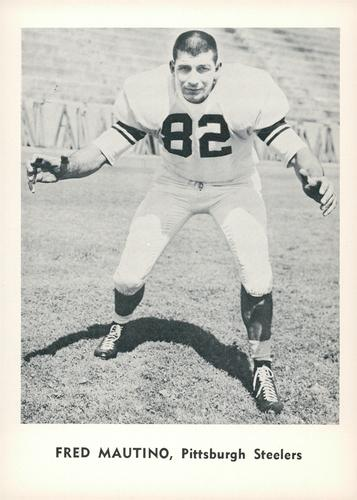
- Mautino with the Pittsburgh Steelers in 1961

Profile
- Position: End

Personal information
- Born: November 7, 1936 (age 89); Reading, Pennsylvania, U.S.
- Listed weight: 194 lb (88 kg)

Career information
- High school: Staunton (VA) Military Academy
- College: Syracuse
- NFL draft: 1961: 5th round, 59th overall pick
- AFL draft: 1961: 7th round, 54th overall pick

Awards and highlights
- National champion (1959); First-team All-American (1959); Third-team All-American (1960); 2× First-team All-Eastern (1959, 1960)

Frederick J. Mautino (born November 7, 1936) was an American football player.

A native of Reading, Pennsylvania, Mautino attended Reading Senior High School and Staunton Military Academy. He then played college football at the end position for Syracuse. He helped lead the 1959 Syracuse Orangemen football team to the school's only national championship.

Prior to the 1960 Cotton Bowl, Mautino proclaimed the 1959 Orangemen "the greatest college team of all time." He was selected by the Associated Press as a first-team player on its 1959 College Football All-America Team. He was also selected at the 1959 athlete of the year for Berks County, Pennsylvania.

As a senior in 1960, he was selected as a third-team All-American by the American Football Coaches Association and the United Press International.
