= Tom Goode (American football) =

American football player, coach, and administrator (1938–2015)

- Goode in 1970

No. 35, 68, 58, 54
- Positions: Center, linebacker

Personal information
- Born: December 1, 1938; West Point, Mississippi, U.S.
- Died: October 8, 2015 (aged 76); West Point, Mississippi, U.S.
- Listed height: 6 ft 3 in (1.91 m)
- Listed weight: 250 lb (113 kg)

Career information
- High school: West Point
- College: East Mississippi CC; Mississippi State (1957–1960)
- NFL draft: 1961: 17th round, 234th overall pick
- AFL draft: 1961: 2nd round, 15th overall pick

Career history

Playing
- Houston Oilers (1962–1965); Miami Dolphins (1966–1969); Baltimore Colts (1970)

Coaching
- Mississippi State (1972–1975) Offensive line coach; Calgary Stampeders (1976) Offensive coordinator; Vanderbilt (1977) Offensive coordinator; Ole Miss (1978–1982) Assistant head coach; Alabama (1983) Offensive line coach; Mississippi State (1984–1989) Offensive line coach; Vanderbilt (1990–1991) Offensive line coach; East Mississippi (1991–2003) Head coach

Operations
- East Mississippi (1991–2003) Athletic director

Awards and highlights
- Super Bowl champion (V); AFL All-Star (1969); Second-team All-American (1959); First-team All-SEC (1960); Second-team All-SEC (1959); Kodak All-American (1960)

Career NFL/AFL statistics
- Games played: 113
- Games started: 69
- Fumble recoveries: 3
- Stats at Pro Football Reference

Head coaching record
- Career: 47–61–0 (.435)

Thomas Guinne Goode (December 1, 1938 – October 8, 2015) was an American professional football offensive lineman, coach, and administrator from West Point, Mississippi. He is probably best remembered as the long snapper on Jim O'Brien's game winning field goal in Super Bowl V that gave the Baltimore Colts a 16–13 victory over the Dallas Cowboys

== Early life ==
Goode was born in West Point, Mississippi and attended West Point High School. During his time in high school he played football, basketball and ran track.

== College ==
He played his college football at Mississippi State, where he played both center and linebacker. He was a three-time All-SEC selection from 1958 to 1960 and the school's first Kodak All-American in 1960. He played in The Blue-Gray Game in 1960, the Senior Bowl in 1961, and the All-American game in 1961. In addition to his athletic achievements he was also selected as Mr. Mississippi State, and named to Who's Who in American Colleges and Universities in 1961. Following his college career he was drafted by both the Houston Oilers of the American Football League and the Detroit Lions of the National Football League.

== Professional career ==
He spent four seasons with the Houston Oilers (1962–1965) before moving on to play for the Miami Dolphins for four seasons (1966–1969). Goode was named the Dolphins' Most Valuable Player in 1967, the team's Most Outstanding Offensive Lineman in 1966 and 1969 and was named to the Pro Bowl in 1969. He played his final season with the Baltimore Colts in 1970 where he was the long snapper for Jim O'Brien's game-winning field goal in Super Bowl V, making him the first player from Mississippi State to win a Super Bowl.

== Coaching career ==
Following his retirement from the NFL, Goode went on to serve as a coach at the college and professional levels. He began his coaching career at Mississippi State as the offensive line coach from 1972 to 1975. He then went on to be the offensive coordinator for the Calgary Stampeders of the Canadian Football League in 1976, and he served in the same capacity at Vanderbilt in 1977 before serving as the assistant head coach at Ole Miss from 1978 until 1982. In 1983, he became the offensive line coach at Alabama in before returning to MSU, as the offensive line coach for a second time from 1984 to 1989. He then did a second stint as the offensive line coach at Vanderbilt from 1990 through 1991 before becoming the head coach and athletic director at East Mississippi Community College, where he served from 1991 until retiring in 2003.

== Career highlights ==
NFL/AFL

- Super Bowl champion (V)
- AFL All-Star (1969)
- Iron Man Award (1969)

College

- Second-team All-American (1959)
- First-team All-SEC (1960)
- Second-team All-SEC (1959)
- Kodak All-American (1960)
- Blue-Gray Game (1960)
- Coaches All-America Game (1961)
- Senior Bowl (1961)
- Mississippi Sportsman of the Year (1974)
- Mississippi State University Sports Hall of Fame (1976)
- Mississippi Association of Community & Junior Colleges Coach of the Year (1996)
- All-American Football Foundation Lifetime Achievement Award (1996)
- All-American Football Foundation Unsung Hero Award (1998)
- East Mississippi Community College Sports Hall of Fame (2014)
- Mississippi Community and Junior College Sports Hall of Fame (2015)

Other

- Mississippi Sports Hall of Fame (1990)

== Personal life ==
Goode was married for over 19 years to the former Sonia Buffington Foster of Canton, Mississippi, and they were parents of three boys, Tommy, Michael, and Brin Foster, and two girls, Lessie (Goode) Belk and Sandi (Foster) May. They also had seven grandchildren and three great-grandchildren. His biography entitled Guts, God, and the Superbowl was published by Zondervan Publishing House in 1974 and written by Zola Levitt. He died on October 8, 2015.
