= 1959 All-America college football team =

Official list of the best college football players of 1959

The 1959 All-America college football team is composed of college football players who were selected as All-Americans by various organizations and writers that chose All-America college football teams in 1959. The six selectors recognized by the NCAA as "official" for the 1959 season are (1) the American Football Coaches Association (AFCA), (2) the Associated Press (AP), (3) the Football Writers Association of America (FWAA), (4) the Newspaper Enterprise Association (NEA), (5) The Sporting News (TSN), and (6) the United Press International (UPI).

Billy Cannon of LSU, Charlie Flowers of Ole Miss, Dan Lanphear of Wisconsin, and Roger Davis of Syracuse were the only four players to be unanimously named first-team All-Americans by all six official selectors. Cannon won the 1959 Heisman Trophy.

== Consensus All-Americans ==
For the year 1959, the NCAA recognizes six published All-American teams as "official" designations for purposes of its consensus determinations. The following chart identifies the NCAA-recognized consensus All-Americans and displays which first-team designations they received.

Name	Position	School	Number	Official	Other
Dan Lanphear	Tackle	Wisconsin	6/6	AFCA, AP, FWAA, NEA, TSN, UPI	CP, Time, WC
Roger Davis	Guard	Syracuse	6/6	AFCA, AP, FWAA, NEA, TSN, UPI	CP, Time, WC
Billy Cannon	Halfback	LSU	6/6	AFCA, AP, FWAA, NEA, TSN, UPI	CP, Time, WC
Charlie Flowers	Fullback	Ole Miss	6/6	AFCA, AP, FWAA, NEA, TSN, UPI	CP, WC
Ron Burton	Halfback	Northwestern	5/6	AFCA, FWAA, NEA, TSN, UPI	CP, Time, WC
Richie Lucas	Quarterback	Penn State	5/6	AFCA, FWAA, NEA, TSN, UPI	CP, WC
Bill Carpenter	End	Army	5/6	AFCA, FWAA, NEA, TSN, UPI	WC
Maxie Baughan	Center	Georgia Tech	4/6	AFCA, AP, TSN, UPI	CP, Time, WC
Don Floyd	Tackle	TCU	3/6	AFCA, AP, UPI	CP, WC
Bill Burrell	Guard	Illinois	3/6	AP, FWAA, UPI	CP, WC
Monty Stickles	End	Notre Dame	2/6	SN, UPI	CP, WC

== All-American selections for 1959 ==
=== Ends ===
- Bill Carpenter, Army (AP-3, UPI-1, NEA-1, WC, AFCA, FWAA, CP-2, TSN)
- Monty Stickles, Notre Dame (AP-2, TSN, UPI-1, CP-1, WC)
- Marlin McKeever, USC (AP-1, FWAA, NEA-3, UPI-3)
- Chris Burford, Stanford (AFCA, NEA-3, UPI-2, CP-2, Time)
- Carroll Dale, Virginia Tech (AP-2, NEA-1, FWAA)
- Jim Houston, Ohio State (CP-1, NEA-2, UPI-2, Time)
- Don Norton, Iowa (FWAA, NEA-2, UPI-3, CP-3)
- Fred Mautino, Syracuse (AP-1)
- Paul Maguire, The Citadel (AP-3)
- Mike Ditka, Pittsburgh (CP-3)

=== Tackles ===
- Dan Lanphear, Wisconsin (AP-1, UPI-1, NEA-1, CP-1, WC, AFCA, FWAA, TSN, Time)
- Don Floyd, TCU (AP-1, NEA-3, UPI-1, CP-1, WC, AFCA)
- Ken Rice, Auburn (AP-2, FWAA, NEA-1, UPI-3)
- Bob Yates, Syracuse (TSN)
- Lou Cordileone, Clemson (AP-3, UPI-3, NEA-3, Time)
- Mike Magac, Missouri (AP-2, NEA-2, CP-2)
- Dan Ficca, USC (UPI-2, CP-3)
- Gene Gossage, Northwestern (NEA-2, UPI-2, CP-2)
- Jerry Thompson, Oklahoma (AP-3)
- Harry Olivar, Yale (CP-3)

=== Guards ===
- Roger Davis, Syracuse (AP-1, UPI-1, NEA-1, CP-1, WC, AFCA, FWAA, TSN, Time)
- Bill Burrell, Illinois (AP-1, NEA-3, UPI-1, CP-1, WC, FWAA)
- Zeke Smith, Auburn (AFCA, TSN, UPI-2, CP-3)
- Mike McGee, Duke (FWAA, NEA-2, UPI-3, CP-3, Time)
- Mike McKeever, USC (AP-3, NEA-1, UPI-2)
- Maurice Doke, Texas (AP-2, FWAA)
- Pat Dye, Georgia (FWAA, NEA-2)
- Marvin Terrell, Mississippi (AP-3, FWAA, NEA-3, CP-2)
- Jerry Stalcup, Wisconsin (AP-2, UPI-3, CP-2)

=== Centers ===
- Maxie Baughan, Georgia Tech (AP-1, UPI-1, CP-1, WC, AFCA, TSN, Time)
- E. J. Holub, Texas Tech (AP-2, NEA-1, FWAA, CP-2)
- Jim Andreotti, Northwestern (AP-3, FWAA)
- Jackie Burkett, Auburn (UPI-2)
- Tom Goode, Mississippi State (NEA-2)
- Max Fugler, LSU (UPI-3, CP-3)
- Bob Peterson, Oregon (NEA-3)

=== Quarterbacks ===
- Richie Lucas, Penn State (AFCA, AP-2, FWAA, NEA-1, TSN, UPI-1, CP-1, WC)
- Don Meredith, Southern Methodist (AP-3, FWAA, NEA-2, UPI-2, Time)
- Bob Schloredt, Washington (AP-1, CP-3)

=== Halfbacks ===
- Billy Cannon, LSU (AP-1, UPI-1, NEA-1, CP-1, WC, AFCA, FWAA, TSN, Time)
- Ron Burton, Northwestern (AFCA, AP-2, FWAA, NEA-1, TSN, UPI-1, CP-1, WC, Time)
- Jim Mooty, Arkansas (AP-1, NEA-3)
- Dean Look, Michigan State (FWAA, NEA-3 [qb], UPI-2)
- Dwight Nichols, Iowa State (AP-3, FWAA, NEA-2, UPI-3)
- Fran Curci, Miami (AP-2)
- Dale Hackbart, Wisconsin (UPI-2, CP-2 [qb])
- Ernie Davis, Syracuse (UPI-2)
- Keith Lincoln, Washington State (NEA-2)
- Jake Crouthamel, Dartmouth (CP-2)
- Tom Moore, Vanderbilt (AP-3)
- Prentice Gautt, Oklahoma (UPI-3)
- Gerhard Schwedes, Syracuse (UPI-3, CP-2)
- Jack Collins, Texas (NEA-3, CP-3)
- Bob Jeter, Iowa (CP-3)

=== Fullbacks ===
- Charlie Flowers, Mississippi (AP-1, UPI-1, NEA-1, CP-1, WC, AFCA, FWAA, TSN)
- Bob White, Ohio State (Time)
- Jack Spikes, TCU (AP-2, FWAA, NEA-2, UPI-3, CP-2)
- Don Perkins, New Mexico (AP-3)
- Sam Horner, VMI (NEA-3)
- Tom Watkins, Iowa State (CP-3)

== Key ==
- **Bold** – Consensus All-American
- -1 – First-team selection
- -2 – Second-team selection
- -3 – Third-team selection

=== Official selectors ===
- AFCA = American Football Coaches Association
- AP = Associated Press, "selected on the basis of recommendations of 12 regional boards composed of newspapermen and newscasters"
- FWAA = Football Writers Association of America
- NEA = Newspaper Enterprise Association
- TSN = The Sporting News
- UPI = United Press International

=== Other selectors ===
- CP = Central Press Association
- Time = Time magazine
- WC = Walter Camp Football Foundation

== See also ==
- 1959 All-Atlantic Coast Conference football team
- 1959 All-Big Eight Conference football team
- 1959 All-Big Ten Conference football team
- 1959 All-Pacific Coast football team
- 1959 All-SEC football team
- 1959 All-Southwest Conference football team
