= Novogratz =

Novogratz is a surname. Notable people with the surname include:

- Bob Novogratz (1937–2026), American football player
- Jacqueline Novogratz (born 1961), American entrepreneur and author
- Michael Novogratz (born 1964), American investor
- Wolfgang Novogratz (born 1997), American actor and model
