= Fort Hunt High School =

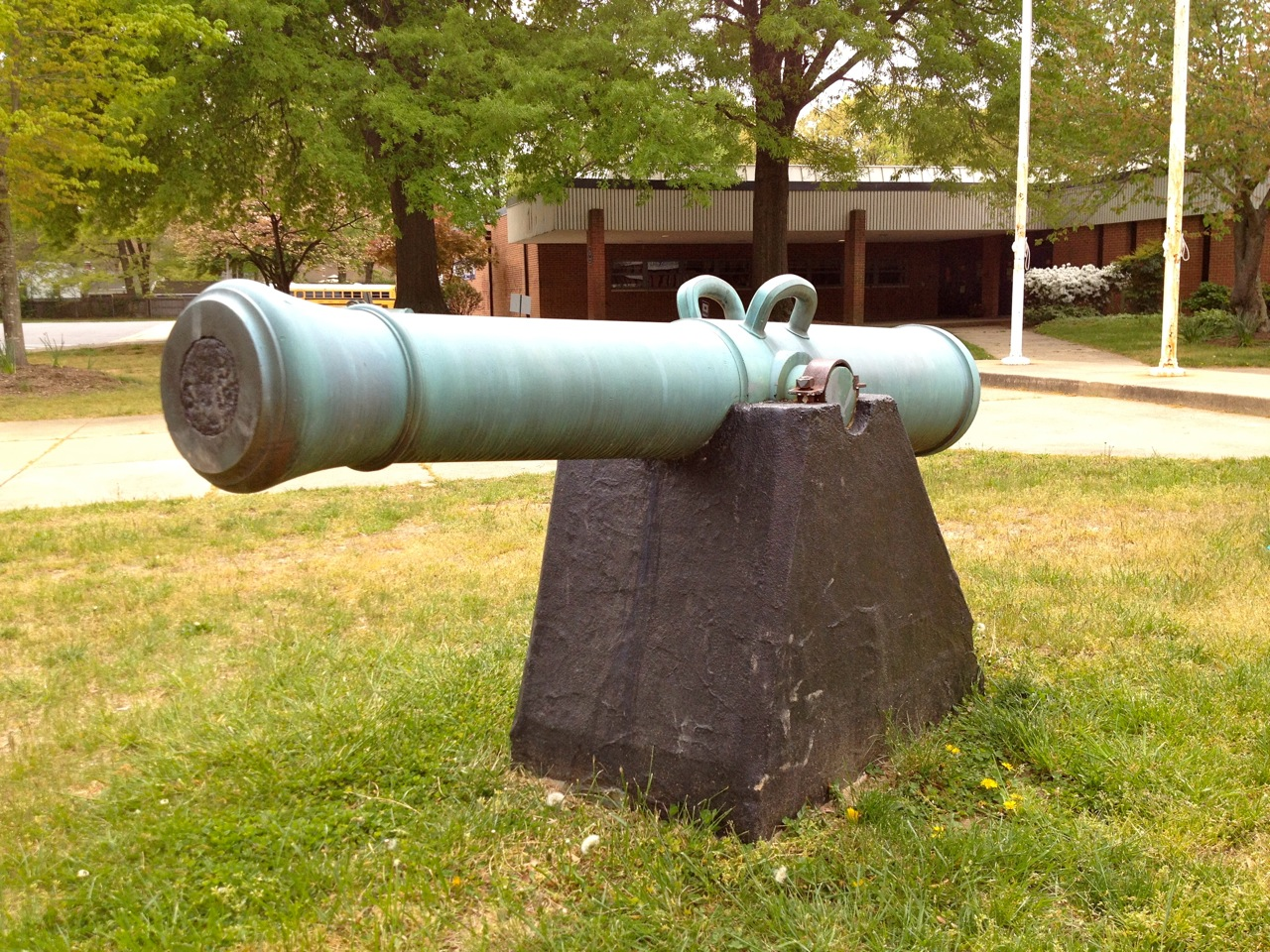
- Cannon in front of Fort Hunt High School

Location
- 8428 Fort Hunt Road; Alexandria, Virginia 22308; 38°43′41.6″N 77°3′27.8″W

Information
- School type: Public high school
- Founded: 1963
- Status: now Carl Sandburg Middle School
- Closed: 1985
- School district: Fairfax County Public Schools
- Grades: 9–12
- Language: English
- Campus: Suburban
- Colors: Green and gold originally green and white
- Mascot: Federals
- Feeder schools: Stephen Foster Intermediate School
- Rival Schools: Groveton High School; Mount Vernon High School

Fort Hunt High School was a public secondary school in Fairfax, Virginia, United States, from 1963 until 1985, when it was converted to a middle school.

Constructed at a cost of $2.5 million, Fort Hunt High opened its doors at 8428 Fort Hunt Road in 1963, toward the end of the post–World War II baby boom, as part of the Fairfax County Public Schools.

The school suffered $4.5 million in fire damage as the result of arson on December 30, 1978, when two seniors at the school and a 1978 graduate threw Molotov cocktails into the building. The fire resulted in the forced relocation of 1,700 students who were sent on a split shift to nearby Groveton and Mount Vernon High schools through the remainder of the 1978–79 school year.

In 1985, due to declining enrollment, and after contentious political and legal battles to keep the school open, Fort Hunt was combined with Groveton High School to form West Potomac High School, located on Groveton's campus. The Fort Hunt campus was converted into Carl Sandburg Middle School, which replaced the older Stephen Foster and Bryant Intermediate Schools.

A large community of Fort Hunt High School alumni remains active online, organizing regular all-school and all-year reunion gatherings, and granting annual scholarships to graduating seniors of West Potomac High School.

== School institutions ==
The yearbook was called The Fortress. The school paper was called The Frontline. The athletic teams were called the Federals.

== Notable alumni ==
- Robert C. Michelson, '69 — American engineer and academic Recipient of the Pirelli Award for the diffusion of scientific culture, and the first €25,000 Top Pirelli Prize
- Rick Atkinson, '70 — Pulitzer Prize winning author
- Carl C. Perkins, '72 — member of the United States House of Representatives from Kentucky's 7th congressional district, 1983–1993
- Admiral James A. Winnefeld, Jr., "Sandy", '74 — Vice Chairman of the Joint Chiefs of Staff, Aug. 4, 2011 – July 31, 2015
- Phoef Sutton, '76 — Emmy Award-winning TV writer/producer of Cheers
- Wendy B. Lawrence, '77 — NASA astronaut
- Rocky Belk, '79 — NFL player
- Carolyn Cole, '79 — Pulitzer Prize winning photographer
- Jacqueline Novogratz '79 — founder of Acumen
- Robert Novogratz '81 — real estate investor, designer, and television host on HGTV and Bravo
- Hoda Kotb, '82 — co-host of the NBC's Today
- Michael Novogratz '84 — investor and CEO of Galaxy Investment Partners.
