= Michael Novogratz =

American businessman

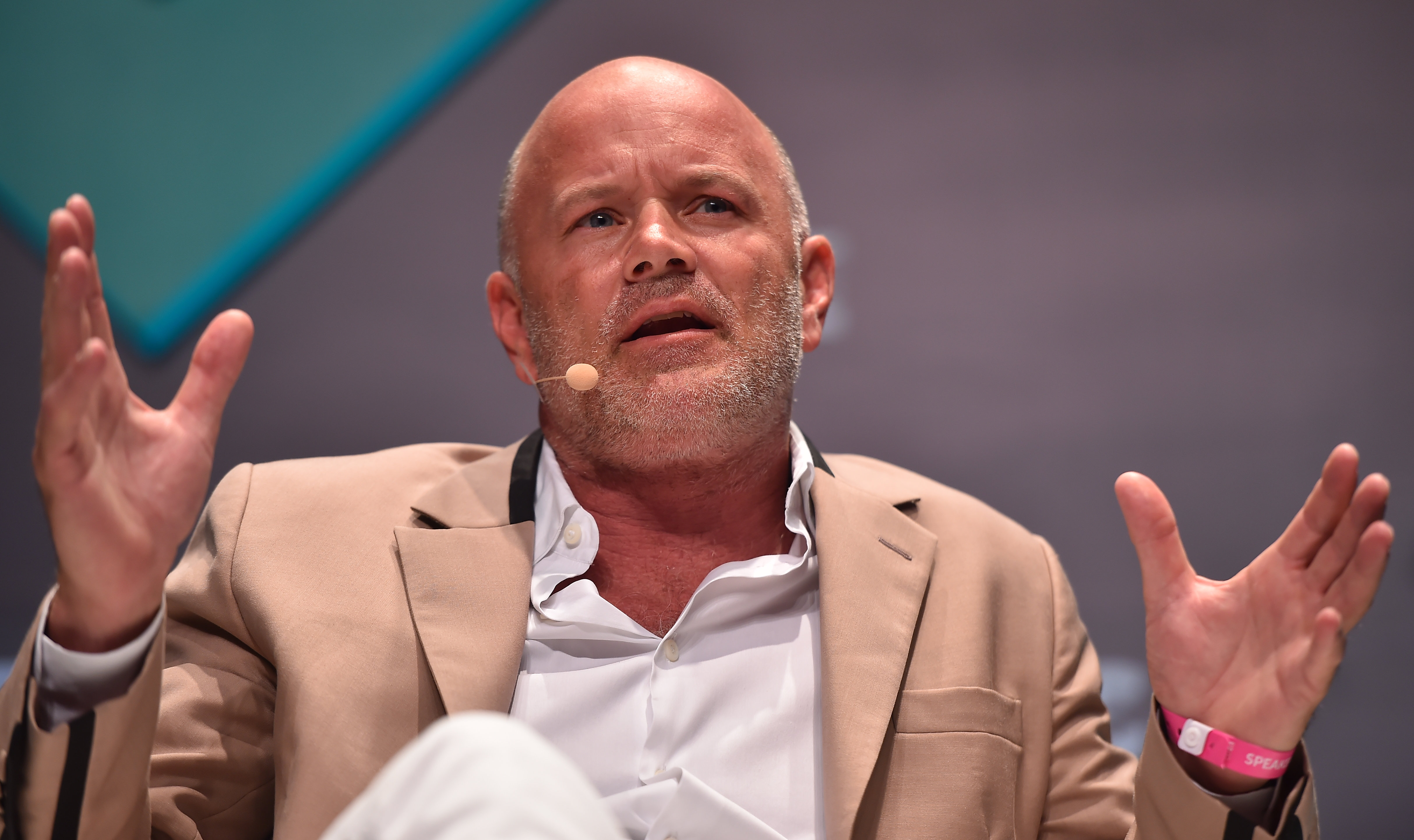
- Born: November 26, 1964 (age 61)
- Education: Fort Hunt High School
- Alma mater: Princeton University
- Occupation: Investment banker
- Spouse: Dora Caceres
- Children: 4
- Relatives: Jacqueline Novogratz (sister); Chris Anderson (brother-in-law); Wolfgang Novogratz (nephew); Bob Novogratz (father)

Michael Edward Novogratz (born November 26, 1964) is an American investor, co-founder and former president of Fortress Investment Group, where he also was CIO of the Fortress Macro Fund. He is the founder and CEO of Galaxy Digital which focuses on investments in cryptocurrency.

== Early life ==
Raised in Alexandria, Virginia, Novogratz is the third of seven children of West Point football lineman and 1958 Knute Rockne Award (best lineman) winner Robert, Sr. He attended Fort Hunt High School. Novogratz was state of Virginia high school wrestling runner-up, and then Princeton wrestling captain. Novogratz was first team All-Ivy League in both 1986 (150-pound (68.0 kg)) and 1987 (158-pound (71.7 kg)). He qualified for the National Collegiate Athletic Association (NCAA) wrestling championships in both 1986 and 1987 (both at 150-pound (68.0 kg)). Novogratz earned his A.B. in economics at Princeton. At the 1987 NCAA wrestling championships, he made it to the round of 16 in the winners bracket and was eliminated from the consolation bracket in the round of 12.

== Career ==
After a stint in the New Jersey National Guard that included service as a helicopter pilot, Novogratz began his career with Goldman Sachs in 1989. On April 1, 1989, he joined the firm as a short-term bond (money market) salesman. Novogratz lived in Asia from 1992 to 1999. He took a salesman position for Goldman in Tokyo in 1992, and eventually Jon Corzine sent him to Hong Kong to run a trading desk for the firm. He was elected partner at Goldman in 1998. Among the positions that he held at Goldman were president of Goldman Sachs Latin America and the head of fixed income, currencies and commodities risk in Asia. Novogratz claims his departure from Goldman, a year after the firm went public, was due to the consequences of "partying like a rockstar".

In March 2002, Novogratz joined Fortress Investments in time to join Wesley Edens, Robert Kauffman, Randal Nardone and Peter Briger, Jr. in taking the company public through its February 9, 2007, initial public offering. During the IPO, the company sold an 8% share to the public for $600 million. Before assuming his roles at Fortress as principal and director of Fortress Credit Corporation in 2006, he was co-Chief Information Officer of Macro Funds at Fortress Investment Group LLC. Although the Fortress' domain included both hedge funds and private-equity investments, Novogratz and his fellow Princetonian Briger ran the hedge funds. Although the stock price had risen to $35 at its IPO, by December 3, 2008, it dipped to as low as $1.87 after withdrawals from Novogratz' Drawbridge Global Macro fund were shut off. Fortress folded after Novogratz and his colleagues lost hundreds of millions betting on the Swiss franc and Brazilian assets.

=== Cryptocurrency ===
Novogratz founded Galaxy Investment Partners, a cryptocurrency investment firm, in 2018. Originally scheduled to start his Galaxy Digital Assets Fund on December 15, 2017, he shelved plans because he "didn't like market conditions."

Galaxy Digital Holdings Ltd. is one of the few cryptocurrency companies required to publish financial results. In the first nine months of 2018, the company lost $136 million in cryptocurrency trading. In 2017, Galaxy Digital contributed to an $80 million funding round for technology company Bitfury.

Galaxy losses widened to 554 million in Q2 of 2022 following a 182 million dollar loss for the past year.

He stated in 2017 that 20% of his net worth was in Bitcoin and Ethereum. He says he made $250 million from crypto currency from 2016-2017. At a 2022 cryptocurrency conference, Novogratz boasted that he was "only guy in the world that’s got both a Bitcoin tattoo and a Luna tattoo". A few weeks later, UST(the algorithmic Terra Luna stable coin), which claimed that it was pegged to the US Dollar, lost nearly all of its value.

=== Other positions ===
New York Governor David Paterson appointed Novogratz to sit on the Hudson River Park Trust's board of directors in 2010. He is a member of the Federal Reserve Bank of New York's Investment Advisory Committee on Financial Markets. Novogratz is the chairman and founder of Beat the Streets, a non-profit organization which fosters the sport of wrestling in New York City public schools. He is on the boards of the Acumen Fund, NYU Langone Medical Center, Princeton Varsity Club, Boards of Creative Alternatives of New York, PAX, the School for Strings, and The Jazz Foundation of America. He founded and is the chairman of the School for Strings. He is also the honorary chairman of USA Wrestling Foundation and the chairman of The Friends of the Hudson River Park. In October 2015, Novogratz retired from Fortress Investments.

== Personal life ==
In 2006, he bought Robert De Niro's $12.25 million duplex in Manhattan's Tribeca neighborhood. When he moved into De Niro's former residence, Mickey Rourke moved into Novogratz' former Meatpacking district residence. He and his wife Dora "Sukey" Caceres have four children. They also own a home in Amagansett, outside New York City.

He has been a booster for the U.S. National Wrestling Team and an official spokesman for USA Wrestling. He was named the 2010 USA Wrestling Man of the Year and an Outstanding American by the National Wrestling Hall of Fame in 2007. When the International Olympic Committee cut Olympic Wrestling from the 2020 Summer Games, he campaigned for the sport's return.

=== Net worth ===
In September 2007, Novogratz was listed at #317 on the Forbes 400 with a net worth of $1.5 billion. He was ranked 962 on the March 2008 Forbes list of world billionaires with a net worth of $1.2 billion. The same year, he became a member of Kappa Beta Phi, a Wall Street "secret society" made up of wealthy financial executives. By 2012, after the decline of Fortress' stock price, his net worth had shrunk to $500 million. He supports Democratic political interests. He is also Governing Board Chair of The Bail Project. As of 2021, he owned $4.8 billion of cryptocurrency. That year, he appeared as himself in an episode of Billions. As of January 2026, his net worth is $7 billion, according to Forbes.

=== Family ===
His sister Jacqueline Novogratz is founder and CEO of Acumen Fund, while his brother Robert Novogratz is a designer who has been profiled in the Bravo television series 9 by Design. Another brother, John Novogratz, is a senior managing partner at Millennium Partners.
