= 1958 All-Eastern football team =

American all-star college football team

The 1958 All-Eastern football team consists of American football players chosen by various selectors as the best players at each position among the Eastern colleges and universities during the 1958 college football season.

== Backs ==
- Chuck Zimmerman, Syracuse (AP-1 [qb]; UPI-1)
- Bob Anderson, Army (AP-1; UPI-1)
- Bill Austin, Rutgers (AP-1; UPI-1)
- Pete Dawkins, Army (AP-1; UPI-1)
- Tom Greene, Holy Cross (AP-2; UPI-2)
- Joe Tranchini, Navy (AP-3; UPI-2)
- Jake Crouthamel, Dartmouth (AP-2)
- Thomas Stephens, Syracuse (AP-2)
- Paul Choquette, Brown (AP-2)
- Don Allard, Boston College (UPI-2)
- Frank Finney, Brown (UPI-2)
- Dick Haley, Pitt (AP-3)
- Gerhard Schwedes, Syracuse (AP-3)
- Joe Matalavage, Navy (AP-3)

== Ends ==
- Gene O'Pella, Villanova (AP-1; UPI-1)
- Jim Kenney, Boston University (AP-1; UPI-1)
- Bill Carpenter, Army (AP-3; UPI-2)
- Art Gob, Pittsburgh (AP-2)
- Barney Berlinger, Penn (AP-2)
- Maury Schleicher, Penn State (UPI-2)
- Bob Simms, Rutgers (AP-3)

== Tackles ==
- Ron Luciano, Syracuse (AP-1; UPI-1)
- Bob Novogratz, Army (AP-1)
- Steve Bennett, Boston College (UPI-1)
- Bob Shaunessy, Harvard (AP-2; UPI-2)
- Maurice Hilliard, Army (AP-2; UPI-2)
- Charlie Janerette, Penn State (AP-3)
- Ed Savitsky, Cornell (AP-3)

== Guards ==
- John Guzik, Pitt (AP-1; UPI-1)
- Jim Healy, Holy Cross (AP-1; UPI-2)
- Bob Novogratz, Army (UPI-1)
- George Fritzinger, Navy (AP-2; UPI-2)
- Alvin Krutsch, Dartmouth (AP-2)
- Roger Davis, Syracuse (AP-3)
- Larry Muchiatti, Rutgers (AP-3)

== Center ==
- Steve Garban, Penn State (AP-1; UPI-1)
- Don Crafton, Pitt (AP-2)
- Don Warburton, Brown (UPI-2)
- Milan Moncilovich, Navy (AP-3)

== Key ==
- AP = Associated Press
- UPI = United Press International

== See also ==
- 1958 College Football All-America Team
