= Galaxy Digital (company) =

American digital asset and data center infrastructure company

Galaxy Digital Inc.
- Type: Public
- Traded as: Nasdaq: GLXY
- Industry: Financial services Investment management Cryptocurrency; Data center infrastructure
- Founded: February 2018; 8 years ago
- Founders: Michael Novogratz
- Headquarters: New York City, New York, U.S.
- Key people: Michael Novogratz (CEO)
- Products: Digital asset trading, lending, asset management, staking, custody, tokenization, data center infrastructure
- AUM: US$7.1 billion in combined assets under management and assets under stake (June 30, 2026)
- Total assets: US$10.8 billion (June 30, 2026)
- Website: galaxy.com

Galaxy Digital Inc., doing business as Galaxy, is an American financial services and infrastructure company headquartered in New York City. The company focuses on digital assets, cryptocurrency, blockchain infrastructure, and artificial intelligence and high-performance computing data center infrastructure. Its digital asset businesses include over-the-counter trading, lending, investment banking, asset management, staking, custody, and tokenization technology. It was founded in 2018 by billionaire Michael Novogratz.

== Background ==
In February 2018, Galaxy was founded by Fortress Investment Group co-founder Michael Novogratz. Galaxy Digital went public on the Toronto Stock Exchange in 2018.

Galaxy Digital Holdings Ltd. was one of the few cryptocurrency companies required to publish financial results. In the first nine months of 2018, the company lost $136 million in cryptocurrency trading. In November 2018, Galaxy participated in an $80 million funding round for blockchain technology company Bitfury.

During the bankruptcy proceedings of FTX, Forbes reported that a Galaxy-managed fund could realize more than $1 billion in gains from discounted Solana tokens purchased from the FTX estate.

In May 2025, Galaxy completed a reorganization and its Class A common stock began trading on the Nasdaq Global Select Market under the ticker symbol GLXY. Galaxy completed its voluntary delisting from the Toronto Stock Exchange in March 2026, consolidating its public listing on Nasdaq as its sole exchange.

== Business ==
Galaxy reports its activities across three segments: Digital Assets, Data Centers, and Treasury and Corporate.

For the second quarter of 2026, Galaxy reported a net loss of $85 million, adjusted gross profit of $43 million, and adjusted EBITDA of negative $77 million. The company ended the quarter with $10.8 billion in total assets, $2.7 billion in total equity, and $2.5 billion in cash and stablecoins. Its Digital Assets and Data Centers operating businesses generated a combined $86 million of adjusted gross profit and $1 million of adjusted EBITDA.

=== Digital assets ===
Galaxy's Digital Assets segment includes its Global Markets business and its Asset Management & Infrastructure Solutions business. The company describes the segment as serving institutional clients through trading, lending, brokerage, investment banking, asset management, staking, self-custody, and tokenization technology.

Galaxy Global Markets provides institutional access to over-the-counter and electronic trading, spot and derivatives execution, lending, structured products, and investment banking services. Galaxy's investment banking business advises digital-asset companies on mergers and acquisitions, capital raising, and capital markets transactions. As of March 31, 2026, Galaxy reported 1,691 trading counterparties and an average loan book of approximately $1.4 billion.

During the second quarter of 2026, Global Markets generated $49 million of adjusted gross profit, compared with $31 million in the first quarter. Galaxy reported 1,741 trading counterparties, an average loan book of approximately $1.44 billion, and a 7% sequential decline in its trading volumes during a period in which broader industry volumes declined by more than ten percent. Galaxy also launched the Galaxy Onchain Financing Rate (GOFR), a managed lending service that provides institutional clients access to onchain credit markets through Galaxy as a single counterparty. Management said GOFR had generated nearly $300 million of loan originations by August 2026. The company also introduced Galaxy Curator, an institutional vault-curation service built on Morpho and integrated with Fireblocks, which management said made curated onchain yield strategies available to more than 2,400 institutional clients.

Galaxy Asset Management provides exchange-traded product strategies, alternative investment strategies, separately managed accounts, venture capital funds, hedge funds, and opportunistic mandates focused on digital assets, blockchain infrastructure, and adjacent emerging technologies. As of March 31, 2026, Galaxy reported approximately $5.0 billion in assets under management, $3.2 billion in assets under stake, and approximately $9 billion in assets on platform, a broader metric that included assets under management, assets under stake, and certain assets managed by a commodity pool operator within Galaxy's Global Markets division, with some overlap among categories.

As of June 30, 2026, Galaxy reported approximately $1.81 billion in exchange-traded products, $2.55 billion in alternative strategies, and $2.79 billion in assets under stake. The company reported $7.1 billion in combined assets under management and assets under stake, with approximately $733 million included in both categories. During the quarter, Galaxy launched the Galaxy Fintech Fund, a long-short equity hedge fund focused on the digital-asset transformation of financial services, with more than $100 million of assets at launch. Galaxy and State Street Investment Management also launched the State Street Galaxy Onchain Liquidity Sweep Fund (SWEEP), a tokenized private liquidity fund designed to support 24-hour onchain cash management through stablecoins, subject to stablecoin availability in the fund's portfolio.

Galaxy's Infrastructure Solutions business includes staking, tokenization, and custodial technology. Galaxy's staking platform supports native staking, liquid staking, staking APIs, and the use of staked assets as collateral or working capital. The company reported $3.2 billion of assets under stake as of March 31, 2026, and said its institutional staking infrastructure included globally distributed validators, slashing protection, custody integrations, and API-based reporting for institutional clients. In December 2025, Galaxy acquired Alluvial Finance and became the development company for Liquid Collective, an enterprise-grade liquid staking protocol. In April 2026, BlackRock selected Galaxy as one of the approved validators for the iShares Staked Ethereum Trust ETF, BlackRock's first rewards-generating crypto exchange-traded product.

In the second quarter of 2026, Galaxy entered a multi-year agreement with BNY to help develop BNY's institutional digital-asset infrastructure, including staking support for BNY's Digital Asset Custody platform. Galaxy also became a design partner across BNY's broader digital infrastructure, and management said a team of Galaxy engineers had been deployed to work on the engagement. During the same period, Morgan Stanley Wealth Management selected Galaxy to provide staking infrastructure for two digital-asset exchange-traded products. Galaxy also announced a referral arrangement under which Morgan Stanley Wealth clients could lend digital assets to Galaxy and receive in-kind spot cryptocurrency exchange-traded products.

Galaxy's tokenization business uses GK8, its institutional custody and tokenization platform, to issue, manage, and distribute tokenized financial assets. Galaxy describes its tokenization services as including onchain advisory, tokenization technology, and placement services for institutional tokenized products, including structured products, funds, real-world assets, and equities. In January 2026, Galaxy announced the initial closing of Galaxy CLO 2025-1, a tokenized collateralized loan obligation on the Avalanche blockchain, with approximately $75 million financed at launch and a $50 million anchor allocation from Grove. In September 2025, Galaxy and Superstate announced the tokenization of Galaxy's Class A common stock on the Solana blockchain, with Superstate acting as digital transfer agent for approved investors.

In June 2026, the U.S. Securities and Exchange Commission proposed amendments to rescind Regulation NMS Rule 611, the trade-through rule for national market system stocks, and Rule 610(e), which restricts locking and crossing quotations. Galaxy's head of research, Alex Thorn, argued that the proposal could remove a major market-structure obstacle for tokenized U.S. equities trading in decentralized finance, because automated market makers execute against liquidity pools and bonding curves rather than routing orders across exchanges to comply with protected quotations. The development was relevant to Galaxy's tokenization business, which uses its GK8 platform to tokenize institutional financial assets and has included tokenized structured products, real-world assets, and Galaxy's own Class A common stock.

Galaxy has presented these services as part of a strategy to connect traditional financial institutions with blockchain-based market infrastructure. In its 2025 annual report, Novogratz wrote that the future digital economy would be built on "regulated rails, trusted custody solutions, and tokenization platforms," and said that infrastructure and regulation were converging to bring institutional capital onchain. During Galaxy's first-quarter 2026 earnings call, management said that large financial institutions were preparing to move onto blockchain-based rails and would require wallet and custody technology, trade settlement, clearing, collateral management, corporate treasury, and fund administration infrastructure. Galaxy said it was productizing its digital infrastructure platform into a business-to-business model through white-labeled solutions, bespoke integrations, and custom infrastructure for institutions.

During the second-quarter call, management said institutions were increasingly seeking to own and control core digital-asset technology rather than outsource it entirely. Galaxy said it had reorganized its infrastructure stack into modular components spanning custody, key management, staking, trading, settlement, and wallet infrastructure, allowing institutions to assemble systems around their own operating models. Management described the BNY engagement as an example of monetizing Galaxy's engineering and product capabilities through complex, multi-year strategic integrations.

=== Data centers ===
Galaxy's Data Centers segment develops high-performance computing infrastructure for artificial intelligence and other compute-intensive workloads. The company's principal data center project is the Helios campus in West Texas, which was originally used for bitcoin mining infrastructure and later converted toward AI and HPC data center use.

Galaxy has said that Helios has more than 3.4 gigawatts of total planned power capacity and, at 1.6 gigawatts of approved grid capacity, is projected to be the largest 100% front-of-the-meter data center campus in the world.

By August 2026, Galaxy reported more than 5.7 gigawatts of potential capacity across its Texas data center pipeline. This included more than 1.6 gigawatts of approved capacity at Helios, two additional one-gigawatt Helios expansion requests progressing through ERCOT's interconnection process, and the Merlin, Caspian, and Selene campuses.

In August 2025, Galaxy announced that it had closed a $1.4 billion project financing for the Helios campus. Under lease agreements with CoreWeave, Galaxy said the Helios campus covered 800 megawatts of gross power capacity and 526 megawatts of critical IT load across Phases I, II, and III. Galaxy described the CoreWeave lease arrangements as having a 15-year base term, two five-year extension options, more than $1 billion of anticipated average annual revenue, and approximately 90% anticipated average lease-level EBITDA margins, based on committed contractual terms and internal estimates.

In its second-quarter 2026 release, Galaxy raised its stated estimate for the CoreWeave leases to more than $1.2 billion of anticipated average annual revenue and anticipated average lease-level adjusted EBITDA margins above 90%, while retaining the 15-year base term and two five-year extension options.

In April 2026, Galaxy delivered its first data hall to CoreWeave and said it remained on budget and on schedule to deliver substantially all of the 133 megawatts of critical IT load under Phase I by the end of the second quarter of 2026. Galaxy also said Phase II greenfield development for 260 megawatts of additional critical IT load was underway and that data hall deliveries for Phase II were expected to begin in the first half of 2027.

Galaxy completed Phase I by the end of June 2026, delivering 200 megawatts of gross power and 133 megawatts of critical IT load to CoreWeave. The company said the phase was delivered on schedule and on budget, and that all Phase I capacity was revenue-generating by quarter end. The Data Centers segment generated $20 million of adjusted gross profit and $11 million of adjusted EBITDA during the second quarter. Galaxy expected Phase I to generate approximately $80 million of quarterly leasing revenue and a project-level adjusted EBITDA margin above 90% beginning in the third quarter of 2026.

HITT Contracting joined Phase II as general contractor and mobilized at Helios in April 2026. By August, earthwork was complete and structural foundation work was underway. Galaxy said Phase II would comprise eight data halls, with deliveries beginning in the second quarter of 2027, seven halls expected online by the end of 2027, and the final hall expected in early 2028. On July 28, 2026, Galaxy Helios Data Centers II LLC completed a $3.5 billion private offering of senior secured notes due 2031. Galaxy said the financing, structured at approximately 85% loan-to-cost and combined with equity already contributed, fully funded the remainder of Phase II. The third phase, representing another 200 megawatts of gross power and 133 megawatts of critical IT load, was expected to come online during 2028.

In January 2026, Galaxy announced that the Electric Reliability Council of Texas had approved an additional 830 megawatts of power capacity at Helios, bringing total approved gross power capacity at the campus to more than 1.6 gigawatts. In March 2026, ERCOT published PGRR145, titled "Batch Zero Process for Large Load Interconnections", a proposed transitional process for ERCOT to study the system-wide reliability impacts of qualifying large loads.

By August 2026, Galaxy said discussions with prospective tenants for the unleased 830 megawatts at Helios II continued to advance. The company had placed deposits and issued purchase orders for more than $180 million of long-lead electrical equipment, including main power transformers and switchgear, and said the WETT Pitchfork Switching Station was under construction to support energization of the capacity.

Beyond the approved Helios I and Helios II capacity, Galaxy identified two additional one-gigawatt interconnection points, Helios III and Helios IV. Galaxy submitted the required Batch Zero documents and attestations for Helios III and posted $50 million of financial security before ERCOT's July 24 deadline. Management expected Helios III to qualify as Batch Zero studied load, although the amount ultimately deliverable would depend on ERCOT's grid studies. Helios IV had not completed the same milestones and was expected to proceed through a subsequent ERCOT batch process on a later energization timeline.

In Galaxy's 2025 annual report, Novogratz described the Helios campus as the company's flagship AI data center campus and said the first 800 megawatts leased to CoreWeave represented more than $7.5 billion of capital investment. He further wrote that, combined with the newly approved 830 megawatts in a build-to-suit model, Helios likely represented more than $15 billion of long-term digital infrastructure investment, and described Galaxy's broader ambition as building and acquiring additional sites toward a multi-hundred-billion-dollar portfolio of digital infrastructure assets.

During Galaxy's first-quarter 2026 earnings call, president and chief investment officer Christopher Ferraro said the company had begun procuring critical infrastructure for the 830 megawatt Helios development, including main power transformers and circuit breakers. Ferraro also said Galaxy was evaluating a pipeline of U.S. data center opportunities, that several sites had progressed to letters of intent, and that the company expected to discuss a multi-campus portfolio within 2026. In the same call, Novogratz said new projects outside Helios were separate from the existing Helios expansion, while Ferraro said Galaxy was focused on both a multi-campus strategy and a multi-tenant strategy.

The second-quarter update provided the first named sites from that pipeline. Galaxy said it had added Merlin, Caspian, and Selene in Texas, increasing the company's potential data center power pipeline to more than 5.7 gigawatts. Management described the expansion as the beginning of a broader multi-campus development platform extending beyond Helios.

Galaxy has also made venture investments related to AI and high-performance computing infrastructure. In 2024, Galaxy Digital participated in Etched's $120 million Series A financing round. Etched is a semiconductor startup developing Sohu, an application-specific integrated circuit designed for transformer-model inference, with the company partnering with TSMC to fabricate its chips.

==== Project Merlin ====
In June 2026, the McGregor City Council approved plans and a land sale for Project Merlin, a proposed Galaxy data center campus in McGregor, Texas. The project was planned for approximately 499 to 500 acres in the city's industrial park, northeast of SpaceX's McGregor facility, and was described in city materials and local reporting as a more than $400 million capital investment.

The agenda for the June 22 special meeting listed a closed-session discussion regarding the sale of land to "Project Merlin" and an open-session item regarding the sale of approximately 499 acres to GXMG, LLC. Galaxy said the development would include several data center buildings, create more than 30 full-time jobs with average annual salaries above $60,000, and be privately funded, including power-related infrastructure and a company-funded electrical substation.

Galaxy said the site would use closed-loop cooling, with water use contractually capped at about 3,000 gallons per day per building and additional water infrastructure funded by Galaxy. Noise was also discussed during the council process. Galaxy's presentation said the project would be designed to keep sound levels at or below 65 decibels at the property boundary, and KWTX reported that the presentation referenced a baseline sound study conducted from May 28 to June 5, 2026. Blockspace reported that city officials identified the cooling-system chillers, rather than the servers, as the loudest equipment expected at the site.

At the council meeting, Galaxy representative Drew Luna also said that two SpaceX employees had helped Galaxy with a noise-reduction concept for the campus, according to contemporaneous accounts of the meeting. Industry publication Data Center Dynamics described the McGregor project as Galaxy's second Texas data center campus, following its Helios campus in Dickens County.

Subsequent to the quarter, Galaxy executed a development agreement to acquire the 500-acre site and said it had secured an initial utility agreement supporting approximately 74 megawatts of capacity. Galaxy expected the initial phase to begin energization in 2028, subject to execution of an interconnection agreement and a power-supply agreement with the local utility. The company said the campus could expand to approximately 500 megawatts as transmission infrastructure was upgraded and described Merlin as a prospective AI and inference campus serving customers across the Texas Triangle.

Project Merlin materially strengthened the evidence behind Galaxy's data center strategy. Management had already guided investors toward a multi-hundred billion dollar, multi-campus and multi-tenant infrastructure platform beyond Helios, and Novogratz had framed the company's long-term ambition as a portfolio of digital infrastructure assets diversified across sites, tenants, and technologies. The McGregor approval gave that strategy a concrete second-campus proof point: a large Texas site, local municipal backing, planned private infrastructure funding, and proximity to an established industrial technology corridor anchored by SpaceX. In that sense, Project Merlin was not an isolated land transaction; it was a visible execution marker against Galaxy's stated plan to scale from a single flagship campus into a broader AI/HPC infrastructure platform.

==== Caspian and Selene ====
In 2026, Galaxy acquired two additional Texas sites for proposed AI and HPC data center campuses, named Caspian and Selene. Galaxy said Caspian had approximately 700 megawatts of potential gross power capacity and Selene had approximately 900 megawatts, subject to ERCOT's interconnection process.

Management described Caspian as eligible for Batch Zero base-load classification because the site had completed interconnection agreements, relevant stability studies, electrical-equipment procurement, and identified financial commitments for transmission and distribution upgrades. Galaxy described Selene as eligible for Batch Zero studied-load classification after completing studies and attestations and posting approximately $45 million of financial security for its 900-megawatt request. Management said the actual capacity allocated to studied-load projects would remain subject to ERCOT's grid-planning process.

=== Custody and tokenization infrastructure ===
In February 2023, Galaxy completed its acquisition of substantially all assets of GK8, an institutional digital asset custody platform, for approximately $44 million. Galaxy said GK8's technology supported custody, staking, decentralized finance, tokenization, non-fungible token support, and trading services. Reuters reported in December 2022 that Galaxy had agreed to buy GK8 from Celsius Network following Celsius's Chapter 11 bankruptcy filing.

In June 2024, Galaxy announced the tokenization of the "Empress Caterina", a 1708 Stradivarius violin owned by Animoca Brands co-founder Yat Siu, using GK8's Tokenization Wizard. The tokenization was used in connection with a financing transaction between Siu and Galaxy and was recorded on the Ethereum blockchain as a non-fungible token. The Strad described the transaction as a high-profile case of tokenization involving a Stradivari violin valued at $9 million.

In September 2025, Galaxy and Superstate announced that Galaxy stockholders could tokenize and hold shares of Galaxy's Class A common stock on the Solana blockchain, with Superstate serving as digital transfer agent. Davis Polk, which advised Galaxy on the transaction, described it as the first tokenization of SEC-registered public equity directly on a major blockchain.

=== AllUnity ===
In December 2023, Galaxy, DWS Group, and Flow Traders announced plans to form AllUnity, a joint venture focused on issuing a fully collateralized euro-denominated stablecoin. The partners said AllUnity would combine DWS's portfolio management and product-structuring capabilities, Flow Traders' liquidity-provisioning and market-connectivity expertise, and Galaxy's digital-asset infrastructure.

In July 2025, AllUnity received an electronic money institution license from Germany's BaFin to issue EURAU, a euro-denominated stablecoin compliant with the European Union's Markets in Crypto-Assets Regulation (MiCAR). CoinDesk reported that AllUnity would introduce Germany's first regulated, euro-denominated stablecoin after receiving the BaFin license. AllUnity described EURAU as a 100% reserved euro stablecoin issued under a multi-bank reserve model, with proof-of-reserves and regulatory reporting, and said it was designed for 24/7 cross-border settlement, financial institutions, fintechs, corporate treasuries, and enterprise clients. Galaxy stated that GK8, its institutional custody and tokenization platform, provides tokenization and custodial infrastructure for EURAU.

AllUnity's business model is part of the broader reserve-backed stablecoin market, in which issuers can generate revenue from the assets held to back tokens. The economic scale of that model has been demonstrated by larger dollar-denominated issuers: Tether reported more than $10 billion of year-to-date net profit by the end of the third quarter of 2025, with more than $174 billion of USD₮ in circulation, while Circle reported $2.747 billion of total revenue and reserve income for full-year 2025 and $75.3 billion of USDC in circulation at year-end. Citi forecast in 2025 that global stablecoin supply could reach approximately $1.9 trillion by 2030 in its base case, with a high case of $4 trillion, and said banks could participate in the stablecoin ecosystem through issuance, custody, reserve management, treasury brokerage, and foreign-exchange services.

In 2025, AllUnity announced several infrastructure and institutional-adoption partnerships. BitGo partnered with AllUnity to provide wallet and custody infrastructure for EURAU. In November 2025, AllUnity and Deutsche Börse Group signed a memorandum of understanding to integrate AllUnity's euro-backed stablecoin into Deutsche Börse's financial market infrastructure, beginning with institutional-grade custody through Clearstream and later planned integration across Deutsche Börse Group's service portfolio. AllUnity also partnered with Projective Group to integrate EURAU into corporate treasury workflows through SAP Digital Currency Hub. By the end of 2025, AllUnity said EURAU had expanded beyond Ethereum to multiple layer-2 networks, including Optimism, Arbitrum, and Base, and had reached approximately $2 million to $4 million in daily trading volume and $20.44 million in total value locked.

Citi forecast in 2025 that global stablecoin issuance would reach approximately $1.9 trillion by 2030 in its base case. Stablecoins 2030 (PDF) (Report). Citi Global Perspectives & Solutions. September 2025. Using Citi’s 2030 base-case forecast of approximately $1.9 trillion in global stablecoin issuance, AllUnity’s addressable market can be framed as the euro-denominated portion of that future stablecoin supply. If euro stablecoins capture a portion of Citi’s projected global stablecoin market, the implied euro-stablecoin float would be approximately $95 billion, $190 billion, and $285 billion, respectively. This represents the broad issuance TAM for regulated euro stablecoins such as EURAU.

=== GalaxyOne ===
In October 2025, Galaxy launched GalaxyOne, a financial technology platform for U.S.-based individual investors seeking access to traditional and digital markets from a single application. In its Form 10-Q for the quarter ended March 31, 2026, Galaxy described GalaxyOne's core offerings as including access to a high-yield demand deposit account offered by Cross River Bank for U.S.-based depositors, a debt security issued by Galaxy Digital LP and guaranteed by Galaxy Digital Holdings LP for U.S. accredited investors, commission-free U.S. equities trading through DriveWealth, and crypto trading through Paxos.

At launch, Galaxy said GalaxyOne included four main products: Galaxy Premium Yield, GalaxyOne Cash, GalaxyOne Crypto, and GalaxyOne Brokerage. Galaxy Premium Yield was described as an investment note available only to U.S. accredited investors, with an 8.00% annual percentage yield at launch, interest accruing daily and paid monthly into the GalaxyOne Cash account, and yield generated by Galaxy's institutional lending business. GalaxyOne Cash was described as a high-yield cash deposit account insured through Cross River Bank up to applicable FDIC limits. GalaxyOne Crypto supported trading and transfers of bitcoin, ether, and solana, while GalaxyOne Brokerage provided commission-free trading of more than 2,000 U.S. stocks and exchange-traded funds, including individual brokerage accounts, traditional and Roth IRAs, fractional shares, and an optional stock lending program. Galaxy stated that Galaxy Premium Yield was not a bank deposit and was not FDIC insured, and that crypto assets on GalaxyOne were held through Paxos Trust Company and were not insured by the FDIC or SIPC.

GalaxyOne was originally developed under the name Fierce, a financial application software platform that Galaxy acquired in 2024. Galaxy said the platform was led by Zac Prince, a managing director at Galaxy, alongside the original Fierce development team, and that former Fierce chief executive Rob Cornish would support the platform as Galaxy's chief technology officer. CoinDesk described the launch as placing Galaxy in competition with retail financial platforms such as Robinhood and Coinbase by combining yield products with crypto, stocks, and ETF trading.

In March 2026, Galaxy launched Solana staking on GalaxyOne for eligible clients. The company said users could earn up to an estimated 6.50% in variable staking rewards on SOL, with no platform commission through December 31, 2026, and that GalaxyOne staking was powered by Galaxy's institutional validator infrastructure.

In April 2026, Galaxy announced GalaxyOne for Business, a new account type for U.S.-based limited liability companies, trusts, and other business entities. Galaxy said the business product would provide cash management, brokerage investments, digital asset management, and staking in a single treasury platform. The announced features included up to 8.00% yield on cash investments of up to $1 million for accredited U.S. business accounts through Galaxy Premium Yield, a commercial checking account with 3.25% APY at announcement, crypto trading and custody for BTC, ETH, SOL, and PAXG through Paxos, commission-free U.S. equities trading through FIN2 and DriveWealth, and SOL staking.

=== Venture investments ===
Galaxy's asset management business includes a venture capital franchise focused on early-stage companies in blockchain infrastructure and applications. In June 2025, Galaxy announced the final close of Galaxy Ventures Fund I with more than $175 million in commitments, exceeding its $150 million target. The fund focuses on early-stage companies developing infrastructure and applications for the onchain economy, including stablecoins, payments, tokenization, blockchain protocols, and software infrastructure.

== Research and media ==
Galaxy publishes digital asset research and produces Galaxy Brains, a podcast hosted by Alex Thorn, Galaxy's head of research. Galaxy describes the podcast as a weekly program covering trends and events across the cryptocurrency ecosystem, with Thorn and members of Galaxy's research team discussing developments in crypto and blockchain technology. Guests have included Anthony Pompliano, who appeared in episodes on the convergence of traditional and digital markets and on AI-generated financial research, and Michael Saylor, who appeared in episodes discussing bitcoin, MicroStrategy, digital banking, and the overlap of bitcoin and artificial intelligence.

== Notable transactions and market developments ==
In June 2024, Galaxy announced the tokenization of the "Empress Caterina", a 1708 Stradivarius violin owned by Animoca Brands co-founder Yat Siu. Galaxy said the violin was valued at approximately $9 million and had previously been owned by European royalty and nobility, including Catherine the Great. The tokenization was completed through GK8, Galaxy's institutional custody and tokenization platform, and recorded as a non-fungible token on the Ethereum blockchain for use in a financing transaction between Siu and Galaxy Global Markets; Galaxy stated that the tokenized instrument would not be available in a secondary market or public offering.

In July 2025, Galaxy announced that it had completed the sale of more than 80,000 bitcoin, valued at more than $9 billion, for a Satoshi-era investor. Galaxy described the transaction as one of the largest notional bitcoin transactions in the history of digital assets. CoinDesk reported that bitcoin rebounded after Galaxy confirmed completion of the sale.

In June 2026, Galaxy launched institutional over-the-counter prediction markets trading, offering clients access to non-sports event contracts on Kalshi and Polymarket through its Global Markets desk. Galaxy said it executed a $10 million trade with Arca on Kalshi at launch tied to the outcome of the proposed CLARITY Act.

== See also ==
- Pantera Capital
- Paradigm
- Polychain Capital
- Ribbit Capital
