= 13 Minutes (2021 film) =

2021 film directed by Lindsay Gossling

- Film poster
- Directed by: Lindsay Gossling
- Written by: Lindsay Gossling
- Story by: Travis Farncombe; Lindsay Gossling
- Produced by: Travis Farncombe; Lindsay Gossling; Karen Harnisch
- Starring: Trace Adkins; Thora Birch; Peter Facinelli; Anne Heche; Amy Smart; Paz Vega
- Cinematography: Steve Mason
- Edited by: Lisa Grootenboer
- Music by: Ariel Marx
- Production companies: Involving Pictures; Impact WX; Elevated Films
- Distributed by: Quiver Distribution
- Release date: October 29, 2021
- Running time: 108 minutes
- Countries: United States; Canada
- Language: English
- Box office: $67,413

13 Minutes is a 2021 American-Canadian disaster film written, directed and produced by Lindsay Gossling, in her feature debut film. It stars Trace Adkins, Thora Birch, Peter Facinelli, Anne Heche, Amy Smart and Paz Vega.

== Plot ==
Four families in the fictional Oklahoma town of Minninnewah, whose lives are intertwined, wrestle with undocumented immigration, closeted homosexuality, abortion, and other issues before a massive tornado wipes out the town, leaving death and destruction in its path. Following the devastation, the community deals with death and new beginnings.

== Cast ==
- Trace Adkins as Rick
- Yancey Arias as Carlos
- Thora Birch as Jess
- Tokala Black Elk as Steve
- Peter Facinelli as Brad
- Anne Heche as Tammy
- Shaylee Mansfield as Peyton
- Will Peltz as Luke
- Davi Santos as Daniel
- Amy Smart as Kim
- Laura Spencer as Vicky
- Sofia Vassilieva as Maddy
- Paz Vega as Ana
- Allyson Cristofaro as Olivia
- Gabriel Jarret as Greg
- James Austin Kerr as Eric

== Production and themes ==
The title references "the short time frame residents have to seek shelter" when a tornado is detected. The film "follows four different families who are all dealing with their own issues" before the disaster strikes, and through them weaves in social issues such as undocumented immigrants, abortion, and religious intolerance. The film was filmed in Oklahoma.

== Release ==
The film had a first limited theatrical release on October 29, 2021 by Quiver, then in the United Arab Emirates on November 11, 2021 and in Portugal on January 13, 2022. It was released on VOD by Quiver on December 7, 2021, and by Signature Entertainment on January 17, 2022.

== Reception ==
=== Box office ===
13 Minutes grossed $45,653 in the United Arab Emirates and $21,760 in Portugal, for a worldwide total of $67,413.

=== Critical response ===
On review aggregator Rotten Tomatoes, the film holds an approval rating of 27% based on 22 reviews, with an average rating of 4.3/10. On Metacritic, the film holds a score of 40 out of 100, based on 5 critics, indicating "mixed or average" reviews. The Guardian gave the film a middling review, as it found the plot weakened by convenient turns of fate against negatively portrayed characters. Rex Reed for The New York Observer gave an overall positive review, stating that "the film is sometimes contrived in its efforts to keep the various plot lines connected," but "benefits substantially from the compelling contributions of a likable cast."
