= Francois Klark =

South African-Canadian singer and songwriter

Francois Klark is a South African-Canadian pop singer and songwriter. He is most noted for his 2022 album Adventure Book, which was a shortlisted Juno Award nominee for Adult Contemporary Album of the Year at the Juno Awards of 2023.

Klark was born in Rundu, Namibia, to South African parents, and raised principally in Potchefstroom, and moved to Canada in 2004 to study music at Humber College. A recipient of the college's Oscar Peterson Award for Outstanding Achievement in Music, he released his debut album Love in 2018, and subsequently performed with artists such as Jon Bellion, Ginuwine, Shawn Desman and Karl Wolf.

Klark's song "Always" was featured in the 2020 Netflix film Feel the Beat. In 2024, Klark's song "The Only One" was featured in episode 4 ("Date Night") of the seventh season of ABC's The Good Doctor.
