= Shaylee Mansfield =

American actress (born 2009)

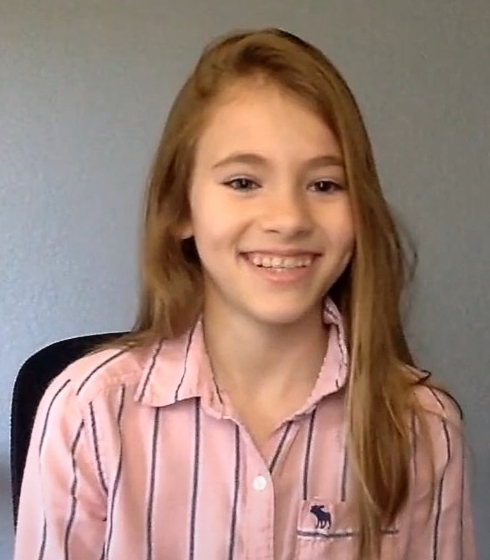
- Mansfield in 2020
- Born: April 6, 2009 (age 17); Burbank, California, U.S.
- Occupation: Actress
- Years active: 2013–present
- Website: shayleemansfield.com

Shaylee Mansfield (born April 6, 2009) is an American actress. Mansfield, who is deaf, first gained recognition by making YouTube videos in which she told Christmas stories in American Sign Language. Mansfield appeared in an "Unforgettable Stories" video (Note: As part of the "Unforgettable Happens Here" campaign, Disney released videos about families' experiences at Disney Parks.) advertisement by Disney Parks, in which she met Minnie Mouse, who was learning sign language at Walt Disney World. The video quickly went viral and became one of Disney's most-watched advertisements.

Mansfield made her acting debut in 2019 in Disney's Noelle. The following year, her request for automatic captioning on Instagram drew attention from several media publications and became popular on Twitter. She received further recognition for her roles in the films Feel the Beat (2020) and 13 Minutes (2021). In 2022, for her performance on Madagascar: A Little Wild, Mansfield possibly became the first deaf actress to be credited alongside the "audible" voice actors for her "sign over" performance in an animated production.

== Life and career ==
=== 2009–2018: Early life and YouTube videos ===
Shaylee Mansfield was born deaf in Burbank, California, in 2009. Her parents—former actor Sheena McFeely and Manny Johnson—are also deaf and run ASL Nook, a website and YouTube channel that teaches American Sign Language (ASL). Mansfield has a younger sister, Ivy, who is not deaf.

Mansfield appeared on ASL Nook from 2013 until 2019. She began signing Christmas stories on the channel at age four with The Nightmare Before Christmas. At five, she performed How the Grinch Stole Christmas!; E! stated: "We can't remember the last time a holiday story made us smile so much ... mostly because [Mansfield] is so into how she tells the story. She is so expressive with her sign-language and facial expressions." In 2015, she enacted Rudolph the Red-Nosed Reindeer. HuffPost called her 2016 retelling of The Polar Express "beautiful ... like you've never seen before".

At a Disney park in 2013, Mansfield met a staff member dressed as Tinker Bell who could sign. Three years later, due to this event, Disney flew the Mansfield family to Disneyland. At the park, the family filmed an "Unforgettable Stories" advertisement, in which they met an actor dressed as Minnie Mouse who had recently begun learning sign language. The video went viral, garnering, as of April 2016, 11 million views and becoming the second-most-watched of Disney's advertisements. Adweek highlighted its inclusivity as a major factor in its success. The Mansfields also appeared alongside two other predominantly deaf families in the documentary film Born This Way Presents: Deaf Out Loud, which aired on A&E on September 12, 2018. The New York Times's Margaret Lyons described it as earnest and the families featured as "incredibly compelling, thoughtful and telegenic".

=== 2019–present: Acting debut ===
In 2019, Mansfield made her acting debut as Michelle, a homeless, deaf girl, in the Disney+ film Noelle. Despite the film's mixed reception, the role was, according to Variety, helpful to Mansfield's career. In July 2019, Netflix announced Mansfield had been cast in its film Feel the Beat, which received ambivalent reviews. In 2021, Mansfield appeared as Peyton, the deaf daughter of Kim (Amy Smart) and Brad (Peter Facinelli), in 13 Minutes; The Hollywood Reporter said she had a "very natural screen presence".

Mansfield met Delbert and Jevon Whetter, deaf consultants for the animated series Madagascar: A Little Wild, at a panel for RespectAbility; following the panel, Mansfield's mother asked whether the show needed a deaf actor. After having a familiarization meeting with DreamWorks, Mansfield was quickly offered a role in the series. Because of the earlier relationship between Mansfield and the Whetters, Mansfield did not go through the regular casting procedure for A Little Wild. The show's original intent to depict a boy was adjusted to a girl, who was named and modeled after Mansfield. She was able to choose her own interpreter, which she stated enabled her to "focus on delivering [her] best performance". The animators based the character's actions on her signs using a video reference. Due to the COVID-19 pandemic, Mansfield was required to work via Zoom. Jevon said: "We had to really slow it down to be extremely clear, and give various angles of the lines so that the animators can see where the hand shapes and hand movements should be". Mansfield made a guest appearance in the episode "Gloria's Got 'Em All", which was released on streaming services Hulu and Peacock on January 13, 2022; she is credited for her signed performance in the episode alongside the voice actors, which may be the first such credit for a deaf actor.

In 2023, Mansfield portrayed Ollie Nicoletti in ABC's drama series The Company You Keep. In a review, Richard Roeper of the Chicago Sun-Times praised her performance as "instantly endearing". The show was canceled after one season.

== Advocacy ==
During her YouTube career, Mansfield aimed to encourage children and families to learn ASL. Through her performances as an actor, she works to demonstrate authenticity to the deaf community and raise awareness about ASL. She uses her social media as a platform to teach others about sign language and raise awareness. In April 2020, during the COVID-19 pandemic, Mansfield posted a video on Twitter criticizing Instagram for a lack of captioning; in it, she said she and over 400 million other deaf or hard-of-hearing people are unable to understand videos with sound. Her video was liked and retweeted thousands of times. Mansfield asked Instagram's chief executive officer, Adam Mosseri, to add automatic captioning to the network. In May 2021, Instagram released a sticker (Note: On Instagram, stickers are customizable items that can be added to Stories; they include the weather, the day of the week, holidays, quizzes, and polls.) that automatically transcribes speech in Instagram Stories. (Note: Instagram Stories are collections of pictures, video, and texts that form a slideshow gallery, which is available for 24 hours.)

== Filmography ==
Filmography of Shaylee Mansfield
Year	Title	Role	Notes	Ref.
2018	Born This Way: Deaf Out Loud	Herself	Documentary; television film	
2019	This Close	Margaret	Episode: "Frog of Truth"	
2019	Noelle	Michelle	Streaming film	
2020	Bunk'd	Willow	Episode: "My Fairy Lady"	
2020	Feel the Beat	Zuzu	Streaming film	
2021	13 Minutes	Peyton		
2022	Madagascar: A Little Wild	Shaylee ("sign over")	Episode: "Gloria's Got 'Em All"; streaming series	
2023	The Company You Keep	Ollie Nicoletti	7 episodes	
