= Tom Greene (American football) =

American football player (born 1937)

No. 14
- Position: Quarterback/Punter

Personal information
- Born: July 15, 1937; Washington, D.C., US
- Died: October 19, 2023 (aged 86); Baltimore, Maryland, US

Career information
- College: Holy Cross
- NFL draft: 1959: undrafted

Career history
- Boston Patriots (1960); Dallas Texans (1961)

Awards and highlights
- Third-team All-American (1958); First-team All-Eastern (1957); Second-team All-Eastern (1958)

Career NFL statistics
- Passing attempts: 63
- Passing completions: 27
- Completion percentage: 42.9%
- TD–INT: 1–6
- Passing yards: 251
- Passer rating: 20.1
- Punting yards: 2,273
- Stats at Pro Football Reference

Thomas Winand Greene (July 15, 1937 – October 19, 2023) was an American professional football player who was a quarterback and punter in the American Football League (AFL). He played for the Boston Patriots and Dallas Texans. He played college football for the Holy Cross Crusaders.

== AFL career statistics ==
Legend
**Bold**	Career high

Year	Team	Games			Passing									Rushing					Punting					Sacked		Fum
Year	Team	GP	GS	Record	Cmp	Att	Pct	Yds	Y/A	Lng	TD	Int	Rtg	Att	Yds	Y/A	Lng	TD	Pnt	Yds	Y/P	Lng	Blck	Sck	SckY	Fum
1960	BOS	**10**	**2**	**1–1**	**27**	**63**	**42.9**	**251**	**4.0**	**31**	**1**	**6**	**20.1**	**7**	**44**	**6.3**	**21**	**0**	**61**	**2,273**	**37.3**	**66**	**1**	**9**	**71**	**2**
1961	DTX	1	0	—	0	0	—	0	—	0	0	0	—	0	0	—	0	0	0	0	—	0	0	0	0	0
Career		11	2	1–1	27	63	42.9	251	4.0	31	1	6	20.1	7	44	6.3	21	0	61	2,273	37.3	66	1	9	71	2
