= Patient capital =

Long-term investment without expectation of quick profit

Patient capital is another name for long-term capital. With patient capital, the investor is willing to make a financial investment in a business with no expectation of turning a quick profit. Instead, the investor is willing to forgo an immediate return in anticipation of more substantial returns down the road. Prominent examples of patient capital includes pensions, sovereign wealth funds, and university endowments. Governments with access to patient capital may have greater maneuverability in formulating domestic economic policies.

Although patient capital can be considered a traditional investment instrument, it has gained new life with the rise in environmentally and socially responsible enterprises. In these cases, it may take the form of equity, debt, loan guarantees or other financial instruments, and is characterized by:

- Willingness to forgo maximum financial returns for social impact, and an unwillingness to sacrifice the interests of the end customer for the sake of shareholders
- Greater tolerance for risk than traditional investment capital
- Longer time horizons for return of capital
- Intensive support of management as they grow their enterprise

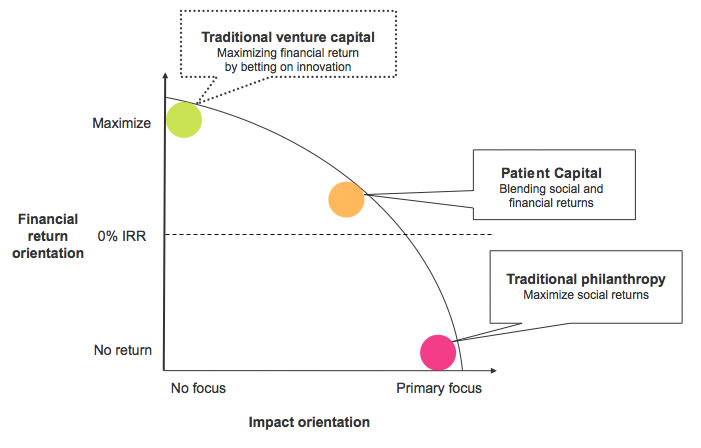
Patient capital

The source of capital may be philanthropy, investment capital, or some combination of the two. Patient capital is not a grant, it is an investment intended to return its principal plus (often below market-rate) interest. It does not seek to maximize financial returns to investors; it seeks to maximize social impact and to catalyze the creation of markets to combat poverty. On the spectrum of capital available to both non-profits and for-profits, patient capital sits between traditional venture capital and traditional philanthropy, between development aid and foreign direct investment.

Thomas Friedman of The New York Times describes patient capital as having "all the discipline of venture capital – demanding a return, and therefore rigor in how it is deployed – but expecting a return that is more in the 5 to 10 percent range, rather than the 35 percent that venture capitalists look for." Jacqueline Novogratz of Acumen adds that patient capital "takes the best of the markets as well as philanthropy and aid. Patient capital is money invested in entrepreneurs building companies and organizations that solve tough problems like healthcare, water, housing, alternative energy."

The success of the platform company business model is in large part due to patient capital, as investors are prepared to accept long periods without profit in the hopes that the platform company obtains a dominant market position.
