= Wolfgang Novogratz =

American actor

- Born: Wolfgang Francis Novogratz; May 9, 1997 (age 28); New York City, U.S.
- Occupations: Actor; model; television personality
- Years active: 2010–present
- Relatives: Michael Novogratz (uncle); Jacqueline Novogratz (aunt)

Wolfgang Francis Novogratz (born May 9, 1997) is an American actor and model. He has appeared in the Netflix films Sierra Burgess Is a Loser (2018), The Last Summer (2019), The Half of It (2020) and Feel the Beat (2020). He also appeared in the film Yes, God, Yes (2019).

== Early life ==
Novogratz was born on May 9, 1997, to interior-design couple Robert and Cortney Novogratz from Bravo's 9 By Design. He has six younger siblings, Bellamy (1998), Tallulah (1998), Breaker (2000), Five (2005), Holleder (2005), and Major (2009), and is the nephew of Wall Street billionaire Mike Novogratz. He was born and raised in Manhattan.

Novogratz played high school basketball at Harvard-Westlake School in Los Angeles, leading the Wolverines to a CIF Division IV state championship as a senior.

== Filmography ==
=== Film ===
Year	Title	Role	Notes
2017	Buckets	Young Guy	Short film
2018	Assassination Nation	Dave	
2018	Sierra Burgess Is a Loser	Drew	
2019	Yes, God, Yes	Chris	
2019	The Last Summer	Foster	
2020	The Half of It	Trig	
2020	Feel the Beat	Nick	
2024	Tarot	Lucas	

=== Television ===
Year	Title	Role	Notes
2010	9 By Design	Himself	
2011–2012	Home by Novogratz	Himself	
2018	Grown-ish	Chad	
2020	Group Chat with Annie & Jayden	Himself	
