= Rocky Belk =

American football player (1960–2010)

No. 88
- Position: Wide receiver

Personal information
- Born: June 20, 1960; Alexandria, Virginia, U.S.
- Died: July 15, 2010 (aged 50); Arlington, Virginia, U.S.
- Listed height: 6 ft 0 in (1.83 m)
- Listed weight: 187 lb (85 kg)

Career information
- High school: Fort Hunt
- College: Miami (FL) (1979–1982)
- NFL draft: 1983: 7th round, 176th overall pick

Career history
- Cleveland Browns (1983); Los Angeles Raiders (1985)*
- * Offseason or practice squad member only

Awards and highlights
- Second-team All-South Independent (1982)

Career NFL statistics
- Receptions: 5
- Receiving yards: 141
- Receiving touchdowns: 2
- Stats at Pro Football Reference

Anthony Lovett "Rocky" Belk (June 20, 1960 – July 15, 2010) was an American professional football wide receiver who played one season with the Cleveland Browns of the National Football League (NFL). He was selected by the Browns in the seventh round of the 1983 NFL draft after playing college football at the University of Miami.

== Early life and college ==
Anthony Lovett Belk was born on June 20, 1960, in Alexandria, Virginia. He attended Fort Hunt High School in Alexandria.

Belk played college football for the Miami Hurricanes of the University of Miami from 1979 to 1982. He was a three-year letterman from 1980 to 1982. He did not catch any passes in 1979 but made four carries for six yards. Belk recorded eight passes for 175 yards and one touchdown in 1980. In 1981, he caught 15 passes for 451 yards and three touchdowns while also returning two kicks for 64 yards. He recorded 35 receptions for 645 yards and three touchdowns his senior year in 1982, earning Associated Press second-team All-South Independent honors.

== Professional career ==
Belk was selected by the Cleveland Browns in the seventh round, with 76th overall pick, of the 1983 NFL draft. He officially signed with the team on May 11. He played in ten games for the Browns during the 1983 season, catching five passes for 141 yards and two touchdowns. Belk was released on August 27, 1984.

Belk signed a futures contract with the Los Angeles Raiders on November 10, 1984. He was released in 1985.

== Personal life ==
Belk died after a lengthy illness on July 15, 2010, in Arlington, Virginia.
