= The Last Summer (2019 film) =

2019 American rom-com film by William Bindley

- Official poster
- Directed by: William Bindley
- Written by: Scott Bindley; William Bindley
- Produced by: Mike Karz; William Bindley; Wayne Rice
- Starring: KJ Apa; Maia Mitchell; Jacob Latimore; Halston Sage; Sosie Bacon; Wolfgang Novogratz; Gabrielle Anwar; Ed Quinn; Jacob McCarth; Mario Revolori; Gage Golightly; Norman Johnson, Jr.; Tyler Posey
- Cinematography: Luca Del Puppo
- Edited by: William Hoy; Melissa Remenarich-Aperlo
- Music by: Ryan Miller
- Production company: Gulfstream Pictures
- Distributed by: Netflix
- Release date: May 3, 2019 (United States)
- Running time: 110 minutes
- Country: United States
- Language: English

The Last Summer is a 2019 American romantic comedy film directed by William Bindley from a screenplay he co-wrote with Scott Bindley. The film stars KJ Apa, Maia Mitchell, Jacob Latimore, Halston Sage and Tyler Posey. It was released on May 3, 2019, by Netflix.

== Plot ==
An interconnected group of recent high school grads navigates through personal issues while enjoying their "last summer" before moving on to college.

=== Griffin and Phoebe ===
Griffin Hourigan, a prep school grad, is preparing to enter Columbia University, thanks to nepotism (his father), despite wanting to attend Berklee College of Music. At a party, he reencounters Phoebe Fisher, a childhood friend he has always had a crush on. Learning that she is making a documentary, he volunteers to help.

He asks her out, but she initially declines, explaining she must spend the summer focusing on making her film. They view a clip from the documentary where a couple plan for a long-distance relationship, and both predict it won't last. He helps her mix the audio, becoming closer, and soon begin dating.

Phoebe, wanting to attend NYU, explains she has to win the festival to pay for school. She also encourages him to follow his passion for music. Meanwhile, Griffin learns that his father is having an affair with Phoebe's single mother. He doesn't tell her until after Griffin's mother finds out and ends it. A devastated Phoebe blames Griffin for saying nothing, breaking it off.

Apologizing directly to Phoebe's mother, he then sends Phoebe her favorite takeout and she invites him to the documentary premiere. It is well-received, and Phoebe is able to attend NYU. They reconcile, and he has decided to follow his dreams and attend Berklee. As they won't both be attending school in NYC, they say they'll try long-distance, then jokingly say it is doomed.

=== Erin and Alec ===
Erin and Alec, a high school power couple for two years, agree to break up before leaving for college. Though they plan to be respectful even while apart, Erin is shocked when Alec quickly falls under the spell of Paige Wilcox, a popular, vapid classmate who immediately snatches him up. Though Erin secretly misses Alec, she tries to move on, focusing on her thankless job as a personal assistant.

Erin attends a Cubs game with best friend Audrey, who gets baseline tickets from her employer. During the game, rookie Ricky Santos catches a ball onto her lap and later asks her out. Charmed by the friendly and homey Ricky, they begin dating. Alec breaks up with dull-witted Paige and unsuccessfully tries to win Erin back, becoming jealous when he learns of her relationship with Ricky.

Though Ricky tells Erin that they are exclusive, surprising him at home she encounters his ex. He hastily explains their situation is "complicated." Erin breaks up with him, regretting leaving Alec. Some time later, Alec comes to her send off party; they decide to be friends again, moments before kissing and possibly renewing their relationship.

=== Audrey ===
Audrey, a working-class student, is rejected by all but one of her college choices, as her grades were average as she needed to work while in school. Disappointed, she decides to pursue her last choice, waitlisted option while taking up a job as a nanny to precocious child actress, Lilah. Lilah's wealthy and self-centered mother, who had been an extra in Sixteen Candles, is determined to make Lilah a star. Though rude and curt at first, she quickly warms to the grounded Audrey.

Audrey learns that Lilah is uninterested in being a star and feels controlled by her overbearing mother. In turn, Audrey confesses her own feelings of disappointment that she is always settling for less. Waiting for an audition on AGT that could help launch a 'career,' they simultaneously decide to skip it and go to the beach, as Lilah desires. Her mother is furious she missed the audition, firing Audrey, who happily parts ways with a cheered Lilah.

Though eventually accepted by her safety school, Audrey, when told initially she would be on academic probation, excluding her from much of student life on campus, she declines. Instead, she volunteers for Teachers Without Borders, having discovered her talent for working with children.

=== Foster ===
Foster, Alec's best friend and coworker, is attempting to go through a "wishlist" of girls he would like to sleep with. Alec believes that it is offensive, but Foster is determined to see it through; however, he is repeatedly rejected and ignored by women. After attempting to hook up with a virginal Christian girl, he thinks he is making progress with another at a party, only to discover his wishlist went viral, and no one will sleep with him now.

Discussing the disappointment with Alec, Foster admits that, due to his busy schedule in school, he is actually a virgin; the wishlist was his attempt to make up for lost time. Alec assures him that he does not need to worry. Later, Alec leaves Foster to handle an invoice as he departs to reconnect with Erin. Foster meets with the client, an attractive divorcée, who seductively admits she has been watching him all week, inviting him in. Foster looks back at the audience with a smile before closing the door.

=== Chad and Reece ===
Chad and Reece, two nerdy and unpopular best friends, stop at a bar on the way to a wedding rehearsal dinner and are mistaken for professional traders, as businessmen frequent the bar. The waitress fails to card them, they enjoy drinks, conversation, and karaoke with the businessmen, bluffing their way into their circle. Becoming regulars and networking with the other patrons, they are eventually approached by two twenty-somethings, Janet and Claire, who begin dating them. Though enthralled at first, Chad feels guilty about deceiving the women, who they are sincerely connecting with, and is concerned that they are getting too deep into the lie. Reece begs him to keep the deception going, reminding him that they have never before been so popular and well-liked.

Eventually, Chad confesses he and Reece are actually only 18. An amused Claire reveals that she and Janet knew the entire time, but had gone along with it because they genuinely like them, insisting she finds him cool. Relieved, Chad jokingly asks if they can get married that day, and they resume their relationship.

== Cast ==
- KJ Apa as Griffin Hourigan
- Maia Mitchell as Phoebe Fisher, Griffin's love interest.
- Jacob Latimore as Alec, Erin's ex-boyfriend.
- Halston Sage as Erin Sinclaire, Alec's ex-girlfriend.
- Sosie Bacon as Audrey Jarvis, Erin's best friend.
- Wolfgang Novogratz as Foster, Alec's best friend.
- Gabrielle Anwar as Griffin's Mom
- Ed Quinn as Griffin's Dad
- Jacob McCarthy as Chad
- Mario Revolori as Reece
- Gage Golightly as Paige Wilcox, Alec's new love interest and one of the popular girls in school
- Norman Johnson, Jr. as Mason Riley
- Julia Kelly as Jordan, Paige's good friend and a popular girl in school
- Tyler Posey as Ricky, Erin's new love interest and a rookie baseball player for the Chicago Cubs.
- Audrey Grace Marshall as Lilah
- Greer Grammer as Christine Purdy
- Jackie Sandler as Tracey
- Brenna Sherman as Sierra
- Gabriel "Minnow" Vigliotti as Zachary
- Ryan Hill as Garrett

== Production ==
In January 2018, it was announced that KJ Apa would star in The Last Summer, a film to be directed by William Bindley from a screenplay by Bindley and his brother, Scott Bindley. At the time, principal production was set to get underway on April 23, 2018. In March 2018, Jacob Latimore joined the ensemble, with principal production pushed to May 7, 2018. In April 2018, Maia Mitchell joined the cast to portray Apa's love interest in the film. In May 2018, Tyler Posey and Forrest Goodluck joined the cast.

In June 2018, it was announced that Netflix had acquired worldwide rights to the film with Halston Sage, Sosie Bacon, Gage Golightly, Wolfgang Novogratz, Jacob McCarthy, Mario Revolori (replacing Goodluck) and Gabrielle Anwar joining the ensemble cast.

Principal photography commenced in May 2018.

== Reception ==
On review aggregator website Rotten Tomatoes, the film holds an approval rating of 33% based on six reviews, and an average rating of 4.7/10.

== Awards and nominations ==
Year	Award	Category	Result	Recipient(s)	Ref.
2019	Teen Choice Awards	Choice Summer Movie	The Last Summer	Nominated	
2019	Teen Choice Awards	Choice Summer Movie Actor	KJ Apa	Nominated	
2019	Teen Choice Awards	Choice Summer Movie Actress	Maia Mitchell	Nominated	
