= Feel the Beat (film) =

2020 film by Elissa Down

- Official release poster
- Directed by: Elissa Down
- Written by: Michael Armbruster; Shawn Ku
- Produced by: Susan Cartsonis
- Starring: Sofia Carson; Enrico Colantoni; Donna Lynne Champlin; Wolfgang Novogratz
- Cinematography: Amir Mokri
- Edited by: Jane Moran
- Music by: Michael Yezerski
- Production companies: Resonate Entertainment; Bitter Boy Productions Ltd.; DeluxeFAM Contenidos
- Distributed by: Netflix
- Release date: June 19, 2020
- Running time: 107 minutes
- Country: United States
- Language: English

Feel the Beat is a 2020 American family dance comedy drama film directed by Elissa Down, written by Michael Armbruster and Shawn Ku and starring Sofia Carson, Enrico Colantoni and Wolfgang Novogratz.

The film was released on Netflix on June 19, 2020. It received mixed reviews.

== Plot ==
April Dibrina, a young dancer seeking success on Broadway, steals a cab from an older woman during a rainstorm to get to an audition. She performs well, but sponsor Ruth Zimmer meets the potential dancers. When she recognizes April (from the taxi incident), she vows that no one on Broadway will hire her. While trying to explain, she accidentally knocks Ruth off stage, inflicting serious injury. It is posted on social media, publicly embarrassing April.

Evicted from her apartment, April returns to her hometown in Wisconsin. While at the grocery store, she bumps into the New Hope dance teacher Miss Barb, who invites her to come to the dance studio. April also sees her ex Nick, whom she left to pursue a career in NYC.

In the dance studio, April visits the class of dancers: Lucia, a forgetful girl with glasses; Oona, a nervous girl; Kari, who secretly earns her own classes; Ruby, with no self-confidence; Zuzu, a deaf girl; June, Miss Barb's daughter; Sarah and Michelle, Nick's little sisters. Zuzu's little brother, Dicky, also watches.

Barb asks April to coach the town's dance team for a competition. At first, she declines, but later realizes it can give her a chance to perform in front of Welly Wong, saving her career. April accepts, beginning a harsh training regimen that alienates the young dancers, including causing Ruby to quit.

The New Hope dance team advances through several rounds of the competition; they improve as April bonds with them, becoming a better teacher, including learning some sign language to communicate with Zuzu. One day, the dance studio ceiling collapses after April tells the dancers they "don't suck," so they know they are improving. Unable to afford repairs to the studio, the team moves practice to the football field and eventually move to April's father's barn, which Nick has helped repair.

April and Nick begin to rekindle their relationship as the dance team advances to state. Dancers from another troupe taunt her about her failure in New York, causing her to lose focus during one dance, though she recovers.

In the mini’s 6-and-under category, the two youngest dancers, June and Michelle, are struck with stage fright. Dicky, who has memorized all the girl's choreography while they practiced, runs out and starts to dance. June and Michelle recover, and they all dance together. Dicky now trains with the dance troupe.

After passing state finals, April calls her NYC friend Deco to help make costumes. One day, as the small dancers are rehearsing a lift in the barn, April calls on Sarah and R.J., the football player whom Sarah has a crush and she wants to impress, to demonstrate. When he lifts her, her silicone bra cup falls on the floor, and she runs off, embarrassed and crying. April finds her in the field and comforts her.

The dancers' families raise the money to send the team to Atlantic City for the finals. April reconnects with Nick's younger sister Sarah, who had felt abandoned when her mother died and April moved to New York. Once in Atlantic City, after a performance, Welly Wong is so impressed with April he offers her the lead in his new show on the spot. She and Welly leave the competition immediately for rehearsal in NYC, devastating the team, especially Sarah.

The next day, April realizes her mistake and abandons the rehearsal, proclaiming to Welly that she must honor her commitment to New Hope. She calls Deco again to drive her back to Atlantic City just in time to encourage the team before the performance. After reconciling with her dancers, April and Nick kiss, and Welly keeps her on despite leaving rehearsal.

April performs in Welly Wong's show in NYC and continues teaching her dance class in Wisconsin via video chat. On opening night, Welly surprises April by bringing the New Hope team over for a dance party. Everyone dances in the street, and Ruth Zimmer drives by momentarily, appalled.

== Cast ==
- Sofia Carson as April Dibrina
- Wolfgang Novogratz as Nick
- Donna Lynne Champlin as Barb
- Rex Lee as Wellington 'Welly' Wong
- Brandon Kyle Goodman as Deco
- Eva Hauge as Sarah
- Marissa Jaret Winokur as Herself
- Enrico Colantoni as Frank Dibrina
- Lidya Jewett as Kari
- Sadie Lapidus as Oona
- Johanna Colón as Lucia
- Shaylee Mansfield as Zuzu
- Shiloh Nelson as Ruby
- Justin Allan as Dicky
- Carina Battrick as Michelle
- Kai Zen as June
- Dennis Andres as Buzz

== Reception ==
Review aggregator Rotten Tomatoes reported an approval rating of 53% based on 15 reviews, with an average rating of 5.3/10.

== Soundtrack ==
The film's soundtrack includes:

1. "Let's Do It" - All Talk
2. "Work Dat (So Dat)" - Kylie Diehl
3. "Hand of Man" - Country Joe & The Fish
4. "Round and Round" - Jack Hawitt
5. "Brand New Day" - Kari Kimmel
6. "Never Forgive You" - Brooke Villanyi
7. "Wish You Was Me" - Lauren Evans
8. "Glitter Shoes" - Blaire Reinhard
9. "Confident" - Demi Lovato
10. "Us" - Regina Spektor
11. "Deal With It" - Girli
12. "Pumpin Blood" - NoNoNo
13. "Yes or Yes" - Tricia Battani
14. "I'm Gonna Do My Thing (Hey Hey)" - Mozella
15. "Like That" - Fleur East
16. "Colors" - Wayfarers
17. "Follow the Leader" - Wayfarers
18. "Winner Won't Stop" - Neara Russell
19. "Always" (Acoustic) - Francois Klark
20. "A Little More" - Alessia Cara
21. "Gonna Make You Sweat (Everybody Dance Now)" - C+C Music Factory
22. "All I Wanna Do Is Dance" - Mozella
23. "Always" - Sofia Carson

== See also ==
- List of films featuring the deaf and hard of hearing
