= Bob Novogratz =

American football player (1937–2026)

Profile
- Positions: Guard, linebacker

Personal information
- Born: March 28, 1937; Northampton, Pennsylvania, U.S.
- Died: April 10, 2026 (aged 89)

Career information
- College: United States Military Academy (1957–1958)

Awards and highlights
- First-team All-American (1958); First-team All-Eastern (1958); Second-team All-Eastern (1957)
- College Football Hall of Fame

Robert Martin Novogratz (March 28, 1937 – April 10, 2026) was an American football player. He played college football at the guard and linebacker positions for the Army Cadets football team from 1957 to 1958. He was selected by the Football Writers Association of America (FWAA) as a first-team guard on its 1958 College Football All-America Team. He also won the Knute Rockne Memorial Trophy as the outstanding lineman of the 1958 college football season. The Army football team compiled a 15–2–1 record during his two seasons with the team. He is the father of Mike, Robert Jr. and Jacqueline Novogratz.

On January 14, 2026, Novogratz was inducted into the College Football Hall of Fame. He died from a heart condition on April 10, 2026, at the age of 89.
