= Jacqueline Novogratz =

American businesswoman

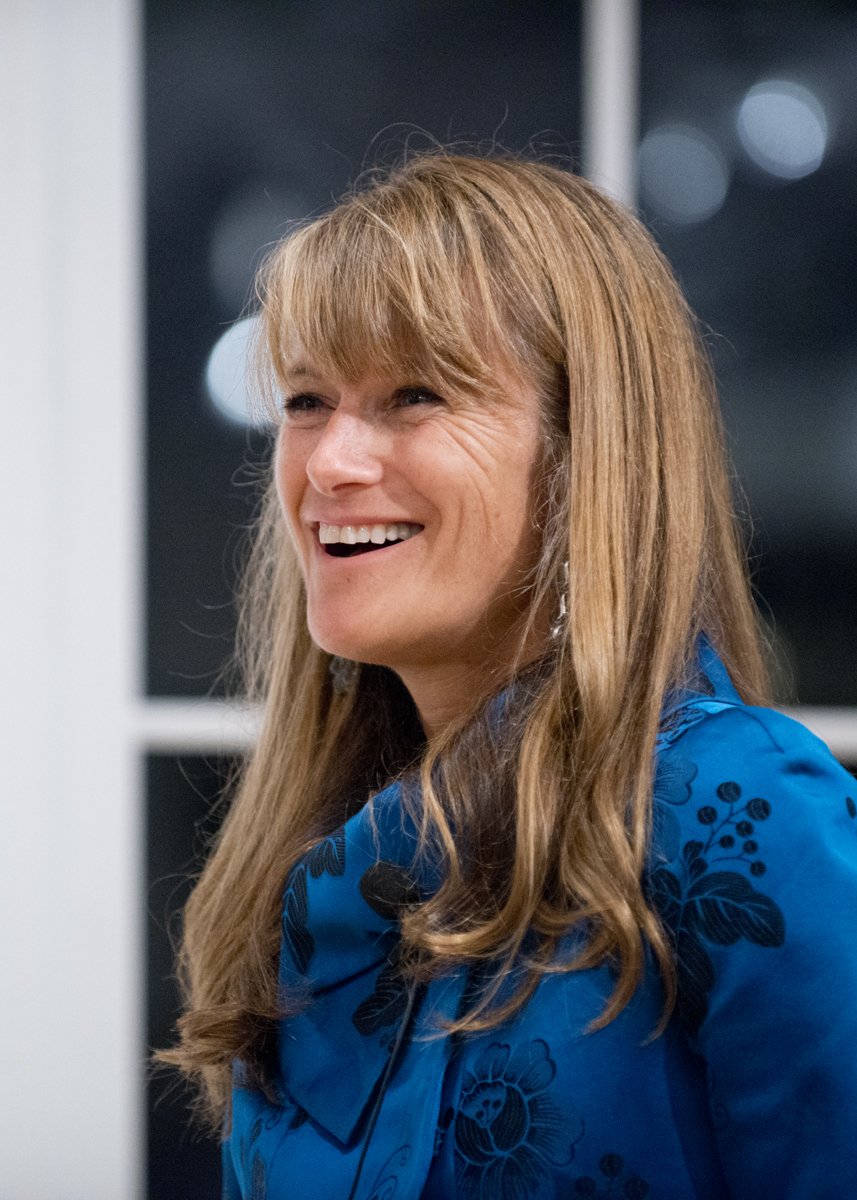
- Born: March 15, 1961 (age 65); US
- Education: University of Virginia; Stanford Graduate School of Business
- Occupation: Businesswoman
- Known for: Founder and CEO, Acumen
- Spouse: Chris Anderson
- Relatives: Bob Novogratz (father); Michael Novogratz (brother); Robert Novogratz (brother); Wolfgang Novogratz (nephew)

Jacqueline Novogratz (born 1961) is an American entrepreneur and author. She is the founder and chief executive of Acumen, a non-profit venture capital fund whose goal is to use entrepreneurial approaches to address global poverty.

== Early life ==
Novogratz was born in 1961 in the US, the eldest of seven children. Her father was a career officer and major in the U.S. Army, and her mother, Barbara, ran an antiques business.

She attended Fort Hunt High School in Alexandria, Virginia, and earned a bachelor's degree from the University of Virginia, where she studied economics and international relations. She earned an MBA from the Stanford Graduate School of Business.

== Career ==
Novogratz started her career at Chase Manhattan Bank in 1983, as an international credit analyst. After three years, she left banking to explore how to make a difference in the world.

She worked throughout Africa as a consultant for the World Bank and for UNICEF. As a UNICEF consultant in Rwanda in the late 1980s, she helped found Duterimbere, a microfinance institution.

Novogratz founded and directed The Philanthropy Workshop and The Next Generation Leadership programs at the Rockefeller Foundation before founding Acumen in 2001. Acumen invests patient capital in businesses that provide critical goods and services to people living in poverty. It estimates that it has impacted 648 million people through its investments. Novogratz oversaw the development of Acumen's Fellowship program, which develops leaders for the social sector.

Novogratz serves on the Harvard Business School Social Enterprise Initiative, and UNICEF. She also serves on the Aspen Institute board of trustees, the Pakistan Business Council Centre of Excellence in Responsible Business (CERB)], is a member of the Council on Foreign Relations, and the American Academy of Arts & Sciences. Hillary Clinton, as Secretary of State, appointed Novogratz to the State Department's Foreign Affairs Policy Board.

== The Blue Sweater ==
In 2009, Novogratz published The Blue Sweater: Bridging the Gap Between Rich and Poor in an Interconnected World. The book is a firsthand account of her journey from international banker to social entrepreneur and founder of Acumen.

The title of her book, The Blue Sweater, refers to an encounter she had in Kigali, Rwanda. Novogratz spotted a boy wearing a blue sweater. She recognized it as a sweater she had owned and given to Goodwill a decade earlier; it was hers, with her name on the tag. The encounter was an epiphany for Novogratz; her sense of the interconnectedness of our world has continued to influence her current work.

== Personal life ==
Novogratz is married to Chris Anderson, the owner of TED Talks.

Her brothers include Michael Novogratz and Robert Novogratz.

== Awards ==
- Forbes magazine's 100 Greatest Living Business Minds, 2017
- Forbes 400 Lifetime Achievement Award for Social Entrepreneurship, 2016
- The Resolution Project Champions Circle Award, 2016
- Asia Society Game Changer, 2014
- Bloomberg Markets 50 Most Influential in Global Finance, 2014
- 25 Most Successful Stanford Business School Graduates of All time
- University of Virginia Distinguished Alumna Award, 2013
- Middlebury College CSE Vision Award and honorary doctorate, 2013
- Notre Dame Award for International Human Development, 2013
- Women of Concern Humanitarian Award, 2012
- Rensselaer Polytechnic Institute’s Entrepreneur of the Year Award, 2010
- Wofford College’s Sandor Teszler Award for Moral Courage and Service to Humankind in Spartanburg, SC, 2010
- Foreign Policy's Top 100 Global Thinkers, 2009
- Daily Beast's 25 Smartest People of the Decade, 2009
- AWNY's Changing the Game Award, 2009
- Ernst & Young Entrepreneur of the Year 2008
- Rockefeller Foundation Warren Weaver Fellow
- Aspen Institute Henry Crown Fellow

== Honorary degrees ==
- Doctor of Humane Letters New England College, 2017
- Doctor of Laws, University of Toronto, 2015
- Doctor of Humane Letters, Bard College, 2014
- Doctorate of Humane Letters, Middlebury College, 2013
- Doctor of Humane Letters, Fordham University, 2012
- Doctor of Laws, University of Notre Dame, 2011
- Doctor of Humanities, Wofford College, 2010

== Works ==
- The blue sweater : bridging the gap between rich and poor in an interconnected world, New York Rodale 2010. ISBN 9781586489564
- Manifesto for a moral revolution : Practices to Build a Better World, New York: Henry Holt and Company, 2020. ISBN 9781250222879
