= Acumen (organization) =

US-based nonprofit impact investment fund

Acumen Fund, Inc.
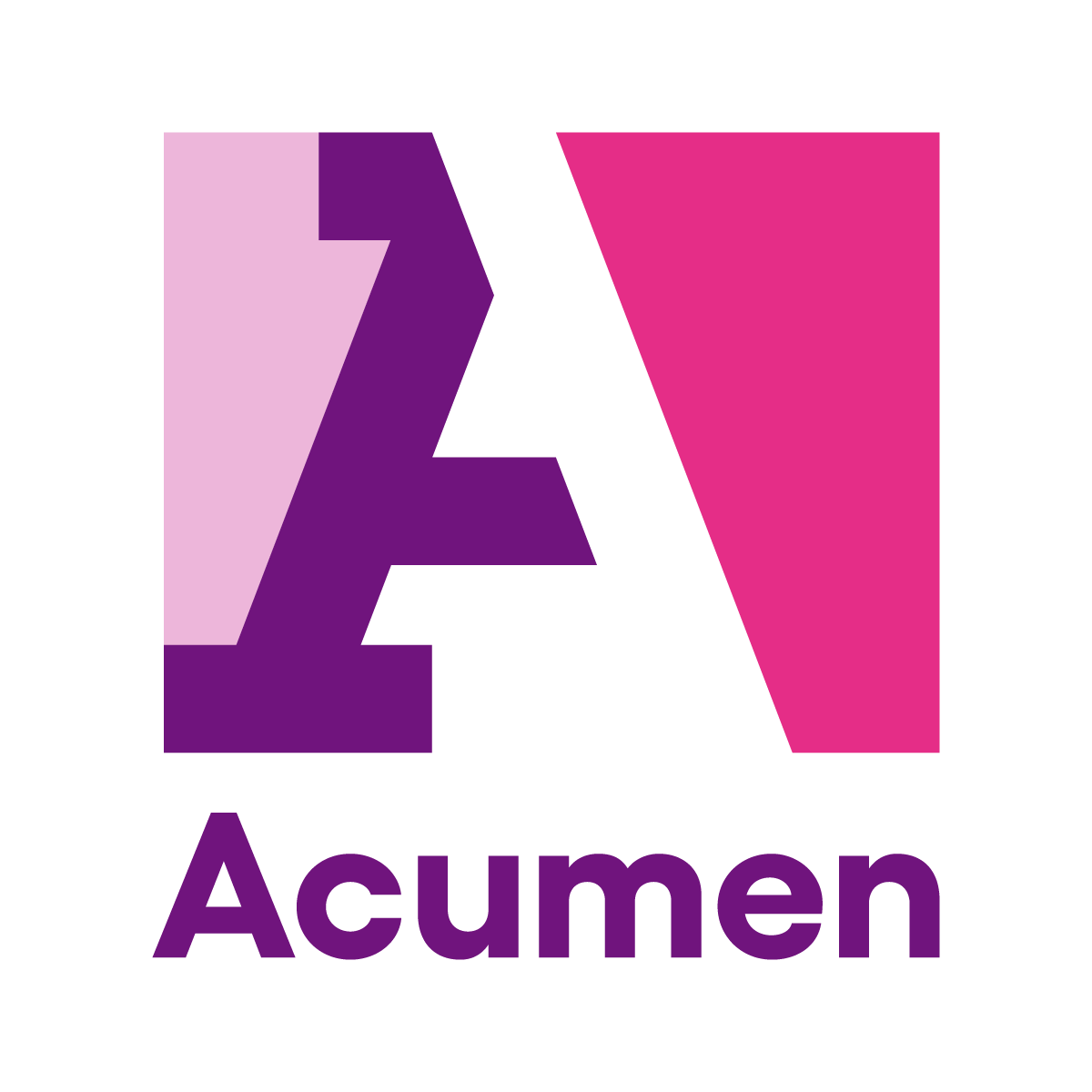
- Type: Non-profit organization Investment fund
- Founded: April 1, 2001
- Founder: Jacqueline Novogratz
- Headquarters: United States
- Number of locations: 9 offices across 5 continents
- Revenue: US$47.3 million (2024)
- Total assets: US$221.7 million (2024)
- Website: acumen.org

Acumen is a global impact investment organization that brings together investors, entrepreneurs, and philanthropists to address poverty and expand access to essential goods and services in low-income communities. Founded in 2001, Acumen uses patient capital to invest in companies, leaders, and ideas to build inclusive and sustainable markets. The non-profit operates in East and West Africa, Europe, India, Latin America, Pakistan, Southeast Asia, sub-Saharan Africa, and the United States, particularly in communities that markets and aid have historically underserved.

Acumen has been described as a pioneer of patient capital, a form of long-term investment that seeks to balance social impact with financial sustainability. Alongside its investment work, the organization runs regional-level leadership development programs through Acumen Academy.

Acumen has invested over $111 million in 104 companies in Africa, Latin America, South Asia and the United States. Their investees created over 35,000 jobs.

== History ==
Acumen was founded in 2001 by Jacqueline Novogratz, a former banker and development professional, based on the idea that market-based approaches, when paired with long-term capital and moral leadership, could address persistent gaps left by traditional philanthropy and aid. The organization was established to test and prove that long-term, risk-tolerant capital can support enterprises serving low-income populations while achieving modest financial returns.

In its early years, Acumen focused on investments in healthcare and water access in South Asia and East Africa. Over time, it expanded its geographic footprint and sector focus to include agriculture, clean energy, education, workforce development, and gender equality. Acumen has also contributed to the broader field of impact investing through research, public dialogue, and partnerships related to its areas of focus and to the evolution of the impact investing field.

== Mission and philosophy ==
Acumen states that its mission is to solve the problems of poverty and build a world based on dignity by investing in sustainable businesses, leaders, and systems. The organization emphasizes dignity, long-term thinking, and moral leadership as central to its approach to impact investing and leadership development.

== Investment model ==
Acumen deploys patient capital in the form of equity, debt, and other financial instruments. These investments are typically long-term, with below-market or risk-adjusted return expectations, and are targeted at early-stage or growth-stage enterprises serving low-income customers.

In addition to providing capital, Acumen often offers strategic support to portfolio companies, including governance assistance, operational guidance, and connections to networks of partners and investors. Social impact is assessed alongside financial performance using internally developed impact measurement frameworks.

Acumen invests from $300,000 to $2,500,000 patient capital in enterprises in equity or debt with a payback or exit timeline of roughly five to seven years.

== Programs and funds ==
=== Investment funds ===
Acumen manages multiple sector- and region-focused investment funds that deploy patient capital into early-stage and growth-stage social enterprises. These funds typically invest in areas aligned with Acumen's mission, including agriculture, clean energy, healthcare, education, workforce development, and gender equality.

Some funds are structured to focus on specific geographies or thematic priorities, such as climate resilience, energy access, or gender inclusion. Capital is provided through a mix of equity, debt, and other financial instruments, with an emphasis on long-term sustainability rather than short-term returns. Acumen also sponsors several returnable investment funds including ACAP, KawiSafi Ventures, ARAF and ALIVE.

=== Hardest-to-Reach Initiative (H2R) ===
In 2023, Acumen launched the Hardest-to-Reach Initiative (H2R), a blended finance platform to expand access to clean energy in underserved and fragile markets in sub-Saharan Africa, targeting nearly 70 million people, including approximately 50 million first-time energy users, across 17 countries with low electrification rates. Announced at COP28 and anchored by support from the Green Climate Fund, the initiative supports off-grid and distributed energy solutions through two investment vehicles: H2R Catalyze, which provides flexible, market-building capital in higher-risk contexts, and H2R Amplify, a scale-focused debt fund providing growth capital to energy companies.^{[1]}

In September 2025, Acumen announced the first close of H2R, reporting approximately $246 million in approved and committed capital from institutional backers including the Green Climate Fund, the International Finance Corporation, Shinhan Bank, Nordic Development Fund, British International Investment, and the Soros Economic Development Fund. In January 2026, Acumen reported that the initiative had reached its $250 million target following the final close of H2R Amplify, which included a $7.8 million commitment from the Swiss Agency for Development and Cooperation.

In December 2025, the initiative was named the Deal and Financing Program of the Year at the 2025 AFSIA Solar Awards, presented by the Africa Solar Industry Association in Accra, Ghana.
