= 9 By Design =

- Genre: Reality television
- Starring: Robert Novogratz; Cortney Novogratz
- Country of origin: United States
- Original language: English
- No. of seasons: 1
- No. of episodes: 8

Production
- Executive producers: Ken Druckerman; Banks Tarver
- Camera setup: Multiple
- Running time: 22 minutes
- Production company: Left/Right Inc.

Original release
- Network: Bravo
- Release: April 13 – June 1, 2010

9 By Design is an American reality television series that premiered on April 13, 2010, on Bravo. Announced in April 2009 and initially titled as Design Sixx, the show features Robert and Cortney Novogratz, a New York–based husband and wife design team. The eight-part series follows the duo working on large-scale design developments.

The first season averaged 475,000 viewers. The show did not return for a second season.

== Episodes ==
No.	Title	Original release date
1	"This Old House"	April 13, 2010
2	"The Wild, Wild West Village"	April 20, 2010
3	"Major Work Out"	April 27, 2010
4	"Weekend in the Hamptons"	May 4, 2010
5	"With Benefits"	May 11, 2010
6	"London Calling"	May 18, 2010
7	"Down at the Jersey Shore"	May 25, 2010
8	"Selling Point"	June 1, 2010
