= 1959 USC Trojans football team =

American college football season

1959 USC Trojans football

AAWU co-champion
- Conference: Athletic Association of Western Universities

Ranking
- Coaches: No. 13
- AP: No. 14
- Record: 8–2 (3–1 AAWU)
- Head coach: Don Clark (3rd season)
- Home stadium: Los Angeles Memorial Coliseum

1959 Athletic Association of Western Universities football standings
	Conf.					Overall
Team	W		L		T	W		L		T
No. 8 Washington ^ +	3	–	1	–	0	10	–	1	–	0
No. 14 USC +	3	–	1	–	0	8	–	2	–	0
UCLA +	3	–	1	–	0	5	–	4	–	1
California	1	–	3	–	0	2	–	8	–	0
Stanford	0	–	4	–	0	3	–	7	–	0
+ – Conference co-champions; ^ – Selected as Rose Bowl representative; Rankings from AP poll

The 1959 USC Trojans football team represented the University of Southern California (USC) in the 1959 college football season. In their third year under head coach Don Clark, the Trojans compiled an 8–2 record (3–1 against conference opponents), finished in a tie for the Athletic Association of Western Universities championship, and outscored their opponents by a combined total of 195 to 90. Total attendance for all 10 games was 453,865.

Ben Charles led the team in passing with 20 of 46 passes completed for 843 yards, four touchdowns and three interceptions. Jerry Traynham led the team in rushing with 123 carries for 583 yards and two touchdowns. Luther Hayes was the leading receiver with nine catches for 179 yards and two touchdowns.

This was the first season for the five-team AAWU, following the dissolution of the Pacific Coast Conference in the spring. It comprised the four teams from state of California and Washington in Seattle. The other four teams from the north (Oregon, Oregon State, Washington State, and Idaho) were independent for several seasons.

== Schedule ==
Date	Opponent	Rank	Site	Result	Attendance	Source
September 19	at Oregon State*		Multnomah Stadium; Portland, OR	W 27–6	23,895	
September 25	Pittsburgh*	No. 11	Los Angeles Memorial Coliseum; Los Angeles, CA	W 23–0	34,172	
October 2	No. 14 Ohio State*	No. 11	Los Angeles Memorial Coliseum; Los Angeles, CA	W 17–0	49,592	
October 17	at No. 18 Washington	No. 7	Husky Stadium; Seattle, WA	W 22–15	52,500	
October 24	Stanford	No. 5	Los Angeles Memorial Coliseum; Los Angeles, CA (rivalry)	W 30–28	44,209	
October 31	at California	No. 6	California Memorial Stadium; Berkeley, CA	W 14–7	37,000	
November 7	West Virginia*	No. 6	Los Angeles Memorial Coliseum; Los Angeles, CA	W 36–0	34,066	
November 14	at Baylor*	No. 4	Los Angeles Memorial Coliseum; Los Angeles, CA	W 17–8	43,832	
November 21	UCLA^{†}	No. 4	Los Angeles Memorial Coliseum; Los Angeles, CA (Victory Bell)	L 3–10	85,917–85,951	
November 28	at Notre Dame*	No. 7	Notre Dame Stadium; Notre Dame, IN (rivalry)	L 6–16	48,682	
*Non-conference game; ^{†}Homecoming; Rankings from AP Poll released prior to the game; Source:

== Personnel ==
=== Coaching staff ===
- Head coach: Don Clark
- Assistant coaches: Ray George, Al Davis, Mel Hein, Marv Goux, Jim Sears, John McKay
- Manager: Bob Lambeth

=== Players ===
- Al Bansavage, guard, 6'2", 220 pounds, Union City, California
- Mike Bundra, tackle, 6'2", 232 pounds, Catasaugua, Pennsylvania
- Ben Charles, quarterback
- Angelo Coia, halfback, 6'2", 195 pounds, Philadelphia
- Jim Conroy, fullback, 6'0", 197 pounds, Baldwin Park, California
- Dan Ficca, tackle, 6'1", 230 pounds, Atlas, Pennsylvania
- Garry Finneran, tackle, 6'2", 219 pounds, Cathedral
- Lynn Gaskill, halfback, 6'0", 175 pounds, Banning, California
- Luther Hayes, end, 6'4", 198 pounds, San Diego, California
- Clark Holden, fullback, 5'10", 195 pounds, Marshall, California
- Bob Levingston, halfback, 6'0", 185 pounds, Los Angeles
- Marv Marinovich, tackle, 6'3", 220 pounds, Watsonville, California
- Marlin McKeever, end, 6'1", 215 pounds, Mt. Carmel, California
- Mike McKeever, 6'1", 215 pounds, guard, Mt. Carmel, California
- Roger Mietz, guard, 5'10", 206 pounds, San Leandro, California
- Ron Mix, tackle, 6'3", 215, Hawthorne, California
- Dave Morgan, center, 6'4", 204 pounds, Natick, Massachusetts
- Al Prukop, quarterback, 6'1", 181 pounds, Mt. Carmel (led the team with 405 minutes played)
- Jerry Traynham, halfback, 5'10", 180 pounds, Woodland, California
- Jack Treier, center, 6'3", 208 pounds, Lancaster, Pennsylvania
- George Van Vliet, 6'2", 195 pounds, end, Whittier, California
- Glenn Wilder, 6'0", 181 pounds, end, Van Nuys, California
- Britt Williams, guard, 6'1", 210 pounds, Walnut Creek, California
- Willie Wood, quarterback, 5'9", 170 pounds, Washington, D.C.
