= George Fleming (American football) =

American politician and football player (1938–2021)

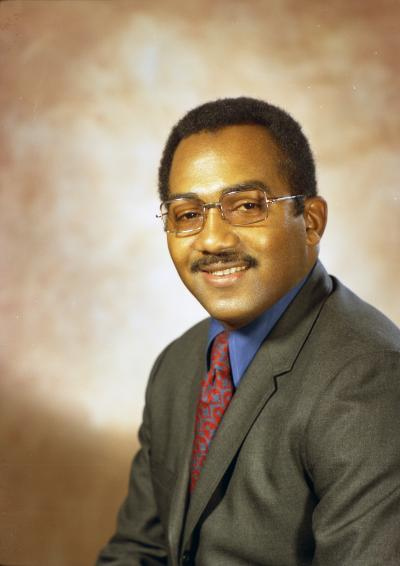
- Fleming in 1971

Profile
- Position: RB; Placekicker

Personal information
- Born: June 29, 1938; Dallas, Texas, U.S.
- Died: December 6, 2021 (aged 83); Seattle, Washington, U.S.

Career information
- High school: Dallas (TX) Booker T. Washington
- College: Washington
- NFL draft: 1961: 6th round, 76th overall pick
- AFL draft: 1961: 2nd round, 13th overall pick

Career history
- 1961: Oakland Raiders
- 1963–1964: Winnipeg Blue Bombers

Awards and highlights
- Dave Dryburgh Memorial Trophy (1963); First-team All-PCC (1960); Second-team All-PCC (1959); Held the Rose Bowl, AFL and CFL records for longest 3-pointers.
- Stats at Pro Football Reference

Other information

Member of the Washington House of Representatives from the 37th district
- In office 1969–1971

Member of the Washington State Senate from the 37th district
- In office 1971–1991

Personal details
- Party: Democratic

George Tyree Fleming (June 29, 1938 – December 6, 2021) was an American politician and professional football player. A multi-positional player, he played college football for the Washington Huskies. Fleming was a member of AAWU champion 1959 and 1960 Washington Huskies football teams, playing in the 1960 and 1961 Rose Bowls. He earned second-team All-Coast halfback and Co-Player of the Game honors after the Huskies' win in 1960 Rose Bowl. For his contribution to the Rose Bowl game, he was inducted into the Rose Bowl Hall of Fame on December 31, 2011.

In 1968, Fleming entered a career in Washington state politics, including two years in the state House of Representatives and 20 in the Senate. He retired after the 1990 session.

Fleming died at his Seattle home on December 6, 2021, at the age of 83.

== See also ==
- Washington Huskies football statistical leaders

| Preceded by Bob Jeter | Rose Bowl MVP co-MVP with Bob Schloredt; 1960 | Succeeded by Bob Schloredt |
