= 1959 Pacific Tigers football team =

American college football season

1959 Pacific Tigers football
- Conference: Independent
- Record: 5–4
- Head coach: Jack Myers (7th season)
- Home stadium: Pacific Memorial Stadium

1959 Western major college football independents records
	Conf.			Overall
Team	W	L	T	W		L		T
Oregon		–		8	–	2	–	0
Washington State		–		6	–	4	–	0
Pacific (CA)		–		5	–	4	–	0
Air Force		–		5	–	4	–	1
San Jose State		–		4	–	6	–	0
Oregon State		–		3	–	7	–	0
Idaho		–		1	–	9	–	0

The 1959 Pacific Tigers football team represented the College of the Pacific (COP)—now known as the University of the Pacific—as an independent during the 1959 college football season. Led by seventh-year head coach Jack Myers, the Tigers compiled a record of 6–4 and outscored opponents 132 to 117. The team played home games at Pacific Memorial Stadium in Stockton, California.

== Schedule ==
Date	Opponent	Site	Result	Attendance	Source
September 19	Colorado State	Pacific Memorial Stadium; Stockton, CA	L 6–9	17,000–17,500	
October 3	at Stanford	Stanford Stadium; Stanford, CA	L 6–21	35,000	
October 10	Washington State	Pacific Memorial Stadium; Stockton, CA	L 12–20	15,500	
October 17	Marquette^{†}	Pacific Memorial Stadium; Stockton, CA	W 22–13	20,800	
October 24	at Cincinnati	Nippert Stadium; Cincinnati, OH	L 14–21	18,000	
October 30	at Hawaii	Honolulu Stadium; Honolulu, HI	W 6–0	20,000	
November 7	Fresno State	Pacific Memorial Stadium; Stockton, CA	W 18–13	12,500	
November 14	Idaho	Pacific Memorial Stadium; Stockton, CA	W 28–13	8,000	
November 20	San Jose State	Pacific Memorial Stadium; Stockton, CA (Victory Bell)	W 20–7	14,000	
^{†}Homecoming

== Team players in the AFL/NFL ==
The following College of the Pacific players were selected in the 1960 NFL draft.

Player	Position	Round	Overall	NFL team
Carl Kammerer	Defensive end – Linebacker	2	22	San Francisco 49ers
Lee Murchison	Wide receiver	6	70	San Francisco 49ers

The following College of the Pacific players were selected in the 1960 AFL draft.

Player	Position	Round	Overall	AFL team
Dick Bass	Halfback	1	First Selections	Houston Oilers
Lee Murchison	End	2	First Selections	Dallas Texans
Wayne Hawkins	Tackle	2	First Selections	Denver Broncos

The following finished their college career at Pacific, were not drafted, but played in the inaugural season of the AFL.

Player	Position	First AFL team
Henry Wallace	Defensive back	1960 Los Angeles Chargers
Jack Larscheid	Halfback	1960 Oakland Raiders
Tom Flores	Quarterback	1960 Oakland Raiders
