= Jim Owens =

American football player and coach, college athletics administrator (1927–2009)

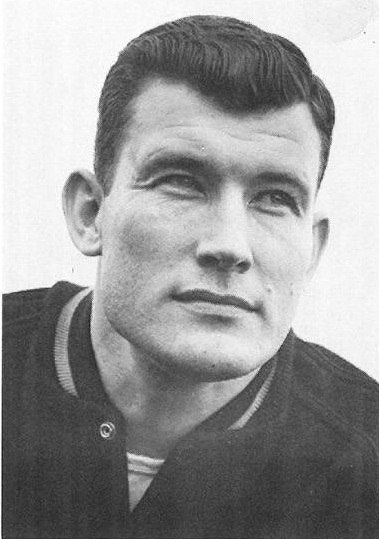
- Owens from 1960 UW yearbook

No. 59
- Positions: End, defensive end

Personal information
- Born: March 6, 1927; Oklahoma City, Oklahoma, U.S.
- Died: June 6, 2009 (aged 82); Bigfork, Montana, U.S.
- Listed height: 6 ft 3 in (1.91 m)
- Listed weight: 205 lb (93 kg)

Career information
- High school: Classen (Oklahoma City)
- College: Oklahoma (1946–1949)
- NFL draft: 1951: 23rd round, 271st overall pick

Career history

Playing
- Baltimore Colts (1950)

Coaching
- Kentucky (1951-1953) Assistant; Texas A&M (1954-1956) Assistant; Washington (1957-1974) Head coach

Operations
- Washington (1960-1969)

Awards and highlights
- National champion (1960); 3× AAWU champion (1959, 1960, 1963); UPI Pacific Coast Coach of the Year (1959, 1960); First-team All-American (1949); 2× First-team All-Big Seven (1948, 1949)

Career NFL statistics
- Receptions: 19
- Receiving yards: 188
- Return yards: 29
- Stats at Pro Football Reference

Head coaching record
- Regular season: 99–82–6 (.545)
- Postseason: Bowl games: 2–1–0 (.667)
- College Football Hall of Fame

James Donald Owens (March 6, 1927 – June 6, 2009) was an American professional football player and coach. He played one year in the National Football League (NFL) as an end for the Baltimore Colts. His career in coaching was longer-lived, as he held the position of head coach at the University of Washington from 1957 to 1974, compiling a record of 99–82–6 (.545) in 18 seasons.

== Biography ==
=== Playing career ===
Packing a white night-time football, Jim Owens is tackled at the end of a 20-yard reception from quarterback Y.A. Tittle in an August 1950 preseason NFL game.

Owens played college football at the University of Oklahoma from 1946 to 1949, under head coach Bud Wilkinson, where he was a teammate of Darrell Royal, who, coincidentally, was the Huskies' head coach in 1956, then took the same post at Texas, allowing Owens to come to Seattle. He played a year of professional football in 1950 for the Baltimore Colts, a one-win squad worthy of mention as among the worst teams in NFL history.

=== Coaching career ===
After his brief foray in professional football came to an end, Owens served as a college assistant coach for six years under Bear Bryant at the University of Kentucky and at Texas A&M University. According to legend, after the 1956 season, when the Washington Huskies were looking for a head coach, Bryant indicated to reporters that Owens "will make a great coach for somebody some day."

In 1959 and 1960, he led Washington to back-to-back ten-win seasons and consecutive Rose Bowl wins. He was awarded the UPI Pacific Coast Coach of the Year for 1959 and 1960. He also coached the Huskies to the 1964 Rose Bowl. Owens concurrently served as the athletic director at Washington from 1960 to 1969. He was elected to the College Football Hall of Fame as a player in 1982.

Owens' 1960 team was awarded the national championship by the Helms Athletic Foundation after defeating Minnesota in the 1961 Rose Bowl. The Golden Gophers had already been awarded the AP, UPI, and NFF national championships at the end of the regular season, as was customary at the time.

Owens resigned as head coach of the Huskies following the 1974 season at the end of his last contract, a three-year deal at $33,000 per year. His later years at Washington were marred by accusations of racism and the backlash that resulted from his actions and attitudes towards black players. He was succeeded as head coach by Don James, the head coach at Kent State, who also led the Huskies for eighteen seasons. Owens later apologized for his actions as part of his acknowledgements as a statue of him was erected at Washington in 2003.

Owens died at age 82 in 2009 at his home in Bigfork, Montana.

== Head coaching record ==
Year	Team	Overall	Conference	Standing	Bowl/playoffs	Coaches^{#}	AP^{°}
Washington Huskies (Pacific Coast Conference) (1957–1958)
1957	Washington	3–6–1	3–4	7th			
1958	Washington	3–7	1–6	8th			
Washington Huskies (Athletic Association of Western Universities / Pacific-8 Conference) (1959–1974)
1959	Washington	10–1	6–1	T–1st	W Rose	7	8
1960	Washington	10–1	7–0	1st	W Rose	5	6
1961	Washington	5–4–1	2–1–1	T–2nd			
1962	Washington	7–1–2	4–1	2nd		14	
1963	Washington	6–5	4–1	1st	L Rose	15	
1964	Washington	6–4	5–2	3rd			
1965	Washington	5–5	4–3	4th			
1966	Washington	6–4	4–3	4th			
1967	Washington	5–5	3–4	T–3rd			
1968	Washington	3–5–2	1–5–1	8th			
1969	Washington	1–9	1–7	7th			
1970	Washington	6–4	4–3	T–2nd			
1971	Washington	8–3	4–3	T–3rd			19
1972	Washington	8–3	4–3	T–3rd			
1973	Washington	2–9	0–7	8th			
1974	Washington	5–6	3–4	T–5th			
Washington:		99–82–6	60–58–2				
Total:		99–82–6					
National championship Conference title Conference division title or championship game berth
^{#}Rankings from final Coaches Poll.; ^{°}Rankings from final AP Poll.
