= 1959 college football season =

American college football season

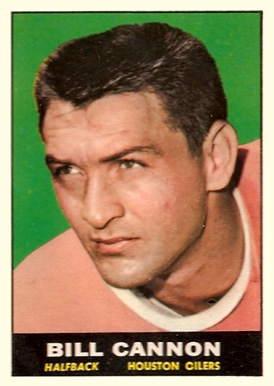
- Heisman Trophy winner Billy Cannon
- Preseason AP No. 1: LSU
- Regular season: September 19 – December 5, 1959
- Number of bowls: 8
- Bowl games: December 19, 1959 – January 2, 1960
- Champion(s): Syracuse (AP, Coaches, FWAA, NFF)
- Heisman: LSU halfback Billy Cannon

The 1959 college football season was the 91st season of intercollegiate football in the United States. It concluded with two teams having claim to the major college national championship:

- Syracuse compiled a perfect 11–0 record, including a victory over No. 4 Texas in the Cotton Bowl, and led the country in total offense (451.5 yards per game), scoring offense (39.0 points per game), total defense (96.2 yards per game), and rushing defense (19.3 yards per game). The Orangemen were ranked No. 1 in the final Associated Press (AP) writers poll and United Press International (UPI) coaches poll and have been selected as the national champion by, among others, the Billingsley Report, Football Writers Association of America, College Football Researchers Association, Football News, Helms Athletic Foundation, Litkenhous, National Championship Foundation, and National Football Foundation. Guard Roger Davis was a unanimous All-American.
- Ole Miss compiled a 10–1 record, including a victory over No. 3 LSU in the Sugar Bowl, led the country in scoring defense (2.1 points per game), and was ranked No. 2 in the final AP and UP polls. The Rebels have been rated as the 1959 national champion by Berryman QPRS, Billingsley Report, Dunkel System, and Sagarin Ratings. Fullback Charlie Flowers was a unanimous All-American selection.

Three small college teams also claimed national championships:

- Bowling Green compiled a 9–0 record and was named the UPI small college national champion. Jack Harbaugh, who later gained fame as a coach (and the father of John and Jim Harbaugh), set a school record with three interceptions in the November 14 game against No. 1 Delaware.
- Florida A&M, led by Hall of Fame coach Jake Gaither, compiled a 10–0 record, defeated Prairie View A&M in the Orange Blossom Classic, and was selected as the black college national champion.
- Texas A&I compiled a 12–1 record and defeated Lenoir Rhyne in the Holiday Bowl to win the NAIA football national championship. It was the first of seven national championships for Texas A&I.

LSU halfback Billy Cannon won the Heisman Trophy, and Penn State quarterback Richie Lucas received the Maxwell Award. Individual statistical leaders in major college football included New Mexico State running back Pervis Atkins with 971 rushing yards and 107 points scored and Stanford quarterback Dick Norman with 1,963 passing yards and 2,018 yards of total offense.

A rule change in 1959 widened the goal posts from 18 ft 6 in (5.64 m) to 23 ft 4 in (7.11 m). This width remained in effect for 32 seasons, until the 1991 season, when it was returned to 18½ feet.

== Conference and program changes ==
=== Conference changes ===
- One conference began play in 1959:
  - Athletic Association of Western Universities – predecessor to the modern Pac-12 Conference; founded by five members (California, Stanford, USC, UCLA, and Washington) of the Pacific Coast Conference, which had disbanded in June. The remaining four (Idaho, Oregon, Oregon State, and Washington State) became independents; Washington State joined in 1962, followed by Oregon and Oregon State in 1964.

=== Membership changes ===
School	1958 Conference	1959 Conference
California Golden Bears	PCC	AAWU
Idaho Vandals	PCC	Independent
Oregon Ducks	PCC	Independent
Oregon State Beavers	PCC	Independent
USC Trojans	PCC	AAWU
Stanford Indians	PCC	AAWU
UCLA Bruins	PCC	AAWU
Washington Huskies	PCC	AAWU
Washington State Cougars	PCC	Independent

== Season chronology ==
=== September ===
In the preseason poll released on September 14, the defending champion LSU Tigers were ranked first, followed by Oklahoma, Auburn, SMU, and Army. With more than 100 sportswriters weighing in, eighteen different schools received first place votes. Syracuse was ranked No. 20 overall. As the regular season progressed, a new poll would be issued on the Monday following the weekend's games.

On September 19, No. 1 LSU beat Rice at home, 26–3. Oklahoma, Auburn, SMU, and Army had not yet opened their seasons; SMU and Army fell to 6th and 7th. No. 8 Mississippi, which won 16–0 at Houston, rose to 4th in the next poll. No. 18 Clemson moved up to 5th after its 20–18 win at No. 12 North Carolina. Three of the Top Five schools were from the SEC: No. 1 LSU, No. 2 Oklahoma, No. 3 Auburn, No. 4 Mississippi, and No. 5 Clemson

September 26 No. 1 LSU beat No. 9 TCU at home, 10–0. No. 2 Oklahoma lost its opener, falling 45–13 at No. 10 Northwestern, and dropped out of the Top 20 entirely, while Northwestern took its place. No. 3 Auburn lost at Tennessee 3–0 and fell to 17th place in the next poll. No. 4 Mississippi recorded another 16–0 win, this time at Kentucky, and rose to third. No. 5 Clemson won at 47–0 at Virginia, but fell to 6th. No. 7 Army returned to the Top 5 after its 44–8 win over Boston College. No. 13 Iowa, which had won at California 42–12, rose to fifth. The next poll was No. 1 LSU, No. 2 Northwestern, No. 3 Mississippi, No. 4 Army, and No. 5 Iowa.

=== October ===
October 3 No. 1 LSU and Baylor met at a game in Shreveport, with LSU winning 22–0. No. 2 Northwestern won at No. 5 Iowa, 14–10. No. 3 Mississippi registered a third shutout, beating Memphis State 43–0, but fell to fifth. No. 4 Army lost at Illinois, 20–14, and fell out of the Top 20 completely. No. 7 Georgia Tech which went to 3–0 after a 16–6 win over No. 6 Clemson, rose to 3rd in the poll. No. 10 Texas rose to fourth after its third shutout in a row, a 33–0 walloping of California. The poll was: No. 1 LSU, No. 2 Northwestern, No. 3 Georgia Tech, No. 4 Texas, and No. 5 Mississippi.

October 10 No. 1 LSU beat the visiting Miami Hurricanes 27–3. No. 2 Northwestern beat Minnesota 6–0. No. 3 Georgia Tech won at No. 8 Tennessee, 14–7. In Dallas, No. 4 Texas defeated No. 13 Oklahoma 19–12. No. 5 Mississippi won at Vanderbilt, 33–0. In four games, Ole Miss was 4–0 and had outscored its opponents 108–0. The next poll was: No. 1 LSU, No. 2 Northwestern, No. 3 Texas, No. 4 Georgia Tech, and No. 5 Mississippi.

On October 17, No. 1 LSU won at Kentucky, 9–0. No. 2 Northwestern won at Michigan 20–7. No. 3 Texas narrowly beat No. 12 Arkansas 13–12 in Little Rock. No. 4 Georgia Tech lost to No. 11 Auburn, 7–6. No. 5 Mississippi yielded some points for the first time in the season, but beat Tulane 53–7. The No. 7 USC Trojans rose to 5th after beating No. 18 Washington in Seattle, 22–15. The next poll was: No. 1 LSU, No. 2 Northwestern, No. 3 Texas, No. 4 Mississippi, and No. 5 USC.

October 24 No. 1 LSU recorded its fourth shutout, winning 9–0 in Florida. No. 2 Northwestern killed another giant on the road, beating Notre Dame 30–24. No. 3 Texas defeated Rice 28–6. No. 4 Mississippi shut out No. 10 Arkansas 28–0 at Memphis. The No. 5 USC Trojans got past Stanford 30–28 and fell to 6th. Taking USC's place was No. 6 Syracuse, which had beaten West Virginia 44–0 to reach the 5–0 mark. The next poll was: No. 1 LSU, No. 2 Northwestern, No. 3 Mississippi, No. 4 Texas, and No. 5 Syracuse.

October 31 No. 1 LSU and No. 3 Mississippi, both 6–0, met in Baton Rouge and both schools had great defenses. LSU had outscored its opposition 103–6, while Ole Miss had a 189–7 point differential over all comers. Someone had to lose, and Ole Miss fell to LSU 7–3. Billy Cannon returned a Jake Gibbs punt 89 yards for the game's only touchdown, but the Rebels had a chance to win the game when it drove to the LSU 1–yard line in the closing seconds, only to see third-string quarterback Doug Elmore stopped cold on fourth and goal by Cannon. No. 2 Northwestern beat visiting Indiana 30–13. No. 4 Texas beat SMU in Dallas, 21–0. No. 5 Syracuse won at Pittsburgh, 35–0, and rose to fourth. The next poll was: No. 1 LSU, No. 2 Northwestern, No. 3 Texas, No. 4 Syracuse, and No. 5 Mississippi.

=== November ===
November 7 No. 1 LSU traveled to Knoxville to face No. 13 Tennessee, and gave up a touchdown for the first time in the season. The Vols made it to the end zone twice, winning 14–13 over the Tigers. Losing also was No. 2 Northwestern, which fell to visiting No. 9 Wisconsin, 24–19, and dropped to 6th. Northwestern would close the season on a three-game losing streak after a 6–0 start. No. 3 Texas won a close one over Baylor, 13–12, and rose to 2nd. No. 4 Syracuse, which had won at No. 7 Penn State 20–18, was catapulted to the No. 1 spot. No. 5 Mississippi crushed UT-Chattanooga 58–0. No. 6 USC returned to the Top Five after a 36–0 win over West Virginia. The next poll was No. 1 Syracuse, No. 2 Texas, No. 3 LSU, No. 4 USC, and No. 5 Mississippi.

November 14 No. 1 Syracuse exercised its top status, brushing off overmatched Colgate 71–0. No. 2 Texas lost to No. 18 TCU, 14–9, and No. 3 LSU returned to its winning ways, beating Mississippi State at home, 27–0. No. 4 USC beat Baylor 17–8. No. 5 Mississippi beat No. 9 Tennessee in Memphis, 37–7. The poll changed slightly: No. 1 Syracuse, No. 2 Mississippi, No. 3 LSU, No. 4 USC, and No. 5 Texas.

November 21 No. 1 Syracuse won at Boston University, 46–0, for its fifth shutout as it reached the 9–0 mark. No. 3 LSU beat Tulane 14–6, then accepted an invitation to play in the Sugar Bowl. No. 4 USC lost to rival UCLA, 10–3 and fell to 7th. No. 9 Wisconsin, which closed its season and clinched the Big Ten title with an 11–7 win at Minnesota, rose to 5th. No. 2 Mississippi and No. 5 Texas were idle. The next poll: No. 1 Syracuse, No. 2 Mississippi, No. 3 LSU, No. 4 Texas, and No. 5 Wisconsin.

On Thanksgiving Day, No. 4 Texas won 20–17 at Texas A&M. No. 1 Syracuse was idle as it prepared for its December 5 trip to Los Angeles to play UCLA. On Saturday, November 28, No. 2 Mississippi played its season ender against Mississippi State, in Starkville, and won 42–0. Both LSU and Ole Miss were invited to a rematch in New Orleans at the Sugar Bowl. A third SEC team, the No. 6 Georgia Bulldogs, beat Georgia Tech 21–14 in Atlanta and accepted a spot in the Orange Bowl. Because Oklahoma had played in the Orange Bowl the year before, a "no repeat" rule gave the Big 7 (Oklahoma State would join later) berth to 6–4 Missouri. The Rose Bowl matched No. 6 Wisconsin against No. 8 Washington. The penultimate poll was No. 1 Syracuse, No. 2 Mississippi, No. 3 LSU, No. 4 Texas, and No. 5 Georgia.

On December 5, No. 1 Syracuse closed its season with trip to the Los Angeles Coliseum to face the upset-minded (but 5–3–1) No. 17 UCLA Bruins In a nationally televised game, the Orangemen took a 14–0 lead and went on to win 36–8 to finish the season with a perfect 10–0 record. As the only unbeaten team among universities, Syracuse was voted No. 1 in the AP Poll (with 134 of 201 first-place votes) and in the UPI Coaches Poll, with 31 of the 35 first-place votes. The Orangemen prepared to play SWC champion Texas in the Cotton Bowl.

== Conference standings ==
=== Major conference standings ===
1959 Athletic Association of Western Universities football standings
	Conf.					Overall
Team	W		L		T	W		L		T
No. 8 Washington ^ +	3	–	1	–	0	10	–	1	–	0
No. 14 USC +	3	–	1	–	0	8	–	2	–	0
UCLA +	3	–	1	–	0	5	–	4	–	1
California	1	–	3	–	0	2	–	8	–	0
Stanford	0	–	4	–	0	3	–	7	–	0
+ – Conference co-champions; ^ – Selected as Rose Bowl representative; Rankings from AP poll

1959 Atlantic Coast Conference football standings
	Conf.					Overall
Team	W		L		T	W		L		T
No. 11 Clemson $	6	–	1	–	0	9	–	2	–	0
North Carolina	5	–	2	–	0	5	–	5	–	0
Maryland	4	–	2	–	0	5	–	5	–	0
South Carolina	4	–	3	–	0	6	–	4	–	0
Wake Forest	4	–	3	–	0	6	–	4	–	0
Duke	2	–	3	–	0	4	–	6	–	0
NC State	0	–	6	–	0	1	–	9	–	0
Virginia	0	–	5	–	0	0	–	10	–	0
$ – Conference champion; Rankings from AP poll

1959 Big Seven Conference football standings
	Conf.					Overall
Team	W		L		T	W		L		T
No. 15 Oklahoma $	5	–	1	–	0	7	–	3	–	0
No. 18 Missouri	4	–	2	–	0	6	–	5	–	0
Colorado	3	–	3	–	0	5	–	5	–	0
Iowa State	3	–	3	–	0	7	–	3	–	0
Kansas	3	–	3	–	0	5	–	5	–	0
Nebraska	2	–	4	–	0	4	–	6	–	0
Kansas State	1	–	5	–	0	2	–	8	–	0
$ – Conference champion; Rankings from AP Poll

1959 Big Ten Conference football standings
	Conf.					Overall
Team	W		L		T	W		L		T
No. 6 Wisconsin $	5	–	2	–	0	7	–	3	–	0
Michigan State	4	–	2	–	0	5	–	4	–	0
Purdue	4	–	2	–	1	5	–	2	–	2
No. 13 Illinois	4	–	2	–	1	5	–	3	–	1
Northwestern	4	–	3	–	0	6	–	3	–	0
Iowa	3	–	3	–	0	5	–	4	–	0
Michigan	3	–	4	–	0	4	–	5	–	0
Indiana	2	–	4	–	1	4	–	4	–	1
Ohio State	2	–	4	–	1	3	–	5	–	1
Minnesota	1	–	6	–	0	2	–	7	–	0
$ – Conference champion; Rankings from AP Poll

1959 Border Conference football standings
	Conf.					Overall
Team	W		L		T	W		L		T
Arizona State $	5	–	0	–	0	10	–	1	–	0
Arizona	2	–	1	–	0	4	–	6	–	0
New Mexico State	2	–	2	–	0	8	–	3	–	0
Hardin–Simmons	2	–	2	–	0	3	–	7	–	0
Texas Western	2	–	3	–	0	3	–	7	–	0
West Texas State	0	–	5	–	0	1	–	9	–	0
$ – Conference champion

1959 Ivy League football standings
	Conf.					Overall
Team	W		L		T	W		L		T
Penn $	6	–	1	–	0	7	–	1	–	1
Dartmouth	5	–	1	–	1	5	–	3	–	1
Harvard	4	–	3	–	0	6	–	3	–	0
Yale	4	–	3	–	0	6	–	3	–	0
Cornell	3	–	4	–	0	5	–	4	–	0
Princeton	3	–	4	–	0	4	–	5	–	0
Brown	1	–	5	–	1	2	–	6	–	1
Columbia	1	–	6	–	0	2	–	7	–	0
$ – Conference champion

1959 Missouri Valley Conference football standings
	Conf.					Overall
Team	W		L		T	W		L		T
North Texas State +	3	–	1	–	0	9	–	2	–	0
Houston +	3	–	1	–	0	3	–	7	–	0
Tulsa	2	–	2	–	0	5	–	5	–	0
Wichita	1	–	2	–	1	5	–	4	–	1
Cincinnati	0	–	3	–	1		5	–	4
+ – Conference co-champions

1959 Skyline Conference football standings
	Conf.					Overall
Team	W		L		T	W		L		T
No. 16 Wyoming $	7	–	0	–	0	9	–	1	–	0
Colorado State	5	–	2	–	0	6	–	4	–	0
New Mexico	4	–	2	–	0	7	–	3	–	0
Utah	3	–	2	–	0	5	–	5	–	0
Utah State	2	–	5	–	0	5	–	6	–	0
BYU	2	–	5	–	0	3	–	7	–	0
Denver	2	–	5	–	0	2	–	8	–	0
Montana	1	–	5	–	0	1	–	8	–	0
$ – Conference champion; Rankings from AP Poll

1959 Southeastern Conference football standings
	Conf.					Overall
Team	W		L		T	W		L		T
No. 5 Georgia $	7	–	0	–	0	10	–	1	–	0
No. 3 LSU	5	–	1	–	0	9	–	2	–	0
No. 2 Ole Miss #	5	–	1	–	0	10	–	1	–	0
No. 10 Alabama	4	–	1	–	2	7	–	2	–	2
Auburn	4	–	3	–	0	7	–	3	–	0
Vanderbilt	3	–	2	–	2	5	–	3	–	2
Georgia Tech	3	–	3	–	0	6	–	5	–	0
Tennessee	3	–	4	–	1	5	–	4	–	1
No. 19 Florida	2	–	4	–	0	5	–	4	–	1
Kentucky	1	–	6	–	0	4	–	6	–	0
Tulane	0	–	5	–	1	3	–	6	–	1
Mississippi State	0	–	7	–	0	2	–	7	–	0
$ – Conference champion; ^{#} Berryman, Billingsley, Dunkel, Sagarin national champion; Rankings from AP Poll

1959 Southern Conference football standings
	Conf.					Overall
Team	W		L		T	W		L		T
VMI $	5	–	0	–	1	8	–	1	–	1
The Citadel	5	–	1	–	0	8	–	2	–	0
Virginia Tech	3	–	1	–	0	6	–	4	–	0
Furman	3	–	2	–	0	3	–	7	–	0
Richmond	4	–	3	–	1	4	–	5	–	1
West Virginia	2	–	2	–	0	3	–	7	–	0
William & Mary	2	–	5	–	0	4	–	6	–	0
Davidson	0	–	5	–	0	1	–	8	–	0
George Washington	0	–	5	–	0	1	–	8	–	0
$ – Conference champion; Rankings from AP Poll

1959 Southwest Conference football standings
	Conf.					Overall
Team	W		L		T	W		L		T
No. 9 Arkansas +	5	–	1	–	0	9	–	2	–	0
No. 4 Texas +	5	–	1	–	0	9	–	2	–	0
No. 7 TCU +	5	–	1	–	0	8	–	3	–	0
SMU	2	–	3	–	1	5	–	4	–	1
Baylor	2	–	4	–	0	4	–	6	–	0
Rice	1	–	4	–	1	1	–	7	–	2
Texas A&M	0	–	6	–	0	3	–	7	–	0
+ – Conference co-champions; Rankings from AP Poll

=== Major independents ===
1959 Eastern major college football independents records
	Conf.			Overall
Team	W	L	T	W		L		T
No. 1 Syracuse		–		11	–	0	–	0
No. 12 Penn State		–		9	–	2	–	0
Holy Cross		–		6	–	4	–	0
No. 20 Pittsburgh		–		6	–	4	–	0
Boston College		–		5	–	4	–	0
Army		–		4	–	4	–	1
Boston University		–		4	–	5	–	0
Colgate		–		2	–	7	–	0
Villanova		–		1	–	9	–	0
Rankings from AP poll

1959 Midwestern major college football independents records
	Conf.			Overall
Team	W	L	T	W		L		T
Detroit		–		6	–	4	–	0
No. 17 Notre Dame		–		5	–	5	–	0
Dayton		–		3	–	7	–	0
Marquette		–		3	–	7	–	0
Rankings from AP poll

1959 Southern major college football independents records
	Conf.			Overall
Team	W	L	T	W		L		T
Miami (FL)		–		6	–	4	–	0
Oklahoma State		–		6	–	4	–	0
Navy		–		5	–	4	–	1
Florida State		–		4	–	6	–	0
Texas Tech		–		4	–	6	–	0

1959 Western major college football independents records
	Conf.			Overall
Team	W	L	T	W		L		T
Oregon		–		8	–	2	–	0
Washington State		–		6	–	4	–	0
Pacific (CA)		–		5	–	4	–	0
Air Force		–		5	–	4	–	1
San Jose State		–		4	–	6	–	0
Oregon State		–		3	–	7	–	0
Idaho		–		1	–	9	–	0

=== Minor conference standings ===
1959 Arkansas Intercollegiate Conference football standings
	Conf.					Overall
Team	W		L		T	W		L		T
No. 20 Arkansas State Teachers +	5	–	0	–	1	8	–	0	–	1
Henderson State +	5	–	0	–	1	6	–	2	–	1
Southern State (AR)	5	–	2	–	0	6	–	3	–	0
Arkansas Tech	4	–	3	–	0	4	–	3	–	0
Ouachita Baptist	2	–	4	–	0	3	–	7	–	0
Arkansas A&M	2	–	5	–	0	2	–	6	–	0
Hendrix	1	–	4	–	1	1	–	6	–	1
Ozarks	0	–	6	–	1	0	–	9	–	1
+ – Conference co-champions; Rankings from NAIA poll

1959 Badger-Gopher Conference football standings
	Conf.					Overall
Team	W		L		T	W		L		T
Lakeland +	3	–	1	–	0	3	–	2	–	1
Northland +	3	–	1	–	0	3	–	5	–	0
Northwestern (WI)	2	–	2	–	0	5	–	2	–	0
Bethel (MN)	1	–	3	–	0	1	–	7	–	0
Milton	1	–	3	–	0	?	–	?	–	?
+ – Conference co-champions

1959 California Collegiate Athletic Association football standings
	Conf.					Overall
Team	W		L		T	W		L		T
Fresno State $	5	–	0	–	0	7	–	3	–	0
Los Angeles State	3	–	2	–	0	7	–	3	–	0
Cal Poly	3	–	2	–	0	6	–	3	–	0
UC Santa Barbara	2	–	3	–	0	6	–	4	–	0
Long Beach State	2	–	3	–	0	4	–	5	–	0
San Diego State	0	–	5	–	0	1	–	6	–	1
$ – Conference champion

1959 Central Intercollegiate Athletic Association football standings
	Conf.					Overall
Team	W		L		T	W		L		T
North Carolina A&T $	5	–	0	–	0	6	–	2	–	0
Virginia Union	7	–	0	–	1	7	–	0	–	2
Virginia State	7	–	2	–	0	7	–	2	–	0
St. Augustine's	6	–	2	–	0	7	–	2	–	0
Winston-Salem State	5	–	2	–	0	6	–	2	–	0
Maryland State	6	–	1	–	0	6	–	1	–	1
Johnson C. Smith	5	–	4	–	0	5	–	4	–	0
North Carolina College	3	–	3	–	0	4	–	4	–	1
Saint Paul's (VA)	3	–	4	–	0	3	–	4	–	0
Hampton	4	–	4	–	0	4	–	4	–	1
Elizabeth City State	3	–	5	–	0	3	–	6	–	0
Howard	2	–	4	–	0	3	–	5	–	0
Lincoln (PA)	2	–	4	–	0	3	–	6	–	0
Fayetteville State	1	–	6	–	0	1	–	7	–	0
Shaw	1	–	6	–	1	1	–	6	–	1
Bluefield State	1	–	4	–	0	3	–	6	–	0
Delaware State	1	–	6	–	0	1	–	7	–	0
Morgan State	1	–	6	–	0	1	–	6	–	1
$ – Conference champion; Conference standings were based on the Dickinson System.

1959 Central Intercollegiate Conference football standings
	Conf.					Overall
Team	W		L		T	W		L		T
St. Benedict's $	5	–	0	–	0	7	–	3	–	0
Pittsburg State	4	–	1	–	0	6	–	3	–	0
Washburn	2	–	3	–	0	3	–	6	–	0
Emporia State	2	–	3	–	0	2	–	7	–	0
Fort Hays State	1	–	4	–	0	3	–	6	–	0
Omaha	1	–	4	–	0	1	–	7	–	0
$ – Conference champion

1959 College Conference of Illinois football standings
	Conf.					Overall
Team	W		L		T	W		L		T
Wheaton (IL) $	6	–	0	–	1	6	–	1	–	2
Illinois Wesleyan	5	–	2	–	0	6	–	3	–	0
Carroll (WI)	4	–	2	–	1	5	–	2	–	1
Augustana (IL)	4	–	3	–	0	5	–	3	–	0
North Central (IL)	3	–	2	–	2	4	–	3	–	2
Lake Forest	2	–	5	–	0	3	–	5	–	0
Millikin	2	–	5	–	0	2	–	6	–	0
Elmhurst	0	–	7	–	0	0	–	7	–	1
$ – Conference champion

1959 Eastern Intercollegiate Athletic Conference football standings
	Conf.					Overall
Team	W		L		T	W		L		T
Norfolk State $	5	–	1	–	0	7	–	1	–	1
Voorhees	4	–	1	–	1	?	–	?	–	?
Livingstone	3	–	1	–	1	5	–	3	–	1
South Carolina Trade	2	–	2	–	0	?	–	?	–	?
Morristown	2	–	3	–	1	?	–	?	–	?
Kittrell	0	–	3	–	1	?	–	?	–	?
Friendship	0	–	4	–	0	?	–	?	–	?
$ – Conference champion

1959 Evergreen Conference football standings
	Conf.					Overall
Team	W		L		T	W		L		T
No. 19 Whitworth $	4	–	1	–	0	9	–	1	–	0
Puget Sound	3	–	1	–	1	6	–	1	–	1
Central Washington	3	–	2	–	0	3	–	6	–	0
Western Washington	2	–	3	–	0	3	–	5	–	0
Eastern Washington	1	–	3	–	1	2	–	6	–	1
Pacific Lutheran	1	–	3	–	1	1	–	6	–	1
$ – Conference champion; Rankings from NAIA poll

1959 Far Western Conference football standings
	Conf.					Overall
Team	W		L		T	W		L		T
No. 17 San Francisco State $	5	–	0	–	0	10	–	0	–	0
Humboldt State	4	–	1	–	0	9	–	1	–	0
Nevada	3	–	2	–	0	4	–	3	–	0
Chico State	2	–	3	–	0	4	–	4	–	0
Sacramento State	1	–	4	–	0	2	–	7	–	0
UC Davis	0	–	5	–	0	1	–	8	–	0
$ – Conference champion; Rankings from UPI small college poll

1959 Frontier Conference football standings
	Conf.					Overall
Team	W		L		T	W		L		T
Arizona State–Flagstaff $	3	–	0	–	0	6	–	2	–	1
Panhandle A&M	2	–	1	–	0	4	–	5	–	1
New Mexico Western	0	–	2	–	1	3	–	3	–	1
New Mexico Highlands	0	–	2	–	1	2	–	5	–	2
$ – Conference champion

1959 Gulf States Conference football standings
	Conf.					Overall
Team	W		L		T	W		L		T
No. 7 Louisiana Tech $	5	–	0	–	0	9	–	1	–	0
McNeese State	2	–	3	–	0	6	–	3	–	0
Northwestern State	2	–	3	–	0	4	–	5	–	1
Southwestern Louisiana	2	–	3	–	0	4	–	5	–	0
Southeastern Louisiana	1	–	4	–	0	3	–	2	–	0
Northeast Louisiana State	1	–	4	–	0	2	–	8	–	0
$ – Conference champion; Rankings from NAIA poll

1959 Hoosier Conference football standings
	Conf.					Overall
Team	W		L		T	W		L		T
Anderson (IN) $	5	–	0	–	0	7	–	1	–	0
Taylor	3	–	2	–	0	6	–	3	–	0
Franklin (IN)	3	–	2	–	0	5	–	4	–	0
Hanover	2	–	3	–	0	2	–	6	–	1
Indiana Central	1	–	3	–	1	3	–	5	–	1
Manchester (IN)	0	–	4	–	1	3	–	5	–	1
+ – Conference co-champions

1959 Indiana Collegiate Conference football standings
	Conf.					Overall
Team	W		L		T	W		L		T
Butler $	6	–	0	–	0	9	–	0	–	0
Evansville	4	–	2	–	0	6	–	3	–	0
Indiana State	3	–	3	–	0	5	–	3	–	0
Saint Joseph's (IN)	3	–	3	–	0	4	–	4	–	0
Valparaiso	3	–	3	–	0	5	–	4	–	0
DePauw	1	–	5	–	0	1	–	7	–	1
Ball State	1	–	5	–	0	1	–	7	–	0
$ – Conference champion

1959 Interstate Intercollegiate Athletic Conference football standings
	Conf.					Overall
Team	W		L		T	W		L		T
No. 2 Western Illinois $	6	–	0	–	0	9	–	0	–	0
No. 17 Northern Illinois State	4	–	2	–	0	7	–	2	–	0
Central Michigan	4	–	2	–	0	7	–	3	–	0
Southern Illinois	4	–	2	–	0	5	–	4	–	0
Eastern Illinois	1	–	4	–	1	3	–	5	–	1
Eastern Michigan	1	–	5	–	0	1	–	7	–	0
Illinois State Normal	0	–	5	–	1	3	–	5	–	1
$ – Conference champion; Rankings from NAIA poll

1959 Iowa Conference football standings
	Conf.					Overall
Team	W		L		T	W		L		T
Wartburg $	8	–	0	–	0	8	–	1	–	0
Buena Vista	7	–	1	–	0	8	–	1	–	0
Luther	6	–	2	–	0	6	–	3	–	0
Iowa Wesleyan	5	–	3	–	0	5	–	4	–	0
Dubuque	4	–	4	–	0	5	–	4	–	0
Parsons	3	–	5	–	0	3	–	7	–	0
Central (IA)	2	–	6	–	0	3	–	6	–	0
Upper Iowa	1	–	7	–	0	1	–	8	–	0
Simpson (IA)	0	–	8	–	0	0	–	8	–	0
$ – Conference champion

1959 Kansas Collegiate Athletic Conference football standings
	Conf.					Overall
Team	W		L		T	W		L		T
College of Emporia $	7	–	0	–	0	9	–	1	–	0
Ottawa	6	–	1	–	0	6	–	3	–	0
Baker	5	–	2	–	0	5	–	4	–	0
Kansas Wesleyan	3	–	3	–	1	3	–	5	–	1
McPherson	3	–	4	–	0	4	–	5	–	0
Bethany (KS)	2	–	4	–	1	4	–	4	–	1
Friends	1	–	6	–	0	1	–	8	–	0
Bethel (KS)	0	–	7	–	0	0	–	9	–	0
$ – Conference champion

1959 Lone Star Conference football standings
	Conf.					Overall
Team	W		L		T	W		L		T
No. 5 Texas A&I +^	6	–	1	–	0	12	–	1	–	0
No. 4 East Texas State +	6	–	1	–	0	9	–	1	–	0
Lamar Tech	4	–	3	–	0	8	–	3	–	0
Stephen F. Austin	4	–	3	–	0	4	–	6	–	1
Sam Houston State	3	–	4	–	0	5	–	5	–	0
Howard Payne	3	–	4	–	0	3	–	7	–	0
Southwest Texas State	2	–	5	–	0	4	–	6	–	0
Sul Ross	0	–	7	–	0	0	–	9	–	0
+ – Conference co-champions; ^ – NAIA playoff participant; Rankings from NAIA poll

1959 Mason–Dixon Conference football standings
	Conf.					Overall
Team	W		L		T	W		L		T
Johns Hopkins $	2	–	1	–	0	7	–	1	–	0
Western Maryland	2	–	1	–	1	5	–	2	–	2
Hampden–Sydney	2	–	1	–	1	5	–	3	–	1
Randolph–Macon	2	–	2	–	1	4	–	2	–	3
Bridgewater	1	–	3	–	0	2	–	6	–	0
Gallaudet	0	–	2	–	0	3	–	3	–	0
$ – Conference champion; Conference standings were based on the Dickinson Scoring System.

1959 Michigan Intercollegiate Athletic Association football standings
	Conf.					Overall
Team	W		L		T	W		L		T
No. 3 Hillsdale $^	6	–	0	–	0	8	–	2	–	0
Hope	5	–	1	–	0	8	–	1	–	0
Alma	4	–	2	–	0	5	–	4	–	0
Albion	3	–	3	–	0	4	–	4	–	0
Olivet	1	–	5	–	0	3	–	5	–	0
Adrian	1	–	5	–	0	2	–	6	–	0
Kalamazoo	1	–	5	–	0	2	–	6	–	0
$ – Conference champion; ^ – NAIA playoff participant; Rankings from NAIA poll

1959 Mid-American Conference football standings
	Conf.					Overall
Team	W		L		T	W		L		T
No. 1 Bowling Green $	6	–	0	–	0	9	–	0	–	0
No. 9 Ohio	4	–	2	–	0	7	–	2	–	0
No. 19 Miami (OH)	3	–	2	–	0	5	–	4	–	0
Kent State	3	–	3	–	0	5	–	3	–	0
Western Michigan	3	–	3	–	0	4	–	5	–	0
Marshall	1	–	4	–	0	1	–	8	–	0
Toledo	0	–	6	–	0	2	–	6	–	1
$ – Conference champion; Rankings from UPI small college poll

1959 Mid-Ohio League football standings
	Conf.					Overall
Team	W		L		T	W		L		T
Bluffton $	5	–	0	–	0	6	–	3	–	0
Findlay	3	–	1	–	1	5	–	3	–	1
Ashland	3	–	1	–	1	4	–	3	–	2
Ohio Northern	2	–	3	–	0	3	–	6	–	0
Defiance	1	–	4	–	0	1	–	8	–	0
Wilmington (OH)	0	–	5	–	0	1	–	6	–	0
$ – Conference champion

1959 Middle Atlantic Conference football standings
	Conf.					Overall
Team	W		L		T	W		L		T
University Division
Delaware x	5	–	0	–	0	8	–	1	–	0
Gettysburg	3	–	2	–	0	5	–	4	–	0
Lafayette	4	–	3	–	0	5	–	4	–	0
Bucknell	3	–	3	–	0	4	–	5	–	0
Rutgers	2	–	2	–	0	6	–	3	–	0
Lehigh	2	–	3	–	0	4	–	5	–	0
Temple	0	–	5	–	0	0	–	9	–	0
Muhlenberg *	1	–	2	–	0	3	–	6	–	0
Northern College Division
Albright x	6	–	1	–	0	7	–	3	–	0
Juniata	5	–	1	–	0	7	–	1	–	0
Wagner	5	–	1	–	0	6	–	2	–	0
Lebanon Valley	3	–	2	–	0	5	–	3	–	0
Susquehanna	3	–	2	–	0	4	–	3	–	0
Moravian	2	–	4	–	0	3	–	5	–	0
Wilkes	2	–	5	–	0	2	–	5	–	0
Lycoming	1	–	4	–	0	3	–	5	–	0
Scranton *	3	–	1	–	0	5	–	4	–	0
Southern College Division
Johns Hopkins x	6	–	0	–	0	7	–	1	–	0
Pennsylvania Military	6	–	2	–	0	6	–	2	–	0
Western Maryland	3	–	2	–	1	5	–	2	–	2
Ursinus	2	–	5	–	0	2	–	6	–	0
Dickinson	1	–	5	–	0	1	–	7	–	0
Haverford	0	–	5	–	0	1	–	5	–	0
Drexel	0	–	5	–	0	1	–	6	–	0
Franklin & Marshall *	1	–	2	–	1	4	–	3	–	1
Swarthmore *	1	–	3	–	0	2	–	5	–	0
West Chester *	0	–	0	–	0	7	–	1	–	0
x – Division champion/co-champions; * – Ineligible for championship due to insufficient conference games

1959 Midwest Athletic Association football standings
	Conf.					Overall
Team	W		L		T	W		L		T
No. 2 Tennessee A&I $	3	–	0	–	0	9	–	1	–	0
No. 21 Kentucky State	1	–	1	–	1	3	–	5	–	1
No. 22 Central State (OH)	1	–	2	–	0	4	–	3	–	1
No. 11 Lincoln (MO)	0	–	2	–	1	7	–	2	–	1
$ – Conference champion; Rankings from Associated Negro Press

1959 Midwest Conference football standings
	Conf.					Overall
Team	W		L		T	W		L		T
Coe $	8	–	0	–	0	8	–	0	–	0
Cornell (IA)	7	–	1	–	0	7	–	1	–	0
St. Olaf	6	–	2	–	0	6	–	2	–	0
Beloit	4	–	4	–	0	4	–	4	–	0
Lawrence	4	–	4	–	0	4	–	4	–	0
Ripon	4	–	4	–	0	4	–	4	–	0
Carleton	3	–	5	–	0	3	–	5	–	0
Knox	2	–	6	–	0	2	–	6	–	0
Grinnell	1	–	7	–	0	1	–	7	–	0
Monmouth (IL)	1	–	7	–	0	1	–	7	–	0
$ – Conference champion

1959 Minnesota Intercollegiate Athletic Conference football standings
	Conf.					Overall
Team	W		L		T	W		L		T
Gustavus Adolphus $	7	–	0	–	0	8	–	1	–	0
Concordia (MN)	6	–	1	–	0	7	–	2	–	0
Minnesota–Duluth	4	–	2	–	1	5	–	2	–	1
Saint John's (MN)	4	–	3	–	0	5	–	3	–	0
St. Thomas (MN)	3	–	3	–	1	4	–	3	–	1
Augsburg	2	–	5	–	0	3	–	5	–	0
Macalester	1	–	6	–	0	2	–	6	–	0
Hamline	0	–	7	–	0	0	–	8	–	0
$ – Conference champion

1959 Missouri College Athletic Union football standings
	Conf.					Overall
Team	W		L		T	W		L		T
No. 15 William Jewell $	3	–	0	–	0	8	–	1	–	0
Missouri Valley	2	–	1	–	0	7	–	2	–	0
Culver–Stockton	1	–	2	–	1	6	–	3	–	1
Tarkio	1	–	2	–	1	3	–	5	–	1
Central (MO)	0	–	2	–	0	0	–	8	–	0
$ – Conference champion; Rankings from NAIA poll

1959 Missouri Intercollegiate Athletic Association football standings
	Conf.					Overall
Team	W		L		T	W		L		T
SE Missouri State $	5	–	0	–	0	7	–	2	–	0
NE Missouri State	3	–	1	–	1	7	–	1	–	1
NW Missouri State	2	–	2	–	1	3	–	3	–	2
Missouri–Rolla	2	–	3	–	0	4	–	4	–	0
SW Missouri State	1	–	4	–	0	4	–	5	–	0
Central Missouri State	1	–	4	–	0	3	–	7	–	0
$ – Conference champion

1959 Montana Collegiate Conference football standings
	Conf.					Overall
Team	W		L		T	W		L		T
Eastern Montana +	4	–	1	–	0	5	–	2	–	0
Rocky Mountain +	4	–	1	–	0	4	–	2	–	0
Carroll (MT)	3	–	2	–	0	4	–	4	–	0
Western Montana	3	–	2	–	0	5	–	2	–	1
Northern Montana	1	–	4	–	0	1	–	6	–	0
Montana Mines	0	–	5	–	0	?	–	?	–	?
+ – Conference co-champions

1959 Nebraska College Conference football standings
	Conf.					Overall
Team	W		L		T	W		L		T
Kearney State $	7	–	0	–	0	8	–	2	–	0
Peru State	6	–	1	–	0	7	–	1	–	0
Chadron State	5	–	2	–	0	6	–	2	–	0
Doane	5	–	3	–	1	5	–	3	–	1
Nebraska Wesleyan	4	–	3	–	1	5	–	3	–	1
Wayne State (NE)	4	–	3	–	1	4	–	4	–	1
Hastings	2	–	2	–	3	3	–	2	–	3
Concordia (NE)	2	–	6	–	0	3	–	6	–	0
Dana	0	–	7	–	0	0	–	8	–	0
Midland	0	–	8	–	0	0	–	9	–	0
$ – Conference champion

1959 North Central Conference football standings
	Conf.					Overall
Team	W		L		T	W		L		T
Augustana (SD) $	4	–	1	–	1	6	–	2	–	1
North Dakota State	3	–	2	–	1	4	–	4	–	1
South Dakota	3	–	2	–	1	4	–	5	–	1
Iowa State Teachers	3	–	3	–	0	6	–	3	–	0
Morningside	3	–	3	–	0	5	–	4	–	0
South Dakota State	2	–	4	–	0	2	–	7	–	0
North Dakota	1	–	4	–	1	2	–	5	–	1
$ – Conference champion

1959 North Dakota Intercollegiate Conference football standings
	Conf.					Overall
Team	W		L		T	W		L		T
Mayville State $	5	–	0	–	1	6	–	0	–	1
Dickinson State	4	–	2	–	0	5	–	2	–	0
Minot State	2	–	2	–	2	3	–	2	–	2
Valley City State	3	–	3	–	0	4	–	3	–	0
Wahpeton Science	2	–	2	–	2	2	–	2	–	2
Jamestown	1	–	4	–	1	2	–	5	–	1
Ellendale	1	–	5	–	0	2	–	5	–	0
$ – Conference champion

1959 North State Conference football standings
	Conf.					Overall
Team	W		L		T	W		L		T
No. Lenoir Rhyne $^	6	–	0	–	0	10	–	1	–	0
Appalachian State	5	–	1	–	0	6	–	4	–	0
Western Carolina	4	–	2	–	0	7	–	2	–	1
East Carolina	3	–	3	–	0	5	–	6	–	0
Catawba	2	–	4	–	0	2	–	7	–	1
Guilford	1	–	5	–	0	2	–	7	–	0
Elon	0	–	6	–	0	1	–	9	–	0
$ – Conference champion; ^ – NAIA playoff participant; Rankings from NAIA poll

1959 Northern State College Conference football standings
	Conf.					Overall
Team	W		L		T	W		L		T
Bemidji State +	4	–	1	–	0	6	–	1	–	1
Michigan Tech +	4	–	1	–	0	6	–	2	–	0
Mankato State +	4	–	1	–	0	6	–	3	–	0
Winona State	2	–	3	–	0	2	–	5	–	0
St. Cloud State	1	–	4	–	0	2	–	6	–	0
Moorhead State	0	–	5	–	0	0	–	9	–	0
+ – Conference co-champions

1959 Northwest Conference football standings
	Conf.					Overall
Team	W		L		T	W		L		T
Willamette $	3	–	1	–	1	5	–	3	–	1
Lewis & Clark	3	–	2	–	0	4	–	5	–	0
College of Idaho	2	–	2	–	1	6	–	3	–	1
Whitman	2	–	3	–	0	5	–	3	–	0
Pacific (OR)	2	–	3	–	0	4	–	5	–	0
Linfield	1	–	2	–	2	4	–	3	–	2
$ – Conference champion

1959 Ohio Valley Conference football standings
	Conf.					Overall
Team	W		L		T	W		L		T
No. 3 Middle Tennessee +	5	–	0	–	1	10	–	0	–	1
Tennessee Tech +	5	–	0	–	1	7	–	2	–	2
East Tennessee State	4	–	2	–	0	7	–	3	–	0
Western Kentucky	3	–	3	–	0	5	–	4	–	0
Eastern Kentucky	2	–	4	–	0	3	–	6	–	0
Morehead State	1	–	5	–	0	3	–	6	–	0
Murray State	0	–	6	–	0	0	–	10	–	0
+ – Conference co-champions; Rankings from UPI small college poll

1959 Mid-Ohio League football standings
	Conf.					Overall
Team	W		L		T	W		L		T
Bluffton $	5	–	0	–	0	6	–	3	–	0
Findlay	3	–	1	–	1	5	–	3	–	1
Ashland	3	–	1	–	1	4	–	3	–	2
Ohio Northern	2	–	3	–	0	3	–	6	–	0
Defiance	1	–	4	–	0	1	–	8	–	0
Wilmington (OH)	0	–	5	–	0	1	–	6	–	0
$ – Conference champion

1959 Oklahoma Collegiate Conference football standings
	Conf.					Overall
Team	W		L		T	W		L		T
Langston $	6	–	0	–	0	7	–	1	–	0
No. 11 Central State (OK)	5	–	1	–	0	8	–	1	–	0
East Central	4	–	2	–	0	8	–	4	–	0
SW Oklahoma State	3	–	3	–	0	3	–	6	–	1
Northeastern State	2	–	4	–	0	3	–	6	–	0
NW Oklahoma State	1	–	5	–	0	4	–	5	–	0
SE Oklahoma State	0	–	6	–	0	0	–	9	–	0
$ – Conference champion; Rankings from NAIA poll

1959 Oregon Collegiate Conference football standings
	Conf.					Overall
Team	W		L		T	W		L		T
Oregon Tech $	4	–	0	–	0	6	–	2	–	0
Southern Oregon	3	–	1	–	0	4	–	5	–	0
Eastern Oregon	2	–	2	–	0	3	–	6	–	0
Portland State	1	–	3	–	0	1	–	8	–	0
Oregon College	0	–	4	–	0	1	–	7	–	0
$ – Conference champion

1959 Prairie College Conference football standings
	Conf.					Overall
Team	W		L		T	W		L		T
Illinois College +	1	–	0	–	1	3	–	2	–	2
Principia +	1	–	0	–	1	4	–	3	–	1
Rose Poly	0	–	2	–	0	2	–	4	–	1
+ – Conference co-champions

1959 Pennsylvania State Teachers College Conference football standings
	Conf.					Overall
Team	W		L		T	W		L		T
No. 10/10 West Chester $	5	–	1	–	0	7	–	1	–	0
California (PA)	4	–	2	–	0	6	–	2	–	0
Shippensburg	5	–	2	–	0	6	–	2	–	0
Clarion	4	–	1	–	1	6	–	1	–	1
East Stroudsburg	3	–	2	–	0	5	–	2	–	2
Lock Haven	5	–	2	–	0	6	–	2	–	0
Millersville	3	–	3	–	0	5	–	4	–	0
Slippery Rock	2	–	3	–	0	2	–	6	–	0
Edinboro	2	–	3	–	1	3	–	4	–	1
Bloomsburg	2	–	4	–	0	5	–	2	–	1
Indiana (PA)	1	–	3	–	1	3	–	4	–	1
Mansfield	1	–	4	–	2	2	–	4	–	2
Kutztown	1	–	2	–	1	3	–	4	–	1
Cheyney	0	–	6	–	0	1	–	7	–	0
$ – Conference champion; Conference standings were based on the Saylor system of ratings.; Rankings from NAIA poll and UPI small college poll

1959 Presidents' Athletic Conference football standings
	Conf.					Overall
Team	W		L		T	W		L		T
John Carroll $	6	–	0	–	0	7	–	0	–	0
Allegheny	4	–	1	–	0	6	–	2	–	0
Wayne State (MI)	4	–	1	–	0	4	–	3	–	0
Western Reserve	3	–	2	–	0	3	–	4	–	0
Thiel	1	–	4	–	1	1	–	5	–	1
Case Tech	1	–	4	–	0	1	–	6	–	0
Bethany (WV)	1	–	4	–	0	1	–	8	–	0
Washington & Jefferson	0	–	4	–	1	1	–	6	–	0
$ – Conference champion

1959 Rocky Mountain Conference football standings
	Conf.					Overall
Team	W		L		T	W		L		T
Idaho State $	3	–	0	–	0	6	–	2	–	0
Adams State	3	–	1	–	0	8	–	1	–	0
Colorado State–Greeley	3	–	2	–	0	7	–	2	–	0
Colorado College	2	–	3	–	0	4	–	4	–	0
Colorado Mines	1	–	3	–	0	4	–	6	–	0
Western State (CO)	1	–	4	–	0	3	–	5	–	0
$ – Conference champion

1959 South Central Athletic Conference football standings
	Conf.					Overall
Team	W		L		T	W		L		T
Mississippi Vocational $	3	–	1	–	0	3	–	4	–	1
Mississippi Industrial	2	–	1	–	0	4	–	5	–	0
Paul Quinn	1	–	2	–	1	4	–	4	–	1
Alcorn A&M	2	–	2	–	0	3	–	5	–	0
Leland	0	–	2	–	1	1	–	4	–	3
$ – Conference champion

1959 South Dakota Intercollegiate Conference football standings
	Conf.					Overall
Team	W		L		T	W		L		T
No. 14 Huron +	7	–	1	–	0	9	–	1	–	0
Southern State (SD) +	7	–	1	–	0	7	–	2	–	0
General Beadle	5	–	2	–	1	5	–	2	–	1
Northern State	5	–	3	–	0	5	–	4	–	0
Dakota Wesleyan	3	–	4	–	1	3	–	5	–	1
South Dakota Tech	3	–	4	–	0	3	–	4	–	0
Sioux Falls	2	–	5	–	0	2	–	5	–	0
Black Hills	1	–	6	–	0	1	–	6	–	0
Yankton	0	–	7	–	0	0	–	8	–	0
+ – Conference co-champions; Rankings from NAIA poll

1959 Southeastern Athletic Conference football standings
	Conf.					Overall
Team	W		L		T	W		L		T
Albany State $	3	–	1	–	0	4	–	5	–	0
Claflin	3	–	1	–	0	6	–	3	–	0
Savannah State	2	–	1	–	1	3	–	4	–	2
Morris	1	–	2	–	1	2	–	6	–	1
Paine	0	–	4	–	0	1	–	6	–	0
$ – Conference champion; Standings were based on Dickinson System ratings.

1959 Southern California Intercollegiate Athletic Conference football standings
	Conf.					Overall
Team	W		L		T	W		L		T
No. 18 Whittier $	5	–	0	–	0	8	–	2	–	0
Redlands	4	–	1	–	0	6	–	4	–	0
Pomona	3	–	2	–	0	5	–	4	–	0
Occidental	2	–	3	–	0	3	–	5	–	0
Caltech	1	–	4	–	0	1	–	7	–	0
Claremont-Mudd	0	–	5	–	0	1	–	7	–	1
$ – Conference champion; Rankings from NAIA poll

1959 Southern Intercollegiate Athletic Conference football standings
	Conf.					Overall
Team	W		L		T	W		L		T
No. 13 Florida A&M $	5	–	0	–	0	10	–	0	–	0
Morehouse	5	–	1	–	0	5	–	2	–	1
Clark (GA)	3	–	1	–	2	5	–	1	–	2
Morris Brown	4	–	2	–	0	6	–	3	–	0
Alabama State	4	–	2	–	1	4	–	2	–	2
Bethune–Cookman	4	–	2	–	0	6	–	2	–	0
Knoxville	4	–	2	–	0	4	–	3	–	0
South Carolina State	3	–	3	–	0	4	–	5	–	0
Lane	3	–	2	–	0	4	–	4	–	0
Tuskegee	2	–	4	–	1	4	–	4	–	1
Benedict	2	–	4	–	0	5	–	5	–	0
Xavier (LA)	2	–	4	–	0	3	–	5	–	0
Allen	1	–	3	–	1	2	–	5	–	2
Fort Valley State	1	–	3	–	1	5	–	3	–	1
Fisk	1	–	5	–	0	3	–	5	–	0
Alabama A&M	0	–	6	–	0	1	–	7	–	0
$ – Conference champion; Standings were based on Dickinson System ratings.

1959 Southwestern Athletic Conference football standings
	Conf.					Overall
Team		W		L			W		L
Southern $	7	–	0	–	0	8	–	2	–	0
No. 16 Prairie View A&M	6	–	1	–	0	9	–	2	–	0
Texas Southern	5	–	2	–	0	7	–	3	–	0
Jackson State	4	–	3	–	0	6	–	4	–	0
Arkansas AM&N	2	–	5	–	0	4	–	6	–	0
Grambling	2	–	5	–	0	4	–	6	–	0
Texas College	2	–	5	–	0	4	–	6	–	0
Wiley	0	–	7	–	0	2	–	8	–	0
$ – Conference champion; Rankings from NAIA poll

1959 Virginia Little Eight Conference football standings
	Conf.					Overall
Team	W		L		T	W		L		T
Emory and Henry *	1	–	0	–	0	7	–	3	–	0
Randolph–Macon $	1	–	0	–	1	4	–	2	–	3
Hampden–Sydney	1	–	1	–	1	5	–	3	–	1
Bridgewater	0	–	2	–	0	2	–	6	–	0
$ – Conference champion; * – Emory and Henry did not play enough conference games to be eligible for the championship.

1959 West Penn Conference football standings
	Conf.					Overall
Team	W		L		T	W		L		T
Westminster (PA) $	5	–	0	–	0	6	–	2	–	0
Carnegie Tech	3	–	1	–	0	7	–	1	–	0
Geneva	2	–	2	–	0	7	–	2	–	0
Saint Vincent	1	–	3	–	0	3	–	4	–	0
Grove City	0	–	2	–	1	3	–	5	–	1
Waynesburg	0	–	3	–	1	1	–	6	–	2
$ – Conference champion

1959 West Virginia Intercollegiate Athletic Conference football standings
	Conf.					Overall
Team	W		L		T	W		L		T
Eastern Division
West Liberty State x	4	–	3	–	0	4	–	5	–	0
Shepherd	3	–	2	–	0	4	–	4	–	0
West Virginia State	2	–	2	–	0	2	–	5	–	1
Davis & Elkins	1	–	6	–	0	1	–	6	–	0
Salem	0	–	8	–	0	0	–	8	–	0
Bluefield State *	0	–	1	–	0	3	–	6	–	0
Western Division
No. 12 Fairmont State x$	8	–	0	–	0	8	–	1	–	0
West Virginia Tech	4	–	1	–	0	7	–	1	–	0
Potomac State	4	–	2	–	0	7	–	2	–	0
West Virginia Wesleyan	5	–	2	–	0	6	–	2	–	0
Glenville State	4	–	3	–	0	4	–	3	–	0
Concord	2	–	6	–	0	2	–	7	–	0
Bethany (WV) *	0	–	1	–	0	1	–	8	–	0
$ – Conference champion; x – Division champion/co-champions; * – Did not qualify for conference standings Salem forfeited seven conference wins, over Concord, Davis & Elkins, Glenville State, Potomac State, West Liberty State, West Virginia State, and West Virginia Wesleyan. Conference standings based on power ratings; Rankings from NAIA poll

1959 Wisconsin State College Conference football standings
	Conf.					Overall
Team	W		L		T	W		L		T
Whitewater State $	6	–	0	–	0	7	–	1	–	1
La Crosse State	5	–	1	–	0	8	–	1	–	0
Superior State	3	–	1	–	2	4	–	3	–	2
Stevens Point State	3	–	3	–	1	4	–	3	–	1
Milwaukee	3	–	3	–	0	4	–	4	–	0
Oshkosh State	2	–	3	–	2	3	–	3	–	2
Eau Claire State	2	–	4	–	1	2	–	5	–	1
River Falls State	2	–	4	–	1	2	–	6	–	1
Platteville State	2	–	4	–	0	2	–	6	–	0
Stout State	0	–	5	–	1	2	–	5	–	1
$ – Conference champion

1959 Yankee Conference football standings
	Conf.					Overall
Team	W		L		T	W		L		T
Connecticut $	4	–	0	–	0	6	–	3	–	0
UMass	2	–	2	–	0	3	–	5	–	1
Maine	1	–	2	–	2	3	–	3	–	2
New Hampshire	1	–	2	–	1	3	–	3	–	2
Rhode Island	1	–	2	–	1	3	–	5	–	1
Vermont	0	–	1	–	0	4	–	3	–	0
$ – Conference champion

1959 NAIA independents football records
	Conf.			Overall
Team	W	L	T	W		L		T
Austin		–		8	–	2	–	0
No. 9 McMurry		–		8	–	2	–	0
No. 8 Southern Connecticut State ^		–		8	–	2	–	0
Georgetown (KY)		–		5	–	2	–	0
Oklahoma Panhandle State		–		4	–	5	–	1
Eastern New Mexico		–		4	–	6	–	0
La Verne		–		3	–	6	–	0
Carson–Newman		–		1	–	7	–	1
Earlham		–		1	–	7	–	0
^ – NAIA playoff participant; Rankings from NAIA poll

=== Non-major independents ===
1959 Eastern non-major college football independents records
	Conf.			Overall
Team	W	L	T	W		L		T
Hofstra		–		9	–	0	–	0
Buffalo		–		8	–	1	–	0
Carnegie Tech		–		7	–	1	–	0
No. 8 Southern Connecticut State ^		–		8	–	2	–	0
Northeastern		–		1	–	6	–	1
^ – NAIA playoff participant; Rankings from NAIA poll

1959 Midwestern non-major college football independents records
	Conf.			Overall
Team	W	L	T	W		L		T
North Park		–		6	–	1	–	1
Northern Michigan		–		6	–	2	–	0
Carthage		–		5	–	3	–	1
Baldwin–Wallace		–		4	–	4	–	0
Xavier		–		4	–	6	–	0
Wabash		–		3	–	5	–	1
Rose Poly		–		2	–	4	–	1
Drake		–		2	–	7	–	0
Washington University		–		1	–	7	–	0
St. Norbert		–		0	–	6	–	1

1959 Southern non-major college football independents records
	Conf.			Overall
Team	W	L	T	W		L		T
Howard (AL)		–		9	–	1	–	0
Louisville		–		6	–	4	–	0
Memphis State		–		6	–	4	–	0
Mississippi Southern		–		6	–	4	–	0
Arlington State		–		4	–	3	–	0
Sewanee		–		4	–	3	–	1
Abilene Christian		–		5	–	5	–	0
Washington and Lee		–		3	–	4	–	1
Arkansas State		–		3	–	6	–	0
Trinity (TX)		–		3	–	6	–	0
Chattanooga		–		3	–	7	–	0
Tampa		–		3	–	7	–	0

1959 Western non-major college football independents records
	Conf.			Overall
Team	W	L	T	W		L		T
Cal Poly Pomona		–		7	–	1	–	1
Santa Clara		–		4	–	1	–	0
UC Riverside		–		5	–	2	–	0
Montana State		–		6	–	3	–	0
Hawaii		–		3	–	6	–	0
Pepperdine		–		2	–	5	–	1

== Bowl games ==
=== Major bowls ===
Friday, January 1, 1960

COTTON	No. 1 Syracuse Orangemen	23	No. 4 Texas Longhorns	14
SUGAR	No. 2 Mississippi Rebels	21	No. 3 LSU Tigers	0
ROSE	No. 8 Washington Huskies	44	No. 6 Wisconsin Badgers	8
ORANGE	No. 5 Georgia Bulldogs	14	No. 18 Missouri Tigers	0

Behind future Heisman Trophy winner Ernie Davis, the Orangemen proved the voters' decision to name them national champions in the final polls was a wise one. It was the first Cotton Bowl for the Longhorns under coach Darrell Royal, who guided Texas to national championships in 1963, 1969, and 1970, and compiled a career record of 167–47–5 (.774) in Austin from 1957 through 1976.

Ole Miss systematically demolished LSU in the Sugar Bowl. LSU was Ole Miss's sole loss of the regular season. The Rebels outgained the Bayou Bengals and Heisman Trophy winner Billy Cannon 373–74 in front of a largely pro-LSU crowd of over 83,000 at Tulane Stadium. Immediately following the game, Cannon signed a contract with the Houston Oilers of the fledgling American Football League, spurning the Los Angeles Rams and general manager Pete Rozelle, who would become the Commissioner of the National Football League in late-January.

=== Other bowls ===
BOWL	Location	Date	Winner	Score	Runner-up
SUN	El Paso, TX	December 31	New Mexico State	28–8	North Texas State
GATOR	Jacksonville, FL	January 2	No. 9 Arkansas	14–7	Georgia Tech
BLUEBONNET	Houston, TX	December 19	No. 11 Clemson	23–7	No. 7 TCU
LIBERTY	Philadelphia, PA	December 19	No. 12 Penn State	7–0	No. 10 Alabama

- Prior to the 1975 season, the Big Ten and AAWU (later Pac-8) conferences allowed only one postseason participant each, for the Rose Bowl.

=== NAIA postseason ===
Semifinals; December 5, 1959
Hillsdale	0
Texas A&I*	20
Southern Connecticut State	20
Lenoir Rhyne*	47

Championship; December 19, 1959; Holiday Bowl
Texas A&I	20
Lenoir Rhyne	7

== Rankings ==
=== Major college polls ===
Final polls were released in the first week of December.

AP writers poll
Rank	Team	1st	Points
1	Syracuse	134	1768
2	Ole Miss	47	1444
3	LSU	6	1284
4	Texas	1	1028
5	Georgia	3	876
6	Wisconsin	5	724
7	TCU	-	580
8	Washington	-	428
9	Arkansas	-	301
10	Alabama	5	301
11	Clemson	-	239
12	Penn State	-	190
13	Illinois	-	104
14	USC	-	94
15	Oklahoma	-	68
16	Wyoming	-	60
17	Notre Dame	-	46
18	Missouri	-	40
19	Florida	-	34
20	Pittsburgh	-	30

UPI coaches poll
Rank	Team	1st	Points
1	Syracuse	31	342
2	Ole Miss	3	285
3	LSU	-	258
4	Texas	-	247
5	Georgia	-	184
6	Wisconsin	-	157
7	Washington	1	121
8	TCU	-	103
9	Arkansas	-	65
10	Penn State	-	42
11	Clemson	-	38
12	Illinois	-	19
13	Alabama	-	17
13	USC	-	17
15	Auburn	-	8
16	Michigan State	-	5
17	Oklahoma	-	4
18	Notre Dame	-	3
19	Florida	-	2
19	Pittsburgh	-	2
19	Missouri	-	2

=== Small college poll ===
In 1959, United Press International (UPI) conducted its "small college" coaches' poll for the second time; they voted the Bowling Green Falcons, who had a 9–0 record and outscored their opponents 274–83, as the number one team.

United Press International (coaches) final poll
Published on November 27

Rank	School	Record	No. 1 votes	Total points
1	Bowling Green	9–0	23	407
2	Mississippi Southern	6–3	5	247
3	Middle Tennessee	9–0	2	231
4	Delaware	8–1	1	211
5	East Texas State	9–1		179
6	Western Illinois	9–0		152
7	Memphis State	5–4		86
8	Louisiana Tech	8–1	2	81
9	Ohio	7–2		76
10	West Chester	7–1		71

== Award season ==
=== Heisman Trophy voting ===
The Heisman Trophy is given to the year's most outstanding player

Player	School	Position	1st	2nd	3rd	Total
Billy Cannon	LSU	HB	519	147	78	1,929
Richie Lucas	Penn State	QB	97	109	104	613
Don Meredith	SMU	QB	26	67	74	286
Bill Burrell	Illinois	G	23	47	33	196
Charlie Flowers	Ole Miss	FB	11	58	44	193
Dean Look	Michigan State	HB	23	41	25	176
Dale Hackbart	Wisconsin	QB	19	21	35	134
Dwight Nichols	Iowa State	HB	21	25	13	126
Monty Stickles	Notre Dame	E	16	21	36	126
Ron Burton	Northwestern	HB	10	28	36	122

=== All-Americans ===
For the year 1960, the NCAA recognizes six published All-American teams as "official" designations for purposes of its consensus determinations. The following chart identifies the NCAA-recognized consensus All-Americans and displays which first-team designations they received.

Name	Position	School	Number	Official	Other
Mike Ditka	End	Pittsburgh	6/6	AFCA, AP, FWAA, NEA, SN, UPI	CP, Time, WC
Dan LaRose	End	Missouri	6/6	AFCA, AP, FWAA, NEA, SN, UPI	CP, Time, WC
Bob Lilly	Tackle	TCU	6/6	AFCA, AP, FWAA, NEA, SN, UPI	CP, Time, WC
Tom Brown	Guard	Minnesota	6/6	AFCA, AP, FWAA, NEA, SN, UPI	CP, Time, WC
Joe Bellino	Halfback	Navy	6/6	AFCA, AP, FWAA, NEA, SN, UPI	CP, Time, WC
Bob Ferguson	Fullback	Ohio State	6/6	AFCA, AP, FWAA, NEA, SN, UPI	CP, Time, WC
Jake Gibbs	Quarterback	Ole Miss	6/6	AFCA, AP, FWAA, NEA, SN, UPI	CP, WC
Ken Rice	Tackle	Auburn	5/6	AFCA, AP, FWAA, SN, UPI	CP, Time, WC
E. J. Holub	Center	Texas Tech	5/6	AFCA, FWAA, NEA, SN, UPI	CP, Time, WC
Joe Romig	Guard	Colorado	3/6	AFCA, FWAA, UPI	WC
Ernie Davis	Halfback	Syracuse	2/6	AFCA, UPI	WC

=== Other awards ===
- Maxwell Award - Richie Lucas, Penn State
- Sammy Baugh Trophy - Dick Norman, Stanford
- Outland Trophy (best lineman) - Mike McGee, Duke
- AFCA Coach of the Year Award - Ben Schwartzwalder, Syracuse
- FWAA Coach of the Year Award - Ben Schwartzwalder, Syracuse

== Statistical leaders ==
=== Individual ===
==== Total offense ====
The following players were the individual leaders in total offense during the 1959 season:

Major college

Rank	Player	Team	Games	Plays	Total Yds	PtR
1	Dick Norman	Stanford	10	319	2018	68
2	Charley Johnson	New Mexico State	10	251	1635	114
3	Pete Hall	Marquette	10	330	1555	66
4	Jacky Lee	Cincinnati	10	298	1528	70
5	Norm Snead	Wake Forest	10	218	1365	78
6	Rich Mayo	Air Force	10	249	1357	58
7	Dwight Nichols	Iowa State	10	287	1355	102
8	Fran Curci	Miami (FL)	10	289	1328	50
9	Gale Weidner	Colorado	10	256	1305	84
10	Don Meredith	SMU	10	283	1291	82

Small college

Rank	Player	Team	Games	Plays	Total Yds
1	Gary Campbell	Whittier	10	309	2383
2	Jim St. Clair	UC Santa Barbara	10	245	1858
3	Jim Northrup	Alma	9	296	1658
4	Vince Tesone	Colorado Mines	10	291	1619
5	Green	Youngstown	10	230	1504
6	Miller	Austin	9	243	1485
7	Dale Mills	NE Missouri	9	250	1447
8	Alvaro	College of Idaho	10	227	1441
9	Ferguson	Graceland	8	264	1422
10	Kincaid	William Jewell	9	221	1368

==== Passing ====
The following players were the individual leaders in pass completions during the 1959 season:

Major college

Rank	Player	Team	Games	Compl.	Att.	Pct. Compl.	Yds.	Int.	TDs
1	Dick Norman	Stanford	10	152	263	.578	1963	12	11
2	Jacky Lee	Cincinnati	10	132	232	.569	1535	6	7
3	Pete Hall	Marquette	10	120	237	.506	1589	14	7
4	Rich Mayo	Air Force	10	110	211	.521	1212	10	6
5	Don Meredith	SMU	10	105	181	.580	1266	10	11
6	Joe Caldwell	Army	9	105	188	.559	1343	7	9
7	Charley Johnson	New Mexico State	10	105	199	.528	1449	8	18
8	Fran Curci	Miami (FL)	10	100	195	.513	1068	14	5
9	Gale Weidner	Colorado	10	100	207	.483	1200	13	7
10	Dick Soergel	Oklahoma State	10	93	155	.600	1102	4	8

Small college

Rank	Player	Team	Games	Compl.	Att.	Pct. Compl.	Yds.	Int.	TDs
1	Gary Campbell	Whittier	10	111	183	.607	1717	4	12
2	Light	Pacific	9	110	197	.558	1086	19	3
3	St. Clair	UC Santa Barbara	10	107	208	.514	1901	12	17
4	Stone	Akron	9	102	231	.442	1196	22	3
5	Terhes	Bucknell	9	97	173	.561	831	8	6
6	Coniam	Oberlin	8	96	165	.582	1111	8	10
7	Johnson	Pepperdine	8	96	187	.513	1197	13	11
8	Costello	Xavier (OH)	10	93	161	.578	1062	9	6
9	Flinn	Northern Illinois	9	93	174	.534	1420	12	18
10	Miller	Austin	9	90	154	.584	1219	14	13
10	Spurlock	Whitworth	9	90	167	.539	1309	9	18

==== Rushing ====
The following players were the individual leaders in rushing yards during the 1959 season:
Major college

Rank	Player	Team	Games	Yds	Rushes	Avg
1	Pervis Atkins	New Mexico State	10	971	130	7.47
2	Tom Watkins	Iowa State	10	843	158	5.34
3	Dwight Nichols	Iowa State	10	746	207	3.60
4	Dick Bass	Pacific	9	742	139	5.34
5	Billy Brown	New Mexico	10	740	95	7.79
6	Charlie Flowers	Ole Miss	10	733	141	5.20
7	Abner Haynes	North Texas State	10	730	116	6.29
8	Bob Crandall	New Mexico	10	729	116	6.28
9	Fred Doelling	Penn	9	707	133	5.32
10	Nolan Jones	Arizona State	11	689	143	4.82
11	Ernie Davis	Syracuse	10	686	98	7.00
12	Tom Moore	Vanderbilt	10	676	125	5.41
13	Keith Lincoln	Washington State	10	670	124	5.40
14	Jack Spikes	TCU	10	660	140	4.72
15	Monk Bailey	Utah	10	640	138	4.64
16	Don Perkins	New Mexico	10	635	146	4.35
17	Chet Boulris	Harvard	9	628	125	5.02
18	Charles Bowers	Hardin-Simmons	10	619	86	7.20
19	Paul Choquette	Brown	9	617	179	3.45
20	Alger Pugh	Virginia Tech	10	615	112	5.49

Small college

Rank	Player	Team	Games	Yds	Rushes	Avg
1	Dale Mills	NE Missouri	9	248	1385	5.58
2	Dallas Lee Garber	Marietta	9	188	1298	
3	Bill "Cannonball" Cooper	Muskingum	9	219	1191	
4	Brad Hustad	Luther	9	230	1188	
5	Hawk	Conway State	9	162	1156	
6	Steve McClellan	Wooster	9	198	1088	
7	Price	Bemidji State	8	117	1085	9.27
8	Larry Jacobson	Kearney State	10	155	1075	
9	Fowler	Martin Branch	8	151	1045	
10	MacDonald	Tufts	8	179	978	

==== Receiving ====
The following players were the individual leaders in receptions during the 1959 season:

Major college

Rank	Player	Team	Games	Receptions	Receiving Yards	Touchdowns
1	Chris Burford	Stanford	10	61	756	6
2	Bill Carpenter	Army	9	43	591	3
3	Dick Evans	VMI	10	35	698	9
4	Ben Robinson	Stanford	10	34	595	2
5	Bill Miller	Miami (FL)	10	33	395	1
6	Paul Maguire	The Citadel	10	32	549	10
7	Ed Kovac	Cincinnati	10	31	332	5
8	Bud Whitehead	Florida State	10	31	320	2
9	Norton	Iowa	9	30	428	4
10	Gregory	SMU	10	30	369	2

Small college

Rank	Player	Team	Games	Receptions	Receiving Yards	Touchdowns
1	Fred Tunnicliffe	UC Santa Barbara	10	48	1087	11
1	Hill	Cal Poly SLO	9	48	714	7
3	Hughes	Pacific University	9	46	543	0
4	Horn	Oberlin	8	44	578	5
5	Gregory	Whittier	10	42	751	7
6	House	Davidson	9	42	563	3
7	DeNeef	Hofstra	9	41	545	6
8	Ceremuga	Youngstown	10	39	615	8
9	Eachus	Bucknell	9	38	310	2
10	Foster	Humboldt State	10	37	469	4

==== Scoring ====
The following players were the individual leaders in scoring during the 1959 season:

Major college

Rank	Player	Team	Pts	TD	PAT	FG
1	Pervis Atkins	New Mexico State	107	17	5	0
2	Skip Face	Stanford	100	11	25	3
2	Nolan Jones	Arizona State	100	11	25	3
2	Gerhard Schwedes	Syracuse	100	16	4	0
5	Abner Haynes	North Texas State	90	14	6	0
5	Ed Kovac	Cincinnati	90	15	0	0
7	Larry Wilson	Utah	84	13	6	0
8	Bruce Maher	Detroit	74	11	8	0
8	Don Perkins	New Mexico	74	12	2	0
10	Bill Mathis	Clemson	70	11	4	0
11	Tony Banfield	Oklahoma State	66	11	0	0
12	Charlie Flowers	Ole Miss	66	11	0	0
13	Alger Pugh	Virginia Tech	66	11	0	0
14	Ernie Davis	Syracuse	64	10	4	0
15	Bobby Boyd	Oklahoma	62	10	2	0
16	Paul Maguire	The Citadel	60	10	0	0
16	Lavoie	South Carolina	60	12	0	
16	Moore	Vanderbilt	60	10	0	0
19	Gaiters	New Mexico State	58	9	4	0
19	Ravenel	Harvard	58	9	4	0

Small college

Rank	Player	Team	Pts	TD	PAT	FG
1	Garney Henley	Huron	141	22	9	0
2	Rusty Addleman	College of Emporia	138	16	39	1
3	Dale Mills	NE Missouri	124	19	10	0
4	Richard David Seastrunk	Newberry	120	20	0	0
5	Vernon Lee Farmer	Lenoir Rhyne	110	14	26	0
6	White	Capital	105	17	0	1
7	Childs	Florida A&M	102	15	12	0
8	Bill "Cannonball" Cooper	Muskingum	98	15	8	0
8	Garber	Marietta	98	15	8	0
10	Roger Waldrup	East Central Oklahoma	96	16	0	0
11	Phelps	Cornell (IA)	92	15	2	0
11	Schleicher	Pittsburg	92	13	14	0
13	Hawk	Conway State	91	15	1	0
14	Gary Campbell	Whittier	90	15	0	0
14	Chambers	Claflin	90	15	0	0
16	Branda	Wheaton	88	10	25	1
17	Stosuy	Southern Connecticut	87	12	15	-
18	McClellan	Wooster	86	13	8	0
18	Bass	East Carolina	86	14	2	0
18	Broadwater	West Carolina	86	13	8	0

=== Team ===
==== Total offense ====
The following teams were the leaders in total offense during the 1959 season:

Major college

Rank	Team	Games played	Total plays	Yards gained	Yards per game
1	Syracuse	10	738	4515	451.5
2	Iowa	9	632	3399	377.7
3	New Mexico State	10	618	3756	375.6
4	North Texas State	10	655	3713	371.3
5	Ole Miss	10	698	3686	368.6
6	Utah	10	712	3651	365.1
7	Wyoming	10	686	3577	357.7
8	New Mexico	10	639	3562	356.2
9	Stanford	10	665	3467	346.7
10	Oklahoma	10	731	3405	340.5

Small college

Rank	Team	Games played	Total plays	Yards gained	Yards per game
1	Whittier	10	654	4613	461.3
2	Florida A&M	9	511	3686	409.6
3	Huron	10	657	3975	397.5
4	Butler	9	643	3468	385.3
5	Winston-Salem	8	463	2993	374.1
6	Otterbein	9	560	3313	368.1
7	Marietta	9	561	3285	365.0
8	Bemidji State	8	461	2919	364.9
9	Lenoir Rhyne	9	507	3280	364.4
10	Hofstra	9	621	3278	364.2

==== Scoring offense ====
The following teams were the leaders in scoring offense during the 1959 season:

Major college

Rank	Team	Points per game
1	Syracuse	39.0
2	New Mexico State	33.2
3	Ole Miss	32.9
4	North Texas State	29.5
5	Wyoming	28.7
6	Clemson	26.2
7	New Mexico	26.0
8	Iowa	25.9
9	Penn State	25.5
10	Iowa State	24.8

==== Rushing offense ====
The following teams were the leaders in rushing offense during the 1959 season:

Major college

Rank	Team	Yards per game
1	Syracuse	313.6
2	North Texas State	290.8
3	New Mexico	289.8
4	Oklahoma	273.5
5	Utah	257.0
6	Wyoming	252.0
7	USC	249.3
8	Ole Miss	239.1
9	Iowa	239.0
10	Iowa State	228.7

Small college

Rank	Team	Yards per game
1	Bemidji State	326.6
2	Huron	309.1
3	Colorado State	308.8
4	Conway State	303.9
5	Florida A&M	292.4
6	Middle Tennessee	289.8
7	Johns Hopkins	282.3
8	Gustavus Adolphus	279.0
9	Muskingum	278.4
10	Delaware	276.6

==== Passing offense ====
The following teams were the leaders in passing offense during the 1959 season:

Major college

Rank	Team	Yards per game
1	Stanford	227.8
2	Marquette	187.0
3	San Jose State	185.2
4	Army	182.3
5	Boston College	175.3
6	Cincinnati	158.5
7	New Mexico State	157.3
8	Hardin-Simmons	154.2
9	Pacific	152.3
10	Wake Forest	149.8

Small college

Rank	Team	Yards per game
1	Whittier	199.3
2	UC Santa Barbara	199.0
3	Hofstra	189.2
4	Whitworth	180.0
5	Xavier (OH)	177.3
6	Wagner	172.6
7	Cal Poly	167.0
8	Oberlin	166.3
8	Otterbein	166.3
10	Graceland	160.6

==== Total defense ====
The following teams were the leaders in total defense during the 1959 season:

Major college

Rank	Team	Games played	Total plays	Yards gained	Yards per game
1	Syracuse	10	486	962	96.2
2	LSU	10	559	1432	143.2
3	Ole Miss	10	516	1472	147.2
4	Alabama	10	549	1799	179.9
5	Wyoming	10	572	1805	180.5
6	Auburn	10	565	1825	182.5
7	USC	10	603	1844	184.4
8	Illinois	9	533	1713	190.3
9	TCU	10	578	1945	194.5
10	North Texas State	10	553	1965	196.5

Small college

Rank	Team	Games played	Total plays	Yards gained	Yards per game
1	Maryland State	7	313	527	75.3
2	Trenton State	8	807	100.9	
2	Huron	10	595	1009	100.9
4	John Carroll	7	319	796	113.7
5	Norfolk State	8	382	948	118.5
6	Ithaca	7	340	848	121.1
7	Winston-Salem	8	337	1009	126.1
8	Livingstone	9	418	1136	126.2
9	Henderson State	448	1145	127.2	
10	Claflin	9	337	1171	130.1

==== Scoring defense ====
The following teams were the leaders in scoring defense during the 1959 season:

Major college

Rank	Team	Points per game
1	Ole Miss	2.1
2	LSU	2.9
3	Alabama	5.2
3	TCU	5.2
5	Auburn	5.8
6	Syracuse	5.9
7	Wyoming	6.2
8	Washington	6.5
9	Texas	7.3
10	North Texas	7.5

==== Rushing defense ====
The following teams were the leaders in rushing defense during the 1959 season:

Major college

Rank	Team	Yards per game
1	Syracuse	19.3
2	LSU	90.8
3	Ole Miss	93.9
4	USC	98.1
5	TCU	101.7
6	Clemson	108.5
7	Penn	109.8
7	Wyoming	109.8
9	South Carolina	111.5
10	Detroit	112.9

Small college

Rank	Team	Yards per game
1	Maryland State	36.3
2	Florida A&M	43.4
3	Trenton State	45.1
4	Winston-Salem	52.5
5	Whitewater State	57.8
6	John Carroll	57.9
7	Geneva	67.2
8	Cornell (IA)	68.1
9	West Chester	69.9
10	San Francisco State	69.9

==== Passing defense ====
The following teams were the leaders in passing defense during the 1959 season:

Major college

Rank	Team	Yards per game
1	Alabama	45.7
2	Montana	46.1
3	LSU	52.4
4	Ole Miss	53.3
5	Iowa State	55.3
6	North Texas State	58.1
7	Wake Forest	62.1
8	Kentucky	62.6
9	Auburn	63.6
10	Tennessee	66.8

Small college

Rank	Team	Yards per game
1	Huron	21.9
2	Henderson State	25.3
3	West Virginia State	35.6
4	Central (IA)	35.9
5	Ashland	36.0
6	St. Procopius	36.6
7	Martin Branch	36.8
8	Mankato State	37.4
9	Rochester	37.6
10	Maryland State	39.0
10	West Virginia Wesleyan	39.0

== See also ==
- 1959 College Football All-America Team
- 1959 Little All-America college football team
