= 1959 California Golden Bears football team =

American college football season

1959 California Golden Bears football
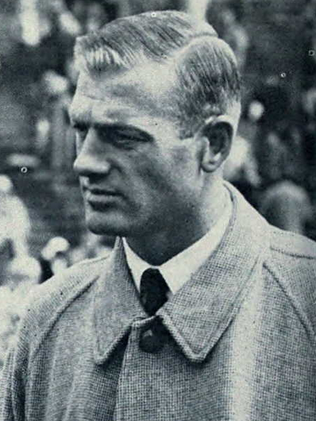
- Conference: Athletic Association of Western Universities
- Record: 2–8 (1–3 AAWU)
- Head coach: Pete Elliott (3rd season)
- Home stadium: California Memorial Stadium

1959 Athletic Association of Western Universities football standings
	Conf.					Overall
Team	W		L		T	W		L		T
No. 8 Washington ^ +	3	–	1	–	0	10	–	1	–	0
No. 14 USC +	3	–	1	–	0	8	–	2	–	0
UCLA +	3	–	1	–	0	5	–	4	–	1
California	1	–	3	–	0	2	–	8	–	0
Stanford	0	–	4	–	0	3	–	7	–	0
+ – Conference co-champions; ^ – Selected as Rose Bowl representative; Rankings from AP poll

The 1959 California Golden Bears football team was an American football team that represented the University of California, Berkeley in the Athletic Association of Western Universities (AAWU) during the 1959 college football season. In their third and final year under head coach Pete Elliott, the Golden Bears compiled a 2–8 record (1–3 in AAWU, fourth), and were outscored 223 to 115.

The team's statistical leaders included Wayne Crow with 379 passing yards, Walt Arnold with 351 rushing yards, and Gael Barsotti with 111 receiving yards. Two Cal players were selected by the Associated Press (AP) for the All-Coast team: Frank Sally as a first-team tackle and Walt Arnold as a second-team fullback. Wayne Crow later played four years in the American Football League.

== Schedule ==
Date	Time	Opponent	Site	Result	Attendance	Source
September 19	8:00 p.m.	at Washington State*	Memorial Stadium; Spokane, WA	W 20–6	24,850	
September 26		No. 13 Iowa*	California Memorial Stadium; Berkeley, CA	L 12–42	45,000	
October 3		at No. 10 Texas*	Memorial Stadium; Austin, TX	L 0–33	20,000	
October 10	1:15 p.m.	Notre Dame*	California Memorial Stadium; Berkeley, CA	L 6–28	68,500	
October 17		at UCLA	Los Angeles Memorial Coliseum; Los Angeles, CA (rivalry)	L 12–19	32,933	
October 24		Oregon State*	California Memorial Stadium; Berkeley, CA	L 20–24	41,000	
October 31		No. 6 USC	California Memorial Stadium; Berkeley, CA	L 7–14	37,000	
November 7		at No. 15 Oregon*	Multnomah Stadium; Portland, OR	L 18–20	20,852	
November 14		No. 13 Washington	California Memorial Stadium; Berkeley, CA	L 0–20	38,800	
November 21		at Stanford	Stanford Stadium; Stanford, CA (Big Game)	W 20–17	90,000	
*Non-conference game; Rankings from AP Poll released prior to the game; All times are in Pacific time; Source:

== Roster ==
1959 California Golden Bears football team roster
Players			Coaches
Offense: Pos. / # / Name / Class; QB / / Wayne Crow / Sr	Defense: Pos. / # / Name / Class	Special teams: Pos. / # / Name / Class	Head coach: Pete Elliot; Coordinators/assistant coaches Legend: (C) Team captain; (S) Suspended; (I) Ineligible; Injured; Redshirt
