= 1959 Stanford Indians football team =

American college football season

1959 Stanford Indians football
- Conference: Athletic Association of Western Universities
- Record: 3–7 (0–4 AAWU)
- Head coach: Jack Curtice (2nd season)
- Home stadium: Stanford Stadium

1959 Athletic Association of Western Universities football standings
	Conf.					Overall
Team	W		L		T	W		L		T
No. 8 Washington ^ +	3	–	1	–	0	10	–	1	–	0
No. 14 USC +	3	–	1	–	0	8	–	2	–	0
UCLA +	3	–	1	–	0	5	–	4	–	1
California	1	–	3	–	0	2	–	8	–	0
Stanford	0	–	4	–	0	3	–	7	–	0
+ – Conference co-champions; ^ – Selected as Rose Bowl representative; Rankings from AP poll

The 1959 Stanford Indians football team represented Stanford University in the 1959 college football season. The team was led by Jack Curtice in his second year. The team played their home games at Stanford Stadium in Stanford, California.

== Schedule ==
Date	Opponent	Site	Result	Attendance	Source
September 19	Oregon*	Stanford Stadium; Stanford, CA	L 27–28	25,000	
September 26	at No. 8 Wisconsin*	Camp Randall Stadium; Madison, WI	L 14–16	41,892	
October 3	Pacific (CA)*	Stanford Stadium; Stanford, CA	W 21–6	35,000	
October 10	at Washington	Husky Stadium; Seattle, WA	L 0–10	36,713	
October 17	Washington State*	Stanford Stadium; Stanford, CA	L 19–36	28,500	
October 24	at No. 5 USC	Los Angeles Memorial Coliseum; Los Angeles, CA (rivalry)	L 28–30	44,209	
October 31	San Jose State*	Stanford Stadium; Stanford, CA (rivalry)	W 54–38	37,500	
November 7	UCLA	Stanford Stadium; Stanford, CA	L 13–55	35,000	
November 14	at Oregon State*	Parker Stadium; Corvallis, OR	W 39–22	10,900	
November 21	California	Stanford Stadium; Stanford, CA (Big Game)	L 17–20	90,000	
*Non-conference game; Rankings from AP Poll released prior to the game; Source:

== Players drafted by the NFL ==
Player	Position	Round	Pick	NFL club
Dick Norman	Quarterback	5	57	Chicago Bears
Chris Burford	Split end	9	105	Cleveland Browns
Dean Hinshaw	Tackle	13	155	San Francisco 49ers
