= 1959 Air Force Falcons football team =

American college football season

1959 Air Force Falcons football
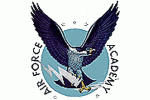
- Conference: Independent
- Record: 5–4–1
- Head coach: Ben Martin (2nd season)
- Captain: Howard Bronson
- Home stadium: DU Stadium

1959 Western major college football independents records
	Conf.			Overall
Team	W	L	T	W		L		T
Oregon		–		8	–	2	–	0
Washington State		–		6	–	4	–	0
Pacific (CA)		–		5	–	4	–	0
Air Force		–		5	–	4	–	1
San Jose State		–		4	–	6	–	0
Oregon State		–		3	–	7	–	0
Idaho		–		1	–	9	–	0

The 1959 Air Force Falcons football team represented the United States Air Force Academy as an independent during the 1959 college football season. Led by second-year head coach Ben Martin, the Falcons played their home games at DU Stadium in Denver and Folsom Field in Boulder, Colorado. They outscored their opponents 160–124 and finished the season with a record of 5–4–1.

This marked the first year that the Falcons faced Army, resulting in a respectable 13–13 tie before a crowd of 67,000 at Yankee Stadium in New York City on Halloween. The two academies traditionally met in odd-numbered years (except for 1961) until 1971 and have played annually in the competition (with Navy) for the Commander-in-Chief's Trophy, which was first awarded in 1972.

After the Army game, the Falcons held a record of 4–1–1, but they experienced a downturn in November, losing three out of four games.

== Schedule ==
Date	Opponent	Rank	Site	Result	Attendance	Source
September 26	at Wyoming		War Memorial Stadium; Laramie, WY	W 20–7	20,527	
October 3	at Trinity (TX)	No. 18	Alamo Stadium; San Antonio, TX	W 27–6	17,696	
October 10	Idaho	No. 18	DU Stadium; Denver, CO	W 21–0	17,393	
October 17	at Oregon	No. 17	Multnomah Stadium; Portland, OR	L 3–20	29,162	
October 23	at UCLA		Los Angeles Memorial Coliseum; Los Angeles, CA	W 20–7	32,935–32,979	
October 31	vs. Army		Yankee Stadium; Bronx, NY (rivalry)	T 13–13	67,000	
November 7	at Missouri	No. 18	Memorial Stadium; Columbia, MO	L 0–13	32,000	
November 14	Arizona		Folsom Field; Boulder, CO	W 22–15	8,500	
November 21	New Mexico		DU Stadium; Denver, CO	L 27–28	15,742	
November 28	at Colorado		Folsom Field; Boulder, CO	L 7–15	40,000	
Rankings from AP Poll released prior to the game
