= 1959 UCLA Bruins football team =

American college football season

1959 UCLA Bruins football

AAWU co-champion
- Conference: Athletic Association of Western Universities
- Record: 5–4–1 (3–1 AAWU)
- Head coach: Bill Barnes (2nd season)
- Captains: Rod Cochran; Ray Smith
- Home stadium: Los Angeles Memorial Coliseum

1959 Athletic Association of Western Universities football standings
	Conf.					Overall
Team	W		L		T	W		L		T
No. 8 Washington ^ +	3	–	1	–	0	10	–	1	–	0
No. 14 USC +	3	–	1	–	0	8	–	2	–	0
UCLA +	3	–	1	–	0	5	–	4	–	1
California	1	–	3	–	0	2	–	8	–	0
Stanford	0	–	4	–	0	3	–	7	–	0
+ – Conference co-champions; ^ – Selected as Rose Bowl representative; Rankings from AP poll

The 1959 UCLA Bruins football team was an American football team that represented the University of California, Los Angeles during the 1959 college football season. In their second year under head coach Bill Barnes, the Bruins compiled a 5–4–1 record (3–1 conference) and finished in a three-way tie for first place in the Athletic Association of Western Universities.

UCLA's offensive leaders in 1959 were quarterback Billy Kilmer with 702 passing yards each, Ray Smith with 417 rushing yards, and Marv Luster with 366 receiving yards.

== Schedule ==
Date	Opponent	Rank	Site	Result	Attendance	Source
September 18	No. 11 Purdue*		Los Angeles Memorial Coliseum; Los Angeles, CA	T 0–0	38,582–38,675	
October 3	at Pittsburgh*		Pitt Stadium; Pittsburgh, PA	L 21–25	30,683	
October 17	California		Los Angeles Memorial Coliseum; Los Angeles, CA (rivalry)	W 19–12	32,933–33,006	
October 23	Air Force*		Los Angeles Memorial Coliseum; Los Angeles, CA	L 7–20	32,935–32,979	
October 31	No. 17 Washington		Los Angeles Memorial Coliseum; Los Angeles, CA	L 7–23	32,838–32,943	
November 7	at Stanford		Stanford Stadium; Stanford, CA	W 55–13	35,000	
November 13	NC State*		Los Angeles Memorial Coliseum; Los Angeles, CA	W 21–12	21,112–21,149	
November 21	at No. 4 USC		Los Angeles Memorial Coliseum; Los Angeles, CA (Victory Bell)	W 10–3	85,917–85,951	
November 28	Utah*	No. 20	Los Angeles Memorial Coliseum; Los Angeles, CA	W 21–6	19,528–19,600	
December 5	No. 1 Syracuse*	No. 17	Los Angeles Memorial Coliseum; Los Angeles, CA	L 8–36	46,436–46,557	
*Non-conference game; Rankings from AP Poll released prior to the game

== Personnel ==
=== Players ===
- Glen Almquist, end
- Foster Anderson, sophomore tackle
- Harry Baldwin, junior center
- Steve Bauwens, sophomore tackle
- Dean Betts, junior tackle
- Craig Chudy, junior end
- Rod Cochran, senior guard and co-captain
- Dave Dabov, junior guard
- Gene Gaines, junior halfback
- Chuck Hicks, sophomore tackle
- Ron Hull, sophomore center
- Jim Johnson, junior halfback
- Ivory Jones, junior quarterback
- Billy Kilmer, junior tailback
- Tony Longo, junior tackle
- Marv Luster, junior end
- Frank Macari, sophomore guard
- Jack Metcalf, junior guard
- Trusse Norris, senior end
- Paul Oglesby, senior tackle
- Tom Paton, sophomore guard
- Art Phillips, senior quarterback
- John Pierovich, senior end
- Joe Rosenkrans, sophomore halfback
- Marshall Shirk, sophomore guard
- Bob Smith, sophomore halfback
- Earl Smith, junior end
- Skip Smith, senior tailback
- Ray Smith, senior fullback
- Bob Stevens, sophomore fullback
- Al Story, senior tailback
- Don Vena, sophomore end
- Jim Wallace, senior tackle
- Duane Wills, sophomore center
- Fred Zingler, sophomore fullback

=== Coaches ===
- Head coach - Bill Barnes
- Assistant coaches - Dan Peterson, John Hermann, Deke Bracket (senior assistant), John Johnson, Sam Boghosian, Jim Dawson, Bob Bergdahl

=== Other personnel ===
- Trainer - Ducky Drake
- Assistant trainers - Don Vick, Larry Carter
- Team physician -Dr. Martin Blazina
