= 1959 Washington Huskies football team =

American college football season

1959 Washington Huskies football

AAWU co-champion Rose Bowl champion

Rose Bowl, W 44–8 vs. Wisconsin
- Conference: Athletic Association of Western Universities

Ranking
- Coaches: No. 7
- AP: No. 8
- Record: 10–1 (3–1 AAWU)
- Head coach: Jim Owens (3rd season)
- Captain: Game captains
- Home stadium: University of Washington Stadium

1959 Athletic Association of Western Universities football standings
	Conf.					Overall
Team	W		L		T	W		L		T
No. 8 Washington ^ +	3	–	1	–	0	10	–	1	–	0
No. 14 USC +	3	–	1	–	0	8	–	2	–	0
UCLA +	3	–	1	–	0	5	–	4	–	1
California	1	–	3	–	0	2	–	8	–	0
Stanford	0	–	4	–	0	3	–	7	–	0
+ – Conference co-champions; ^ – Selected as Rose Bowl representative; Rankings from AP poll

The 1959 Washington Huskies football team represented the University of Washington during the 1959 college football season. Home games were played on campus in Seattle at Husky Stadium known at the time as University of Washington Stadium.

In its third season under head coach Jim Owens, Washington was 9–1 in the regular season and 3–1 in the Athletic Association of Western Universities, one of three co-champions of the five-team AAWU (Big Five) in its inaugural year. The Pacific Coast Conference (PCC) had disbanded in the spring, and the AAWU consisted of the four teams from state of California and the Huskies. The other four PCC teams from the north (Oregon, Oregon State, Washington State, and Idaho) were independent for several years. (Washington defeated all four this season.) The Cougars joined the league in 1962 and the Oregon schools in 1964; it was later renamed the Pacific-8 Conference.

Led on the field by junior All-American quarterback Bob Schloredt, the Huskies started the season unranked and gained the Rose Bowl berth. Eighth-ranked, they were a 6½-point underdog to the #6 Wisconsin Badgers (7–2), the champions of the Big Ten. On New Year's Day in Pasadena, Washington jumped out to a 17–0 lead in the first quarter and won in a 44–8 rout to finish the season at 10–1. The Rose Bowl victory was the first for a West Coast team in seven years, and only the second since the end of World War II; the loser both times was Wisconsin.

Washington outscored its opponents 253 to 73, and outside the sole loss to USC, they allowed no more than twelve points in each of their other ten games, with four shutouts. The final rankings in this era were released in early December, at the end of the regular season and prior to the bowl games.

== Schedule ==
Date	Opponent	Rank	Site	Result	Attendance	Source
September 19	at Colorado*		Folsom Field; Boulder, CO	W 21–12	27,000	
September 26	Idaho*		University of Washington Stadium; Seattle, WA	W 23–0	24,476	
October 3	Utah*		University of Washington Stadium; Seattle, WA	W 51–6	27,560	
October 10	Stanford		University of Washington Stadium; Seattle, WA	W 10–0	36,713	
October 17	No. 7 USC	No. 18	University of Washington Stadium; Seattle, WA	L 15–22	54,497	
October 24	at No. 11 Oregon*		Multnomah Stadium; Portland, OR (rivalry)	W 13–12	37,000	
October 31	at UCLA	No. 17	Los Angeles Memorial Coliseum; Los Angeles, CA	W 23–7	32,838–32,943	
November 7	Oregon State*	No. 12	University of Washington Stadium; Seattle, WA	W 13–6	45,317	
November 14	at California	No. 13	California Memorial Stadium; Berkeley, CA	W 20–0	38,800	
November 21	Washington State*	No. 14	University of Washington Stadium; Seattle, WA (rivalry)	W 20–0	55,782	
January 1, 1960	vs. No. 6 Wisconsin*	No. 8	Rose Bowl; Pasadena, CA (Rose Bowl)	W 44–8	100,809	
*Non-conference game; Rankings from AP Poll released prior to the game

== Coaching staff ==
- Bert Clark
- Tom Tipps

== Professional football draft selections ==
No University of Washington Huskies were selected in the 1960 NFL draft, which lasted 2- rounds with 240 selections. or in the inaugural 1960 AFL draft, which lasted 33 rounds with 264 selections.
