= 1959 Oregon State Beavers football team =

American college football season

1959 Oregon State Beavers football
- Conference: Independent
- Record: 3–7
- Head coach: Tommy Prothro (5th season)
- Home stadium: Parker Stadium; Multnomah Stadium

1959 Western major college football independents records
	Conf.			Overall
Team	W	L	T	W		L		T
Oregon		–		8	–	2	–	0
Washington State		–		6	–	4	–	0
Pacific (CA)		–		5	–	4	–	0
Air Force		–		5	–	4	–	1
San Jose State		–		4	–	6	–	0
Oregon State		–		3	–	7	–	0
Idaho		–		1	–	9	–	0

The 1959 Oregon State Beavers football team represented Oregon State College as an independent during the 1959 college football season. In their fifth season under head coach Tommy Prothro, the Beavers compiled a 3–7 record and were outscored 178 to 166. Oregon State played three home games on campus at Parker Stadium in Corvallis and one at Multnomah Stadium in Portland.

Earlier in the year, the Pacific Coast Conference (PCC) disbanded; this was the first of five years that Oregon State and Oregon competed as independents.

== Schedule ==
Date	Opponent	Site	Result	Attendance	Source
September 19	USC	Multnomah Stadium; Portland, OR	L 6–27	23,895	
September 26	at Texas Tech	Jones Stadium; Lubbock, TX	L 14–15	20,000	
October 3	at Nebraska	Memorial Stadium; Lincoln, NE	L 6–7	28,000	
October 10	at Michigan	Michigan Stadium; Ann Arbor, MI	L 7–18	74,693	
October 17	Idaho	Parker Stadium; Corvallis, OR	W 66–18	10,628	
October 24	at California	California Memorial Stadium; Berkeley, CA	W 24–20	41,000	
October 31	Washington State	Parker Stadium; Corvallis, OR	L 0–14	17,601	
November 7	at No. 12 Washington	Husky Stadium; Seattle, WA	L 6–13	45,317	
November 14	Stanford	Parker Stadium; Corvallis, OR	L 22–39	10,900	
November 21	at No. 15 Oregon	Hayward Field; Eugene, OR (Civil War)	W 15–7	22,500	
Rankings from AP Poll released prior to the game; Source:
