= 1959 San Jose State Spartans football team =

American college football season

1959 San Jose State Spartans football
- Conference: Independent
- Record: 4–6
- Head coach: Bob Titchenal (3rd season)
- Home stadium: Spartan Stadium

1959 Western major college football independents records
	Conf.			Overall
Team	W	L	T	W		L		T
Oregon		–		8	–	2	–	0
Washington State		–		6	–	4	–	0
Pacific (CA)		–		5	–	4	–	0
Air Force		–		5	–	4	–	1
San Jose State		–		4	–	6	–	0
Oregon State		–		3	–	7	–	0
Idaho		–		1	–	9	–	0

The 1959 San Jose State Spartans football team represented San Jose State College—now known as San Jose State University—as an independent during the 1959 college football season. Led by third-year head coach Bob Titchenal, the Spartans compiled a record of 4–6 and were outscored by opponents 278 to 192. The team played home games at Spartan Stadium in San Jose, California.

== Schedule ==
Date	Opponent	Site	Result	Attendance	Source
September 18	at Denver	DU Stadium; Denver, CO	W 14–13	15,995–16,000	
September 26	Washington State	Spartan Stadium; San Jose, CA	L 6–30	15,500	
October 3	Hawaii	Spartan Stadium; San Jose, CA (rivalry)	W 44–14	10,000	
October 9	Oregon	Spartan Stadium; San Jose, CA	L 12–35	15,500	
October 17	at Fresno State	Ratcliffe Stadium; Fresno, CA (rivalry)	W 40–14	10,907	
October 24	Arizona State	Spartan Stadium; San Jose, CA	W 24–15	14,000	
October 31	at Stanford	Stanford Stadium; Stanford, CA (rivalry)	L 38–54	37,500	
November 7	Wyoming	Spartan Stadium; San Jose, CA	L 7–28	17,000	
November 14	at Iowa State	Clyde Williams Field; Ames, IA	L 0–55	6,059–7,500	
November 20	at Pacific (CA)	Pacific Memorial Stadium; Stockton, CA (Victory Bell)	L 7–20	14,000	

== Team players in the NFL ==
The following San Jose State players were selected in the 1960 NFL draft.

Player	Position	Round	Overall	NFL team
Ray Norton	Halfback	4	46	San Francisco 49ers
