= Henry Wallace (American football) =

American football player (born 1938)

No. 45
- Position: Defensive back

Personal information
- Born: September 26, 1938 (age 88); Bakersfield, California, U.S.
- Listed height: 6 ft 0 in (1.83 m)
- Listed weight: 195 lb (88 kg)

Career information
- High school: Long Beach Polytechnic
- College: Pacific

Career history
- Los Angeles Chargers (1960)
- Stats at Pro Football Reference

Henry Marshall Wallace (born September 26, 1938) is an American former professional football player who was a defensive back with the Los Angeles Chargers of the American Football League (AFL). He played college football for the Pacific Tigers.
