= 1959 Oregon Ducks football team =

American college football season

1959 Oregon Ducks football
- Conference: Independent
- Record: 8–2
- Head coach: Len Casanova (9th season)
- Captains: Willie West; Tom Keele; Bob Peterson
- Home stadium: Hayward Field, Multnomah Stadium

1959 Western major college football independents records
	Conf.			Overall
Team	W	L	T	W		L		T
Oregon		–		8	–	2	–	0
Washington State		–		6	–	4	–	0
Pacific (CA)		–		5	–	4	–	0
Air Force		–		5	–	4	–	1
San Jose State		–		4	–	6	–	0
Oregon State		–		3	–	7	–	0
Idaho		–		1	–	9	–	0

The 1959 Oregon Ducks football team represented the University of Oregon during the 1959 college football season. Following the disbandment of the Pacific Coast Conference (PCC) in the spring of 1959, Oregon was an independent for the next five seasons, before joining the PCC's successor, the Athletic Association of Western Universities (AAWU) in 1964. In their ninth season under head coach Len Casanova, the Ducks compiled an 8–2 record and outscored their opponents, 209 to 113. The team divided its home schedule between Hayward Field in Eugene and Multnomah Stadium in Portland.

The team's statistical leaders included Dave Grosz with 865 passing yards, Dave Powell with 495 rushing yards, and Greg Altenhofen with 240 receiving yards.

== Schedule ==
Date	Time	Opponent	Rank	Site	Result	Attendance	Source
September 19		at Stanford		Stanford Stadium; Stanford, CA	W 28–27	25,000	
September 26		Utah		Hayward Field; Eugene, OR	W 21–6	15,200	
October 3	1:30 p.m.	Washington State		Hayward Field; Eugene, OR	W 14–6	16,800	
October 9		at San Jose State		Spartan Stadium; San Jose, CA	W 35–12	15,500	
October 17		No. 17 Air Force		Multnomah Stadium; Portland, OR	W 20–3	29,162	
October 24		Washington	No. 11	Multnomah Stadium; Portland, OR (rivalry)	L 12–13	37,000	
October 31		at Idaho	No. 16	Neale Stadium; Moscow, ID	W 45–7	7,000	
November 7		California	No. 15	Multnomah Stadium; Portland, OR	W 20–18	20,852	
November 14		at Washington State	No. 14	Rogers Field; Pullman, WA	W 7–6	15,500	
November 21		Oregon State	No. 15	Hayward Field; Eugene, OR (Civil War)	L 7–15	22,500	
Rankings from AP Poll released prior to the game; All times are in Pacific time; Source:
