= Rusty Addleman =

American football player (1938–2021)

Profile
- Position: Fullback

Personal information
- Born: November 12, 1938; Oberlin, Kansas, U.S.
- Died: July 12, 2021 (aged 82); Oberlin, Kansas, U.S.
- Listed height: 6 ft 1 in (1.85 m)
- Listed weight: 210 lb (95 kg)

Career information
- High school: Decatur Community High School
- College: College of Emporia (1956–1959)

George Russell Addleman (November 12, 1938 – July 12, 2021) was an American college football fullback for the College of Emporia Fighting Presbies from 1956 to 1959. As a senior in 1959, he rushed for 931 yards (103.4 yards per game) on 165 carries and ranked second among all college football players with 138 points scored (16 touchdowns, 39 points after touchdown, and one field goal). He was also named to the 1959 NAIA all-star team. He also closed his career as the second highest ground gainer (3,729 yards) and scorer (39 touchdowns, 82 extra points) in College of Emporia history. He signed with the Green Bay Packers in 1960 but was released before the regular season began. He served in the United States Air Force from 1963 to 1972. He later returned to his hometown of Oberlin, Kansas, where he was the third generation in his family to operate the Addleman Drug Store. He died in 2021.
