= 1959 Idaho Vandals football team =

American college football team

1959 Idaho Vandals football
- Conference: Independent
- Record: 1–9
- Head coach: Skip Stahley (6th season)
- Home stadium: Neale Stadium

1959 Western major college football independents records
	Conf.			Overall
Team	W	L	T	W		L		T
Oregon		–		8	–	2	–	0
Washington State		–		6	–	4	–	0
Pacific (CA)		–		5	–	4	–	0
Air Force		–		5	–	4	–	1
San Jose State		–		4	–	6	–	0
Oregon State		–		3	–	7	–	0
Idaho		–		1	–	9	–	0

The 1959 Idaho Vandals football team represented the University of Idaho in the 1959 college football season. Led by sixth-year head coach Skip Stahley, the Vandals were an independent in the NCAA's University Division and had a 1–9 record. Two home games were played on campus at Neale Stadium in Moscow, with one in Boise at old Bronco Stadium at Boise Junior College.

The Pacific Coast Conference disbanded in the spring, and Idaho was an independent in football for the next six seasons. They played ten games for the first time; the first six were on the road, and two games were played at night (at Arizona and Pacific).

The Vandals suffered a fifth straight loss in the Battle of the Palouse with neighbor Washington State; Idaho led at halftime, but fell 5–27 at Rogers Field in Pullman. In the rivalry game with Montana at Neale Stadium, the Vandals narrowly retained the Little Brown Stein in the finale to avoid going winless.

After this season, Stahley took on the dual role of athletic director in July 1960.

== Schedule ==
Date	Time	Opponent	Site	Result	Attendance	Source
September 19	12:30 p.m.	at Utah State	old Romney Stadium; Logan, UT	L 0–14	3,200	
September 26	2:00 p.m.	at Washington	Husky Stadium; Seattle, WA	L 0–23	24,476	
October 3	7:00 p.m.	at Arizona	Arizona Stadium; Tucson, AZ	L 14–16	19,500	
October 10	12:30 p.m.	at Air Force	DU Stadium; Denver, CO	L 0–21	17,393	
October 17	1:30 p.m.	at Oregon State	Parker Stadium; Corvallis, OR	L 18–66	10,628	
October 24	2:00 p.m.	at Washington State	Rogers Field; Pullman, WA (Battle of the Palouse)	L 5–27	19,200	
October 31	1:30 p.m.	Oregon^{†}	Neale Stadium; Moscow ID	L 7–45	7,000	
November 7	12:30 p.m.	vs. Utah	old Bronco Stadium; Boise, ID	L 13–47	8,500	
November 14	8:00 p.m.	at Pacific (CA)	Pacific Memorial Stadium; Stockton, CA	L 13–28	8,000	
November 21	1:00 p.m.	Montana	Neale Stadium; Moscow, ID (Little Brown Stein)	W 9–6	4,000	
^{†}Homecoming; All times are in Pacific time

== Coaching staff ==
- Don Swartz, line
- Ed Knecht, backs
- J. V. Johnson, ends
- Wayne D. Anderson, freshmen

== All-Coast ==
No Vandals made the All-Coast team or the second team. Honorable mention were end Jim Norton and tackle Jim Prestel; both went on to lengthy pro careers.

== NFL draft ==
Two seniors from the 1959 Vandals were selected in the 1960 NFL draft:

Player	Position	Round	Overall	Franchise
Jim Norton	WR	7th	75	Detroit Lions
Stan Fanning	T	11th	128	Chicago Bears

One fifth-year senior was previously selected in the 1959 NFL draft:

Player	Position	Round	Overall	Franchise
Jim Prestel	T	6th	70	Cleveland Browns
