= 1959 Washington State Cougars football team =

American college football season

1959 Washington State Cougars football
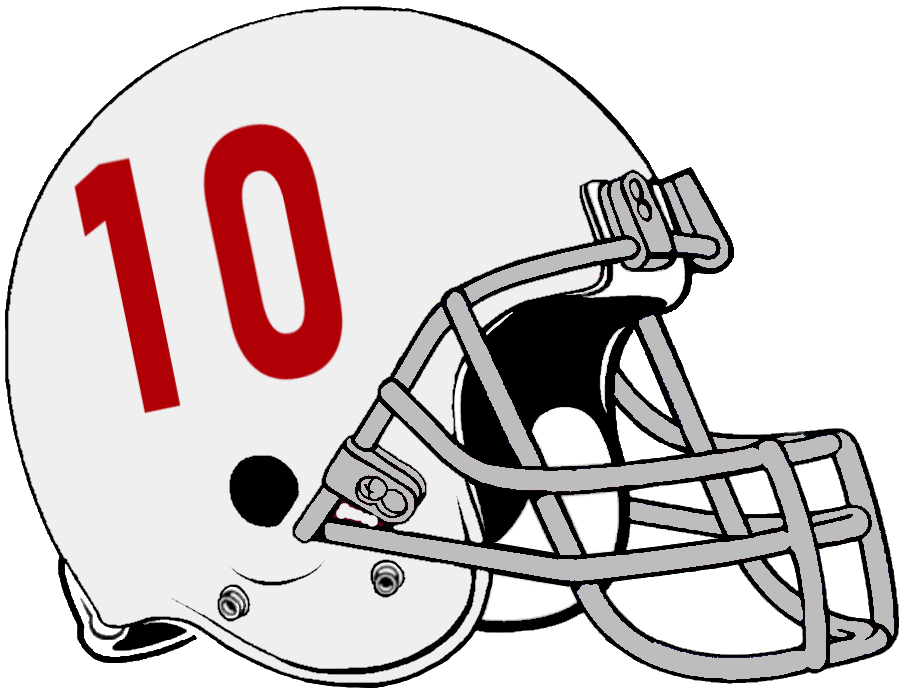
- Conference: Independent
- Record: 6–4
- Head coach: Jim Sutherland (4th season)
- Home stadium: Rogers Field; Memorial Stadium (Spokane)

1959 Western major college football independents records
	Conf.			Overall
Team	W	L	T	W		L		T
Oregon		–		8	–	2	–	0
Washington State		–		6	–	4	–	0
Pacific (CA)		–		5	–	4	–	0
Air Force		–		5	–	4	–	1
San Jose State		–		4	–	6	–	0
Oregon State		–		3	–	7	–	0
Idaho		–		1	–	9	–	0

The 1959 Washington State Cougars football team was an American football team that represented Washington State University as an independent during the 1959 college football season. In their fourth season under head coach Jim Sutherland, the Cougars compiled a 6–4 record and outscored their opponents 177 to 121.

The team's statistical leaders included Mel Melin with 526 passing yards, Keith Lincoln with 670 rushing yards, and Gail Cogdill with 531 receiving yards. The Cougars had only three home games this season: the season opener in Spokane (at night) and two on campus in Pullman.

This was the first season after the disbandment of the Pacific Coast Conference, and the first as "Washington State University." After three years as an independent, WSU became the sixth member of the AAWU in 1962.

== Schedule ==
Date	Time	Opponent	Site	Result	Attendance	Source
September 19	8:00 p.m.	California	Memorial Stadium; Spokane, WA	L 6–20	24,850	
September 26		at San Jose State	Spartan Stadium; San Jose, CA	W 30–6	15,500	
October 3	1:30 p.m.	at Oregon	Hayward Field; Eugene, OR	L 6–14	16,800	
October 10		at Pacific (CA)	Pacific Memorial Stadium; Stockton, CA	W 20–12	15,500	
October 17		at Stanford	Stanford Stadium; Stanford, CA	W 36–19	28,500	
October 24	2:00 p.m.	Idaho	Rogers Field; Pullman, WA (Battle of the Palouse)	W 27–5	19,200	
October 31		at Oregon State	Parker Stadium; Corvallis, OR	W 14–0	17,601	
November 14	1:30 p.m.	No. 14 Oregon^{†}	Rogers Field; Pullman, WA	L 6–7	15,500	
November 21		at No. 14 Washington	Husky Stadium; Seattle, WA (rivalry)	L 0–20	56,000	
November 26		at Houston	Houston Stadium; Houston, TX	W 32–18	6,000	
^{†}Homecoming; Rankings from AP Poll released prior to the game; All times are in Pacific time; Source:

== NFL draft ==
Two Cougars were selected in the 1960 NFL draft, which was 20 rounds and 240 selections.

Player	Position	Round	Overall	Franchise
Gail Cogdill	End	6	63	Detroit Lions
Don Ellersick	Back	6	66	Los Angeles Rams
