= Dale Mills =

American football player

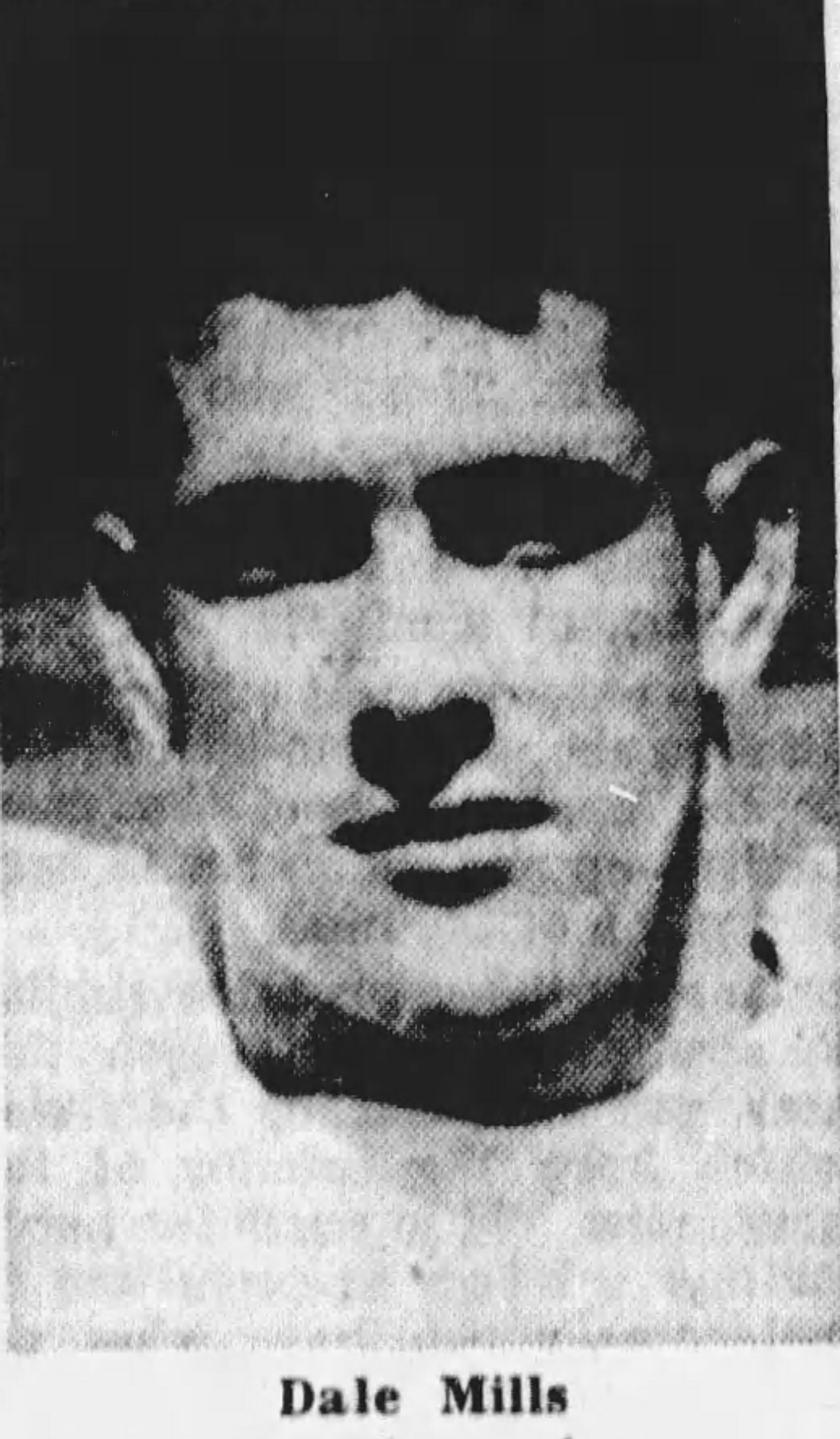
- Dale Mills, 1960

Profile
- Position: Halfback

Career information
- College: NE Missouri State (1957–1960)

Dale "Paley" Mills is an American former football halfback for Northeast Missouri from 1957 to 1960.

In 1958, he led all college players with 1,358 rushing yards on 186 carries for an average of 7.30 yards per carry. He also ranked third in scoring with 122 points on 20 touchdowns and two points after touchdown.

In 1959, he led college football in rushing yards for the second consecutive year, tallying 1,385 yards on 248 carries (5.58 yard average). He again ranked third with 124 points scored (19 touchdowns, 10 points after touchdown).

In 1960, he rushed for 1,358 yards and concluded his college career with 4,502 rushing yards and over 400 points scored. He was also selected as a first-team player on the 1960 Little All-America college football team.

After his playing career ended, Mills worked as a teacher and coach, including one year at Breckenridge, six years at Hamilton, and multiple years at Buffalo. He was inducted into the Truman Bulldogs Hall of Fame in 1984.
