= 1960 Rose Bowl =

American college football game

- 46th Rose Bowl Game
Washington Huskies	Wisconsin Badgers
(9–1)	(7–2)
AAWU	Big Ten
44	8
Head coach: Jim Owens	Head coach: Milt Bruhn
AP / Coaches; 8 / 7	AP / Coaches; 6 / 6
	1	2	3	4	Total
Washington	17	7	7	13	44
Wisconsin	0	8	0	0	8
- Date: January 1, 1960
- Season: 1959
- Stadium: Rose Bowl
- Location: Pasadena, California
- Players of the Game: Bob Schloredt (QB Washington); George Fleming (HB Washington)
- Favorite: Wisconsin by 6 1/2 points
- Referee: Don Hamilton (Big Ten; split crew: Big Ten, AAWU)
- Attendance: 100,809

United States TV coverage
- Network: NBC
- Nielsen ratings: 29.9

The 1960 Rose Bowl was the 46th edition of the college football bowl game, played at the Rose Bowl in Pasadena, California, on Friday, January 1, 1960, at the end of the 1959 season. This was the first Rose Bowl appearance by the Huskies since 1944 and the first appearance by the Badgers since 1953. This was the first time these two football programs met on the field. The Washington Huskies defeated the Wisconsin Badgers, 44–8.

The face value of a game ticket was six dollars.

== Teams ==
=== Washington Huskies ===
The Washington Huskies were the first conference champions of the newly-formed Athletic Association of Western Universities (AAWU), commonly referred to as the "Big Five" at the time (and now as the Pac-12). The conference formed in the wake of the "pay for play" scandal and collapse of the Pacific Coast Conference (PCC) after the 1958 season. As a result of the demise of the PCC, the Rose Bowl had no contractual agreement with either the Big Five or Big Ten to send their champions to the game: both teams received "at-large" invitations and accepted.

Washington, USC, and UCLA all finished with 3–1 conference records. Washington had defeated UCLA, which had defeated USC, which had defeated Washington. The USC loss was the only one for Washington, and the Huskies had the best record in the AAWU. Washington entered the game as the West representative, the first champions of the newly-formed AAWU conference. They were led by quarterback Bob Schloredt, a 20-year-old junior who "conspicuously lacked his trade's traditional egotism," stating "I consider myself just adequate." Remarkably, he was also 90% blind in his left eye.

=== Wisconsin Badgers ===
Wisconsin, the Big Ten Conference champion, had a 7–2 regular season record, with losses to Purdue and Illinois. Despite the similarity in the poll rankings, Wisconsin entered the game as a 6½-point favorite, due in part to recent dominance of the Big Ten in recent Rose Bowl games, winning twelve of thirteen.

== Scoring summary ==
1st Quarter

- WASH – Don McKeta 6-yard run (George Fleming kick)
- WASH – Fleming 36-yard field goal
- WASH – Fleming 53-yard punt return (Fleming kick)

2nd Quarter

- WISC – Tom Wiesner 4-yard run (Allan Schoonover pass from Dale Hackbart)
- WASH – Lee Folkins 23-yard pass from Bob Schloredt (Fleming kick)

3rd Quarter

- WASH – Ray Jackson 2-yard run (Fleming kick)

4th Quarter

- WASH – Schloredt 3-yard run (Fleming kick)
- WASH – Don Millich 3-yard pass from Bob Hivner (pass failed)

== Game notes ==
- Vice President Richard Nixon served as the tournament's grand marshal.

== Aftermath ==
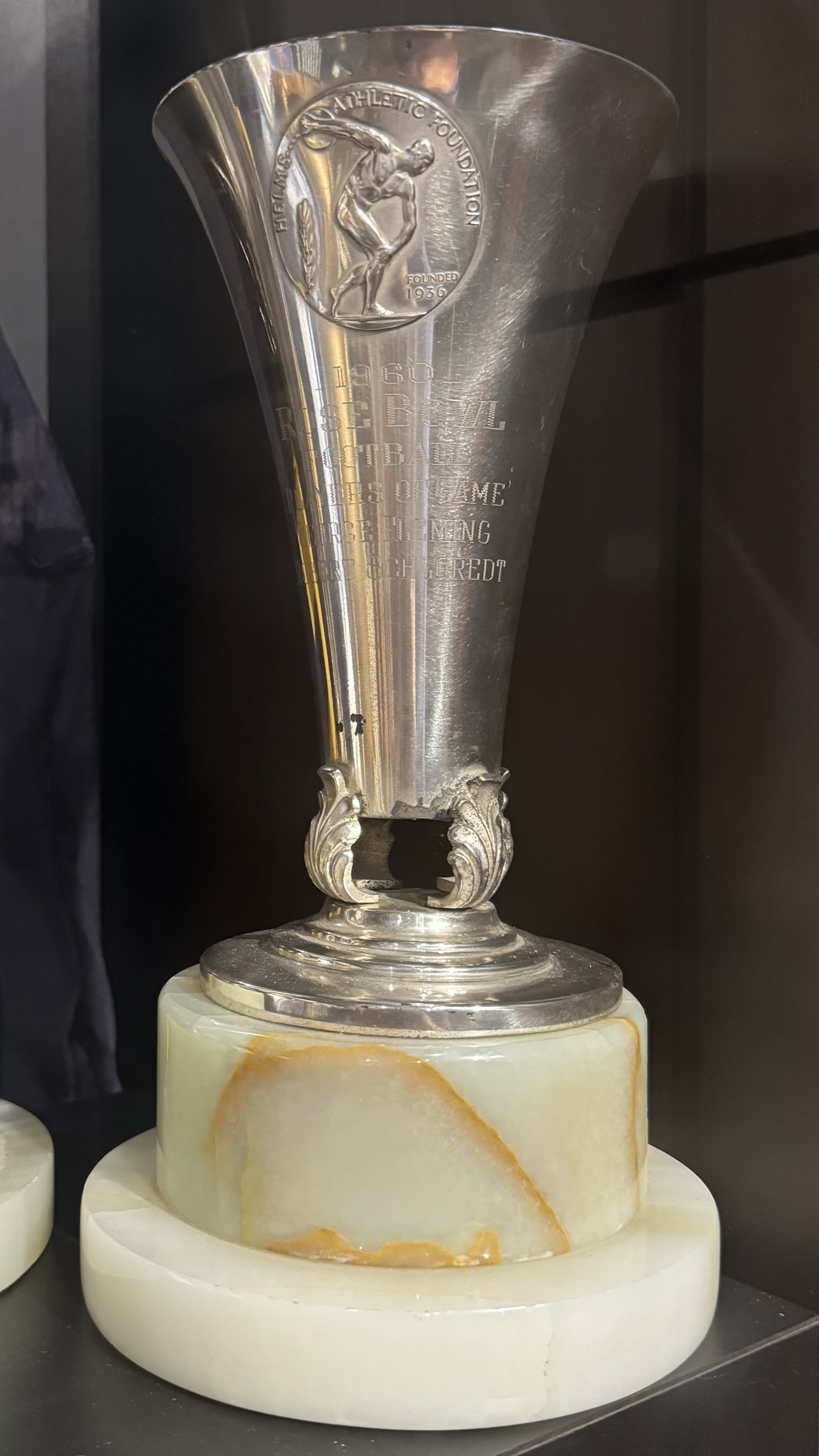
Players of the Game trophy awarded by the Helms Athletic Foundation

Washington quarterback Bob Schloredt and halfback George Fleming were named co-Players of the Game. Schloredt was subsequently named the Player of the Game the following year, the first in the history of the Rose Bowl to be twice-honored. In 1970, Fleming became the first African-American to be elected to the Washington state senate.
