= Bob Schloredt =

American gridiron football player (1939–2019)

Biographical details
- Born: October 2, 1939; Deadwood, South Dakota, U.S.
- Died: May 16, 2019 (aged 79); Enumclaw, Washington, U.S.

Playing career
- 1958–1960: Washington
- 1961–1962: BC Lions
- Position: Quarterback

Coaching career (HC unless noted)
- 1963–1973: Washington (assistant)
- 1975: The Hawaiians (assistant)

Accomplishments and honors

Awards
- First-team All-American (1959); Voit Trophy (1959); First-team All-PCC (1959)
- College Football Hall of Fame; Inducted in 1989 (profile)

Robert Schloredt (October 2, 1939 – May 16, 2019) was an American football quarterback in the NCAA Division I and CFL and coaching in both the NCAA and World Football League (WFL).

== Early life ==
Schloredt was born in Deadwood, South Dakota in 1939 and attended Gresham High School in suburban Portland. He was blinded in his left eye from a fireworks injury suffered at the age of five.

== College career ==
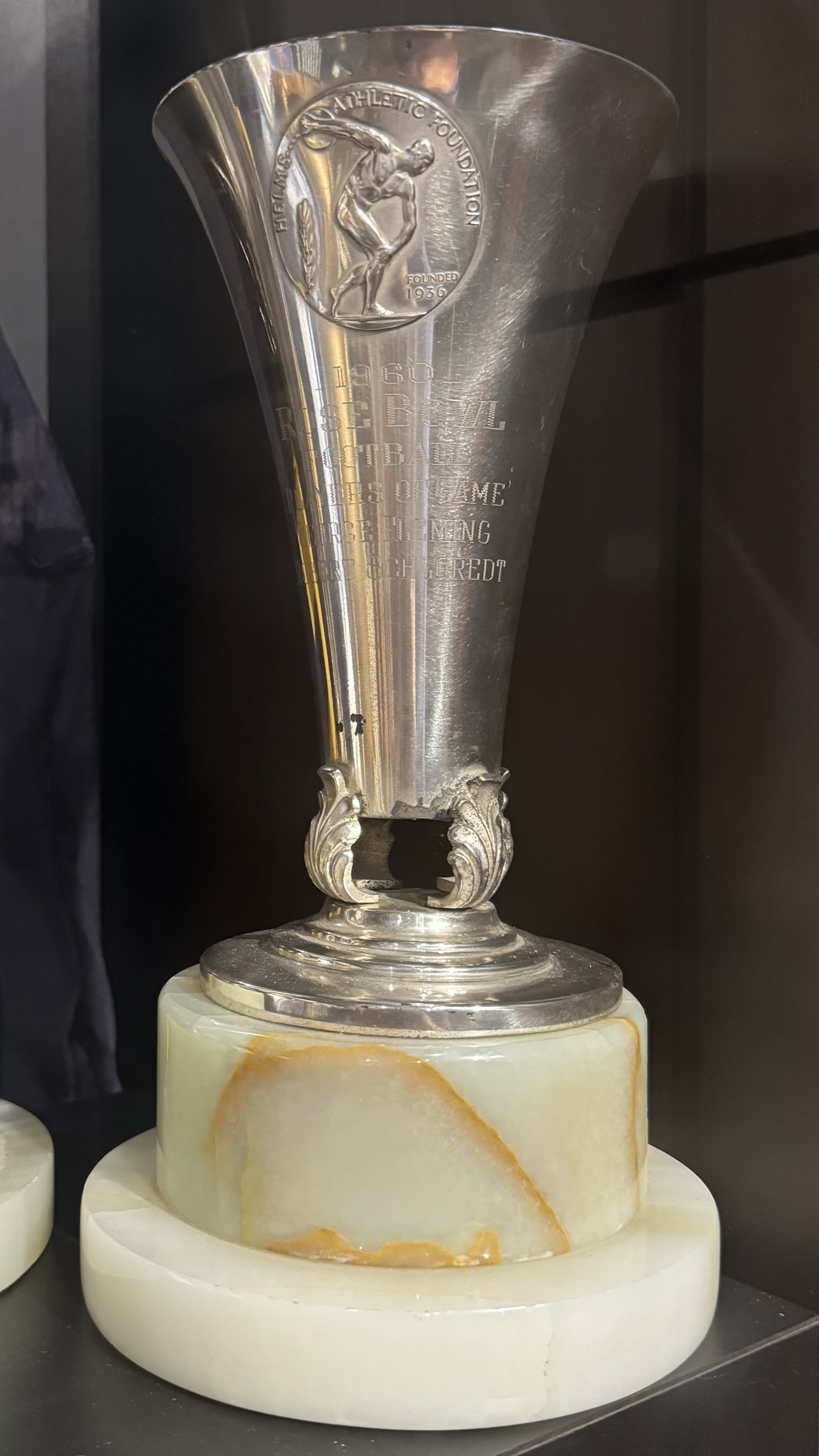
1960 Rose Bowl Player of the Game trophy, presented by the Helms Athletic Foundation

Schloredt played quarterback and defensive back for the Washington Huskies from 1958 to 1960. In 1959, Schloredt earned Associated Press first-team All-America honors as a quarterback while also leading the Huskies with six interceptions that season. In 1960, he became the first University of Washington football player to appear on the cover of Sports Illustrated.

Schloredt ran the option and was 15-2 as a starter, leading the team to victories in both the 1960 Rose Bowl and 1961 Rose Bowl games. He was named Player of the Game for both Rose Bowl games becoming the first two-time Rose Bowl MVP.

== Professional career ==
Schloredt was drafted in the 1961 CFL draft by the British Columbia Lions and in the 1961 American Football League draft by the Dallas Texans. Schloredt played for the Lions for two seasons.

== Coaching career ==
Following his CFL career, Schloredt was assistant coach for the Washington Huskies for eleven years. He joined The Hawaiians of the WFL which later folded mid-season.

== Awards ==
Schloredt was awarded the 1959 W. J. Voit Memorial Trophy as the outstanding football player on the Pacific Coast. He named the Most Valuable Player of the 1960 and 1961 Rose Bowl games. He was the first two-time recipient, later joined by Charles White, Ron Dayne, and Vince Young.

He was inducted into the College Football Hall of Fame in 1989 and the Rose Bowl Hall of Fame in 1991.

== Death ==
Schloredt's family announced his death on May 16, 2019.

== See also ==
- Washington Huskies football statistical leaders
