= 1958 UNAM Pumas football team =

1958 Pumas UNAM football
- Conference: Independent
- Record: 4–5
- Head coach: Roberto "Tapatío" Méndez (13th season)
- Offensive scheme: T formation
- Captain: Fernando Carpinteyro

The 1958 Pumas UNAM football team represented the National Autonomous University of Mexico (UNAM) during the 1958 college football season. In their 13th year under head coach Roberto "Tapatío" Méndez, the Pumas compiled a 4–5 record. It was the fifth time in program history that the team beat multiple American opponents in one season.

Key players included halfbacks Víctor "El Rápido" Vélez and Luis Rodríguez, quarterbacks Eduardo Taber and Alfonso Fernández, fullback Fernando de la Garza, guard and captain Fernando Carpinteyro, tackles Eduardo Castillo and Armando Machorro, centers Jorge Pena and José Armendariz, and ends Robert Vasquez and Ismael Encinas.

Their rivals, IPN, broke up into two squads in 1958 (Poli Blanco and Poli Guinda), but UNAM refused to follow suit. (Note: The team eventually broke up into three teams in 1970.) As a result, the Pumas were not official members of the Liga Mayor and played most of its 1958 schedule against American teams.

== Schedule ==
Date	Opponent	Site	Result	Attendance	Source
September 13	at Los Angeles State	East Los Angeles College Stadium; Monterey Park, CA	L 6–23	11,500	
September 20	San Diego	Balboa Stadium; San Diego, CA	L 6–20	6,500	
September 26	at New Mexico A&M	Memorial Stadium; Las Cruces, NM	L 14–28		
October 4	Academia Militarizada México	Estadio Olímpico Universitario; Mexico City	W 56–0		
October 25	Sul Ross State	Estadio Olímpico Universitario; Mexico City	W 12–6	35,000	
November 1	Cal Poly Pomona	Estadio Olímpico Universitario; Mexico City	L 14–29		
November 6	IPN	Estadio Olímpico Universitario; Mexico City (Clásico Poli-Universidad)	W 6–0	40,000	
November 15	Pensacola NAS	Estadio Olímpico Universitario; Mexico City	W 18–14		
November 22	at Texas A&I	Estadio Olímpico Universitario; Mexico City	L 0–27	20,000	
