= 1958 UC Riverside Highlanders football team =

American college football season

1958 UC Riverside Highlanders football
- Conference: Independent
- Record: 2–3–2
- Head coach: Carl Selin (3rd season)
- Home stadium: UCR Athletic Field

1958 Western non-major college football independents records
	Conf.			Overall
Team	W	L	T	W		L		T
No. 6 Montana State		–		8	–	1	–	0
Cal Poly Pomona		–		7	–	3	–	0
UC Riverside		–		2	–	3	–	2
Hawaii		–		5	–	7	–	0
Pepperdine		–		1	–	7	–	0
Rankings from UPI small college poll

The 1958 UC Riverside Highlanders football team represented the University of California, Riverside as an independent during the 1958 college football season. Led by Carl Selin in his third and final season as head coach, UC Riverside compiled a record of 2–3–2. The team was outscored by its opponents 112 to 92 for the season. The Highlanders played home games at UCR Athletic Field in Riverside, California.

Selin finished his tenure at UC Riverside with an overall record of 4–13–3, for a .275 winning percentage.

== Schedule ==
Date	Opponent	Site	Result	Source
September 27	at Chino Institute for Men	Chino, CA	L 14–22	
October 4	Pomona freshmen	UCR Athletic Field; Riverside, CA	T 6–6	
October 11	at Cal Western	Point Loma High School field; San Diego, CA	W 29–18	
October 18	Claremont-Mudd	UCR Athletic Field; Riverside, CA	L 0–22	
October 25	Caltech	UCR Athletic Field; Riverside, CA	L 7–26	
November 8	at Cal Aggies JV	Davis, CA	T 12–12	
November 15	Long Beach State freshmen	UCR Athletic Field; Riverside, CA	W 24–6	

(Note: cfbdatawarehouse.com incorrectly lists two additional 1958 games, against Antelope Valley College and Cerritos College. These were played by Riverside Junior College, not UC Riverside, and are therefore not included here.)
