= 1959 San Diego State Aztecs football team =

American college football season

1959 San Diego State Aztecs football
- Conference: California Collegiate Athletic Association
- Record: 1–6–1 (0–5 CCAA)
- Head coach: Paul Governali (4th season)
- Home stadium: Aztec Bowl

1959 California Collegiate Athletic Association football standings
	Conf.					Overall
Team	W		L		T	W		L		T
Fresno State $	5	–	0	–	0	7	–	3	–	0
Los Angeles State	3	–	2	–	0	7	–	3	–	0
Cal Poly	3	–	2	–	0	6	–	3	–	0
UC Santa Barbara	2	–	3	–	0	6	–	4	–	0
Long Beach State	2	–	3	–	0	4	–	5	–	0
San Diego State	0	–	5	–	0	1	–	6	–	1
$ – Conference champion

The 1959 San Diego State Aztecs football team represented San Diego State College (Note: San Diego State University was known as San Diego State College from 1935 to 1971.) during the 1959 college football season.

San Diego State competed in the California Collegiate Athletic Association (CCAA). The team was led by head coach Paul Governali, in his fourth year, and played home games at Aztec Bowl. They finished the season with one win, six losses and one tie (1–6–1, 0–5–0 CCAA). The Aztecs scored only 74 points in their eight games while giving up 208.

== Schedule ==
Date	Opponent	Site	Result	Attendance	Source
September 26	at Los Angeles State	Rose Bowl; Pasadena, CA	L 3–21		
October 3	Cal Poly	Aztec Bowl; San Diego, CA	L 6–13	8,500	
October 10	Long Beach State	Aztec Bowl; San Diego, CA	L 6–14	7,500	
October 17	at Redlands*	Redlands Stadium (Note: This stadium is the predecessor to the current Ted Runner Stadium on the University of Redlands campus, which was opened for the 1968 season); Redlands, CA	W 19–15		
October 31	at Fresno State	Ratcliffe Stadium; Fresno, CA (rivalry)	L 13–38	5,500	
November 7	UC Santa Barbara^{†}	Aztec Bowl; San Diego, CA	L 7–29	5,500–6,500	
November 14	at Pepperdine*	Sentinel Field; Inglewood, CA	T 14–14	1,500	
November 21	San Diego Marines (Note: The Marine Corps Recruit Depot (MCRD) in San Diego fielded a team that played against colleges and other military teams from 1922 to 1964.)*	Aztec Bowl; San Diego, CA	L 6–64	8,500	
*Non-conference game; ^{†}Homecoming

== Team players in the NFL/AFL ==
No San Diego State players were selected in the 1960 NFL draft or 1960 AFL Draft.

The following finished their San Diego State career in 1959, were not drafted, but played in the NFL/AFL.

Player	Position	First NFL Team
Bob Keyes	Halfback	1960 Oakland Raiders
