= 1959 Los Angeles State Diablos football team =

American college football season

1959 Los Angeles State Diablos football
- Conference: California Collegiate Athletic Association
- Record: 7–3 (3–2 CCAA)
- Head coach: Leonard Adams (9th season)
- Home stadium: Rose Bowl; East Los Angeles College Stadium

1959 California Collegiate Athletic Association football standings
	Conf.					Overall
Team	W		L		T	W		L		T
Fresno State $	5	–	0	–	0	7	–	3	–	0
Los Angeles State	3	–	2	–	0	7	–	3	–	0
Cal Poly	3	–	2	–	0	6	–	3	–	0
UC Santa Barbara	2	–	3	–	0	6	–	4	–	0
Long Beach State	2	–	3	–	0	4	–	5	–	0
San Diego State	0	–	5	–	0	1	–	6	–	1
$ – Conference champion

The 1959 Los Angeles State Diablos football team represented Los Angeles State College—now known as California State University, Los Angeles—as a member of the California Collegiate Athletic Association (CCAA) during the 1959 college football season. Led by ninth-year head coach Leonard Adams, Los Angeles State compiled an overall record of 7–3 with a mark of 3–2 in conference play, tying for second place in the CCAA. The Diablos played three home games at the Rose Bowl in Pasadena, California and one home game at East Los Angeles College Stadium in Monterey Park, California.

== Schedule ==
Date	Opponent	Site	Result	Attendance	Source
September 11	Mexico Poly*	East Los Angeles College Stadium; Monterey Park, CA	W 25–8	11,000	
September 19	at Sacramento State*	Charles C. Hughes Stadium; Sacramento, CA	W 60–12		
September 26	San Diego State	Rose Bowl; Pasadena, CA	W 21–3		
October 3	Pepperdine*	Rose Bowl; Pasadena, CA ("Old Shoe" rivalry)	W 48–14		
October 9	at UC Santa Barbara	La Playa Stadium; Santa Barbara, CA	W 19–0	8,200	
October 24	at Long Beach State	Veterans Stadium; Long Beach, CA	L 7–12	4,800	
October 31	at University of Mexico*	Estadio Olímpico Universitario; Mexico City, Mexico	W 40–22	20,000	
November 7	Cal Poly^{†}	Rose Bowl; Pasadena, CA	W 29–28	4,000	
November 13	at Hawaii*	Honolulu Stadium; Honolulu, HI	L 6–27	7,000	
November 21	at Fresno State	Ratcliffe Stadium; Fresno, CA	L 0–21	8,000–12,440	
*Non-conference game; ^{†}Homecoming

== Team players in the NFL ==
The following Los Angeles State players were selected in the 1960 NFL draft.

Player	Position	Round	Overall	NFL team
Dave Ross	End, fullback	12	135	Detroit Lions
Joe Womack	Halfback	13	150	Pittsburgh Steelers
