= 1959 UC Riverside Highlanders football team =

American college football season

1959 UC Riverside Highlanders football
- Conference: Independent
- Record: 5–2
- Head coach: Jim Whitley (1st season)
- Home stadium: UCR Athletic Field

1959 Western non-major college football independents records
	Conf.			Overall
Team	W	L	T	W		L		T
Cal Poly Pomona		–		7	–	1	–	1
Santa Clara		–		4	–	1	–	0
UC Riverside		–		5	–	2	–	0
Montana State		–		6	–	3	–	0
Hawaii		–		3	–	6	–	0
Pepperdine		–		2	–	5	–	1

The 1959 UC Riverside Highlanders football team represented the University of California, Riverside as an independent during the 1959 college football season. Led by first-year head coach Jim Whitley, UC Riverside compiled a record of 5–2. The team outscored its opponents 125 to 75 for the season. The Highlanders played home games at UCR Athletic Field in Riverside, California.

== Schedule ==
Date	Opponent	Site	Result
September 26	Azusa (Note: Azusa College existed from 1956 to 1964. It merged with Los Angeles Pacific College in 1965 to become Azusa Pacific University. Azusa Pacific's official football records do not include the history from either of the predecessor schools.)	UCR Athletic Field; Riverside, CA	W 18–8
October 3	at Caltech	Rose Bowl; Pasadena, CA	W 19–0
October 10	Cal Western^{†}	UCR Athletic Field; Riverside, CA	W 33–0
October 17	UC Santa Barbara JV	UCR Athletic Field; Riverside, CA	L 8–19
October 24	at Claremont-Mudd	Fritz B. Burns Stadium; Claremont, CA	W 14–8
October 31	La Verne	UCR Athletic Field; Riverside, CA	W 6–0
November 7	New Mexico Western	UCR Athletic Field; Riverside, CA	L 27–40
^{†}Homecoming

(Note: cfbdatawarehouse.com incorrectly lists an additional 1959 game, against Antelope Valley College. This was played by Riverside Junior College, not UC Riverside, and is therefore not included here.)
