= 1958 UC Santa Barbara Gauchos football team =

American college football season

1958 UC Santa Barbara Gauchos football
- Conference: California Collegiate Athletic Association
- Record: 4–4–1 (3–2 CCAA)
- Head coach: Ed Cody (3rd season)
- Home stadium: La Playa Stadium

1958 California Collegiate Athletic Association football standings
	Conf.					Overall
Team	W		L		T	W		L		T
No. 15 Cal Poly +	4	–	1	–	0	9	–	1	–	0
Fresno State +	4	–	1	–	0	5	–	5	–	0
UC Santa Barbara	3	–	2	–	0	4	–	4	–	1
San Diego State	2	–	3	–	0	3	–	5	–	0
Long Beach State	1	–	3	–	1	2	–	6	–	1
Los Angeles State	0	–	4	–	1	4	–	4	–	1
+ – Conference co-champions; Rankings from UPI small college poll

The 1958 UC Santa Barbara Gauchos football team represented University of California, Santa Barbara (UCSB) as a member of the California Collegiate Athletic Association (CCAA) during the 1958 college football season. Led by third-year head coach Ed Cody, the Gauchos compiled an overall record of 4–4–1 with a mark of 3–2 in conference play, placing third in the CCAA. UC Santa Barbara played home games at La Playa Stadium in Santa Barbara, California.

== Schedule ==
Date	Time	Opponent	Site	Result	Attendance	Source
September 20		San Diego State	La Playa Stadium; Santa Barbara, CA	W 25–0	5,000–7,300	
September 27		at Whittier*	Hadley Field; Whittier, CA	L 6–7	5,000	
October 4		Fresno State	La Playa Stadium; Santa Barbara, CA	W 25–22	7,000–7,500	
October 11		at Los Angeles State	Rose Bowl; Pasadena, CA	W 20–6	1,000–1,450	
October 18		at Long Beach State*	Veterans Stadium; Long Beach, CA	L 7–12	3,500	
October 25		San Francisco State*	La Playa Stadium; Santa Barbara, CA	W 20–14	9,500	
November 1		at Occidental*	D.W. Patterson Field; Los Angeles, CA	T 6–6	3,200	
November 8		vs. Cal Aggies (Note: The game against the Cal Aggies was part of an "All-UC Doubleheader" that was held annually from 1948 to 1963. The other game of the double-header was California vs. UCLA. The games were always held at the home stadium of either Cal or UCLA.)*	California Memorial Stadium; Berkeley, CA	L 8–14	50,050	
November 21	8:15 p.m.	Cal Poly	La Playa Stadium; Santa Barbara, CA	L 12–40	8,600–9,000	
*Non-conference game
