= 1959 Cal Poly Mustangs football team =

American college football season

1959 Cal Poly Mustangs football
- Conference: California Collegiate Athletic Association
- Record: 6–3 (3–2 CCAA)
- Head coach: LeRoy Hughes (10th season)
- Home stadium: Mustang Stadium

1959 California Collegiate Athletic Association football standings
	Conf.					Overall
Team	W		L		T	W		L		T
Fresno State $	5	–	0	–	0	7	–	3	–	0
Los Angeles State	3	–	2	–	0	7	–	3	–	0
Cal Poly	3	–	2	–	0	6	–	3	–	0
UC Santa Barbara	2	–	3	–	0	6	–	4	–	0
Long Beach State	2	–	3	–	0	4	–	5	–	0
San Diego State	0	–	5	–	0	1	–	6	–	1
$ – Conference champion

The 1959 Cal Poly Mustangs football team represented California Polytechnic State College—now known as California Polytechnic State University, San Luis Obispo—as a member of the California Collegiate Athletic Association (CCAA) during the 1959 college football season. Led by tenth-year head coach LeRoy Hughes, Cal Poly compiled an overall record of 6–3 with a mark of 3–2 in conference play, tying for second place in the CCAA. The Mustangs played home games at Mustang Stadium in San Luis Obispo, California.

== Schedule ==
Date	Opponent	Rank	Site	Result	Attendance	Source
September 19	San Diego*		Mustang Stadium; San Luis Obispo, CA	W 36–14		
September 26	at No. 13 Montana State*	No. 12	Gatton Field; Bozeman, MT	L 18–35		
October 3	at San Diego State		Aztec Bowl; San Diego, CA	W 13–6	8,500	
October 10	Eastern New Mexico*		Mustang Stadium; San Luis Obispo, CA	W 55–0		
October 17	Long Beach State		Mustang Stadium; San Luis Obispo, CA	W 6–3		
October 24	Fresno State		Mustang Stadium; San Luis Obispo, CA	L 13–28	8,000	
November 7	at Los Angeles State		Rose Bowl; Pasadena, CA	L 28–29	4,000	
November 14	Lewis & Clark*		Mustang Stadium; San Luis Obispo, CA	W 20–10		
November 20	UC Santa Barbara		Mustang Stadium; San Luis Obispo, CA	W 48–20	5,500	
*Non-conference game; Rankings from UPI Poll released prior to the game
