= Paul Governali =

American football player and coach (1921–1978)

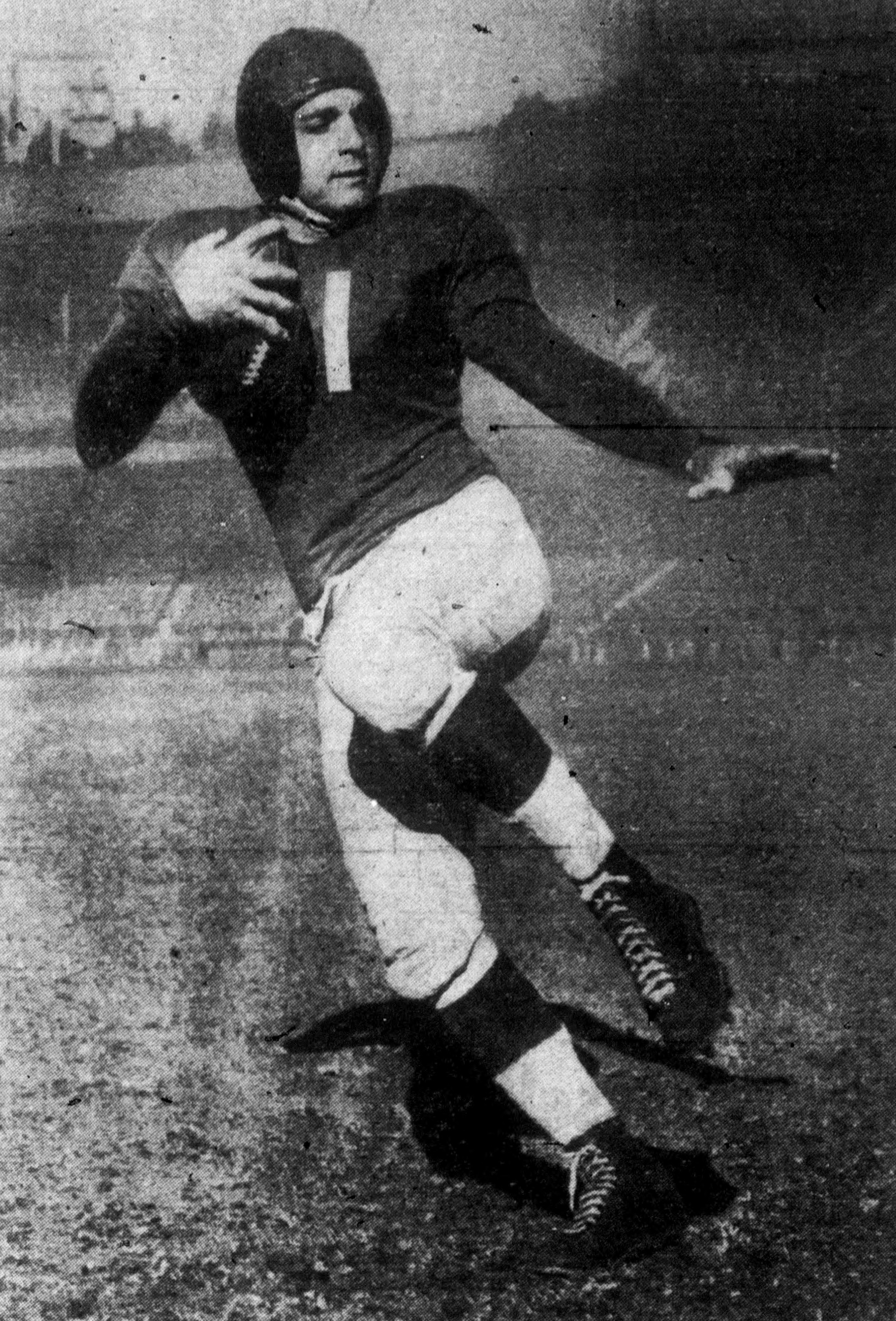
- Governali, c. 1947

No. 4, 41
- Positions: Quarterback, tailback

Personal information
- Born: January 5, 1921; The Bronx, New York, U.S.
- Died: February 14, 1978 (aged 57); San Diego, California, U.S.
- Listed height: 5 ft 11 in (1.80 m)
- Listed weight: 194 lb (88 kg)

Career information
- High school: Evander Childs (Bronx)
- College: Columbia (1940–1942)
- NFL draft: 1943: 1st round, 4th overall pick

Career history

Playing
- Boston Yanks (1946–1947); New York Giants (1947-1948)

Coaching
- Columbia (1950–1955) Backfield coach; San Diego State (1956–1960) Head coach

Awards and highlights
- Maxwell Award (1942); Consensus All-American (1942); NCAA passing yards leader (1942); First-team All-Eastern (1942); Second-team All-Eastern (1941)

Career NFL statistics
- Passing attempts: 500
- Passing completions: 218
- Completion percentage: 43.6%
- TD–INT: 31–33
- Passing yards: 3,348
- Passer rating: 59.5
- Stats at Pro Football Reference

Head coaching record
- Career: 11–27–4 (.310)
- College Football Hall of Fame

Paul Vincent Governali (January 5, 1921 – February 14, 1978), nicknamed "Pitchin' Paul", was an American professional football player and coach. He played college football for the Columbia Lions.

== College career ==
Governali played as a halfback for the Columbia Lions. He was a consensus All-American in 1942, won the Maxwell Award and was runner-up to Frank Sinkwich for the Heisman Trophy. Governali passed for 1,442 yards in nine games that season, threw for 19 touchdowns, and completed 52% of his passes, all new collegiate records. He was also among the leading punters in the nation. He still holds the Columbia Lions record for touchdown passes in one game, with five. He was inducted into the College Football Hall of Fame in 1986.

== Professional career ==
Upon graduating in 1943, he passed up offers from both professional baseball and football teams to enlist in the United States Marine Corps, where he served for three years. After the war, he played in the National Football League (NFL) from 1946 to 1948 with the Boston Yanks and the New York Giants.

== After football ==
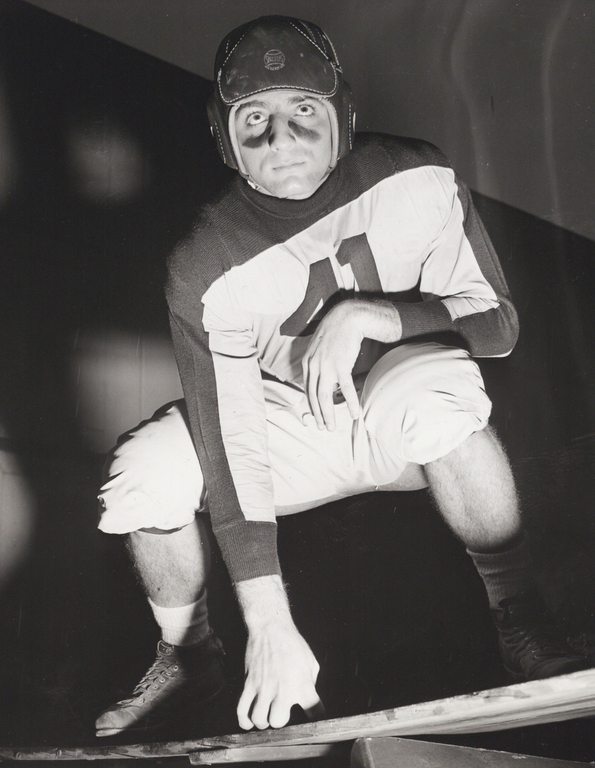
Governali, 1941

Governali retired from playing following the 1948 season and returned to Columbia, where he worked as an assistant coach while pursuing his doctorate in education, which he received in 1951.

== Head coaching career ==
He served as the head football coach at San Diego State University from 1956 to 1960, compiling a record of 11–27–4. He was succeeded as head coach of the San Diego State Aztecs by Don Coryell.

== Head coaching record ==
Year	Team	Overall	Conference	Standing	Bowl/playoffs
San Diego State Aztecs (California Collegiate Athletic Association) (1956–1960)
1956	San Diego State	4–3–2	2–1	T–2nd	
1957	San Diego State	2–7	0–1	5th	
1958	San Diego State	3–5	2–3	4th	
1959	San Diego State	1–6–1	0–5	6th	
1960	San Diego State	1–6–1	0–5	6th	
San Diego State:		11–27–4	4–15		
Total:		11–27–4			

== Personal life ==
Governali also had a minor stint as an actor, portraying a professional football player in the 1948 film titled, Triple Threat.

He and his wife, Edna, had four children: Paul, Jeannie, Nicole, and Sam.

== Death ==
Governali died on February 14, 1978, at Kaiser Hospital, in San Diego, following a long illness.

== See also ==
- List of NCAA major college football yearly passing leaders
