= 1958 San Diego State Aztecs football team =

American college football season

1958 San Diego State Aztecs football
- Conference: California Collegiate Athletic Association
- Record: 3–5 (2–3 CCAA)
- Head coach: Paul Governali (3rd season)
- Home stadium: Aztec Bowl

1958 California Collegiate Athletic Association football standings
	Conf.					Overall
Team	W		L		T	W		L		T
No. 15 Cal Poly +	4	–	1	–	0	9	–	1	–	0
Fresno State +	4	–	1	–	0	5	–	5	–	0
UC Santa Barbara	3	–	2	–	0	4	–	4	–	1
San Diego State	2	–	3	–	0	3	–	5	–	0
Long Beach State	1	–	3	–	1	2	–	6	–	1
Los Angeles State	0	–	4	–	1	4	–	4	–	1
+ – Conference co-champions; Rankings from UPI small college poll

The 1958 San Diego State Aztecs football team represented San Diego State College (Note: San Diego State University was known as San Diego State College from 1935 to 1971.) during the 1958 college football season.

San Diego State competed in the California Collegiate Athletic Association (CCAA). The team was led by head coach Paul Governali, in his third year, and played home games at Aztec Bowl. They finished the season with three wins and five losses (3–5, 2–3 CCAA). The Aztecs scored only 84 points in their eight games while giving up 200.

== Schedule ==
Date	Opponent	Site	Result	Attendance	Source
September 20	at UC Santa Barbara	La Playa Stadium; Santa Barbara, CA	L 0–25	5,000–7,300	
September 27	Pepperdine*	Aztec Bowl; San Diego, CA	W 6–0	8,200	
October 3	at Long Beach State	Veterans Stadium; Long Beach, CA	W 20–12	3,000	
October 18	Los Angeles State	Aztec Bowl; San Diego, CA	W 7–0	9,000	
November 1	Fresno State^{†}	Aztec Bowl; San Diego, CA (rivalry)	L 20–22	9,800	
November 8	San Diego Marines (Note: The Marine Corps Recruit Depot (MCRD) in San Diego fielded a team that played against colleges and other military teams from 1922 to 1964.)*	Aztec Bowl; San Diego, CA	L 0–25	11,000	
November 15	at Cal Poly	Alex G. Spanos Stadium; San Luis Obispo, CA	L 14–48	2,000	
November 22	Pacific (CA)*	Aztec Bowl; San Diego, CA	L 17–68	11,000	
*Non-conference game; ^{†}Homecoming
