= 1959 Long Beach State 49ers football team =

American college football season

1959 Long Beach State 49ers football
- Conference: California Collegiate Athletic Association
- Record: 4–5 (2–3 CCAA)
- Head coach: Don Reed (2nd season)
- Home stadium: Veterans Memorial Stadium

1959 California Collegiate Athletic Association football standings
	Conf.					Overall
Team	W		L		T	W		L		T
Fresno State $	5	–	0	–	0	7	–	3	–	0
Los Angeles State	3	–	2	–	0	7	–	3	–	0
Cal Poly	3	–	2	–	0	6	–	3	–	0
UC Santa Barbara	2	–	3	–	0	6	–	4	–	0
Long Beach State	2	–	3	–	0	4	–	5	–	0
San Diego State	0	–	5	–	0	1	–	6	–	1
$ – Conference champion

The 1959 Long Beach State 49ers football team represented Long Beach State College—now known as California State University, Long Beach—as a member of the California Collegiate Athletic Association (CCAA) during the 1959 college football season. Led by second-year head coach Don Reed, the 49ers compiled an overall record of 4–5 with a mark of 2–3 in conference play, tying for fourth place in the CCAA. The team played home games at Veterans Memorial Stadium adjacent to the campus of Long Beach City College in Long Beach, California.

== Schedule ==
Date	Time	Opponent	Site	Result	Attendance	Source
September 18	8:15 pm	at UC Santa Barbara	La Playa Stadium; Santa Barbara, CA	L 19–27	7,500	
September 26	8:00 pm	Sacramento State*	Veterans Memorial Stadium; Long Beach, CA	W 19–0		
October 3	8:00 pm	San Francisco State*	Veterans Memorial Stadium; Long Beach, CA	L 0–12	4,000	
October 10	8:00 pm	at San Diego State	Aztec Bowl; San Diego, CA	W 14–6	7,500	
October 17	8:15 pm	at Cal Poly	Mustang Stadium; San Luis Obispo, CA	L 3–6		
October 24	2:00 pm	Los Angeles State^{†}	Veterans Memorial Stadium; Long Beach, CA	W 12–7	4,800	
October 31	8:00 pm	Cal Poly Pomona*	Veterans Memorial Stadium; Long Beach, CA	L 7–28		
November 7	8:00 pm	at Pepperdine*	Sentinel Field; Inglewood, CA	W 26–7	2,800	
November 13	8:00 pm	Fresno State	Veterans Memorial Stadium; Long Beach, CA	L 8–29	3,500	
*Non-conference game; ^{†}Homecoming
