= 1958 San Jose State Spartans football team =

American college football season

1958 San Jose State Spartans football
- Conference: Independent
- Record: 4–5
- Head coach: Bob Titchenal (2nd season)
- Home stadium: Spartan Stadium

1958 Western major college football independents records
	Conf.			Overall
Team	W	L	T	W		L		T
No. 6 Air Force		–		9	–	0	–	2
Pacific (CA)		–		6	–	4	–	0
San Jose State		–		4	–	5	–	0
Rankings from AP poll

The 1958 San Jose State Spartans football team represented San Jose State College—now known as San Jose State University—as an independent during the 1958 college football season. Led by second-year head coach Bob Titchenal, the Spartans compiled a record of 4–5 and outscored opponents 174 to 106. The team played home games at Spartan Stadium in San Jose, California.

== Schedule ==
Date	Opponent	Site	Result	Attendance	Source
September 20	at Washington	Husky Stadium; Seattle, WA	L 6–14	28,000	
September 27	Hawaii	Spartan Stadium; San Jose, CA (rivalry)	L 6–8	11,000–11,500	
October 11	No. 12 Cal Poly	Spartan Stadium; San Jose, CA	L 6–10	13,500	
October 18	at Arizona State	Sun Devil Stadium; Tempe, AZ	W 21–20	29,000	
October 25	Denver	Spartan Stadium; San Jose, CA	W 27–7	13,000	
November 1	at Idaho	Bronco Stadium; Boise, ID	W 41–6	9,500	
November 8	at Pacific (CA)	Pacific Memorial Stadium; Stockton, CA (Victory Bell)	L 13–26	28,000	
November 15	Fresno State^{†}	Spartan Stadium; San Jose, CA (rivalry)	W 48–6	12,000	
November 21	Iowa State	Spartan Stadium; San Jose, CA	L 6–9	12,000	
^{†}Homecoming; Rankings from UPI Poll released prior to the game; Source:

== Team players in the NFL ==
The following San Jose State players were selected in the 1959 NFL draft.

Player	Position	Round	Overall	NFL team
Daniel Colchico	Defensive end	7	78	San Francisco 49ers
Art Powell	Split End – Defensive back – Wide receiver	11	123	Philadelphia Eagles
