= 1958 San Francisco State Gators football team =

American college football season

1958 San Francisco State Gators football

FWC champion
- Conference: Far Western Conference
- Record: 7–3 (4–1 FWC)
- Head coach: Joe Verducci (9th season)
- Home stadium: Cox Stadium

1958 Far Western Conference football standings
	Conf.					Overall
Team	W		L		T	W		L		T
San Francisco State $	4	–	1	–	0	7	–	3	–	0
Humboldt State	3	–	2	–	0	7	–	2	–	1
Cal Aggies	3	–	2	–	0	5	–	4	–	0
Chico State	2	–	3	–	0	5	–	5	–	0
Nevada	2	–	3	–	0	3	–	3	–	0
Sacramento State	1	–	4	–	0	3	–	6	–	0
$ – Conference champion

The 1958 San Francisco State Gators football team represented San Francisco State College—now known as San Francisco State University—as a member of the Far Western Conference (FWC) during the 1958 college football season. Led by ninth-year head coach Joe Verducci, San Francisco State compiled an overall record of 7–3 with a mark of 4–1 in conference play, winning the FWC title for the third consecutive season. For the season the team outscored its opponents 184 to 146. The Gators played home games at Cox Stadium in San Francisco.

== Schedule ==
Date	Opponent	Site	Result	Attendance	Source
September 19	Long Beach State*	Cox Stadium; San Francisco, CA	W 14–0	3,500	
September 26	Cal Poly Pomona*	Cox Stadium; San Francisco, CA	W 20–18	2,500	
October 4	at Humboldt State	Redwood Bowl; Arcata, CA	L 12–13	5,000–6,000	
October 10	Occidental*	Cox Stadium; San Francisco, CA	W 25–16	4,000	
October 18	at Nevada	Mackay Stadium (Note: This stadium is the predecessor to the current Mackay Stadium, which was opened for the 1966 season.); Reno, NV	W 18–6	2,000–3,000	
October 25	at UC Santa Barbara*	La Playa Stadium; Santa Barbara, CA	L 14–20	9,500	
October 31	at Cal Aggies	Aggie Field; Davis, CA	W 27–14	3,000	
November 8	Sacramento State	Cox Stadium; San Francisco, CA	W 20–18	4,500	
November 14	Chico State	Cox Stadium; San Francisco, CA	W 34–6	3,000	
November 22	at Fresno State*	Ratcliffe Stadium; Fresno, CA	L 0–35	6,351	
*Non-conference game

== Team players in the NFL ==
The following San Francisco State players were selected in the 1959 NFL draft.

Player	Position	Round	Overall	NFL team
Floyd Peters	Defensive tackle	8	93	Baltimore Colts
