= 1958 Montana State Bobcats football team =

American college football season

1958 Montana State Bobcats football
- Conference: Independent
- Record: 8–1
- Head coach: Herb Agocs (1st season)
- Home stadium: Gatton Field

1958 Western non-major college football independents records
	Conf.			Overall
Team	W	L	T	W		L		T
No. 6 Montana State		–		8	–	1	–	0
Cal Poly Pomona		–		7	–	3	–	0
UC Riverside		–		2	–	3	–	2
Hawaii		–		5	–	7	–	0
Pepperdine		–		1	–	7	–	0
Rankings from UPI small college poll

The 1958 Montana State Bobcats football team was an American football team that represented Montana State College (now known as Montana State University) as an independent during the 1958 college football season. In its first season under head coach Herb Agocs, the team compiled an 8–1 record.

== Schedule ==
Date	Opponent	Rank	Site	Result	Attendance	Source
September 20	at North Dakota		Memorial Stadium; Grand Forks, ND	W 15–8	6,000	
September 27	South Dakota State	No. 14	Gatton Field; Bozeman, MT	W 23–6	5,700–6,700	
October 4	at San Diego	No. 9	Balboa Stadium; San Diego, CA	W 31–6	7,300	
October 11	at North Dakota State	No. 10	Dacotah Field; Fargo, ND	W 33–20	5,000	
October 18	No. 4 Idaho State^{†}	No. 7	Gatton Field; Bozeman, MT	W 17–6	8,500	
October 25	Omaha	No. 5	Gatton Field; Bozeman, MT	W 42–0	3,100	
November 1	St. Ambrose	No. 2	Gatton Field; Bozeman, MT	W 39–18	5,000	
November 8	at No. 18 Cal Poly	No. 2	Mustang Stadium; San Luis Obispo, CA	L 6–16	6,000–7,000	
November 15	at Montana	No. 7	Dornblaser Field; Missoula, MT (rivalry)	W 20–6	7,500	
^{†}Homecoming; Rankings from UPI Poll released prior to the game
