= 1959 Hawaii Rainbows football team =

American college football season

1959 Hawaii Rainbows football
- Conference: Independent
- Record: 3–6
- Head coach: Hank Vasconcellos (8th season)
- Home stadium: Honolulu Stadium

1959 Western non-major college football independents records
	Conf.			Overall
Team	W	L	T	W		L		T
Cal Poly Pomona		–		7	–	1	–	1
Santa Clara		–		4	–	1	–	0
UC Riverside		–		5	–	2	–	0
Montana State		–		6	–	3	–	0
Hawaii		–		3	–	6	–	0
Pepperdine		–		2	–	5	–	1

The 1959 Hawaii Rainbows football team represented the University of Hawaiʻi at Mānoa as an independent during the 1959 college football season. In their eighth season under head coach Hank Vasconcellos, the Rainbows compiled a 3–6 record.

== Schedule ==
Date	Opponent	Site	Result	Attendance	Source
August 21	Hawaii All-Stars	Honolulu Stadium; Honolulu, HI	L 0–13	18,792	
September 19	at Southern Oregon	Ashland, OR	W 20–13		
September 26	at Idaho State	Spud Bowl; Pocatello, ID	W 14–8	5,000	
October 3	at San Jose State	Spartan Stadium; San Jose, CA (rivalry)	L 14–44	10,000	
October 30	Pacific (CA)	Honolulu Stadium; Honolulu, HI	L 0–6	20,000	
November 13	Los Angeles State	Honolulu Stadium; Honolulu, HI	W 27–6	7,000	
November 27	Fresno State	Honolulu Stadium; Honolulu, HI (rivalry)	L 13–22	8,000	
December 4	Arizona State	Honolulu Stadium; Honolulu, HI	L 6–14	8,000	
December 11	Utah State^{†}	Honolulu Stadium; Honolulu, HI	L 6–48	7,000	
^{†}Homecoming
