= 1958 Humboldt State Lumberjacks football team =

American college football season

1958 Humboldt State Lumberjacks football
- Conference: Far Western Conference
- Record: 7–2–1 (3–2 FWC)
- Head coach: Phil Sarboe (8th season)
- Home stadium: Redwood Bowl

1958 Far Western Conference football standings
	Conf.					Overall
Team	W		L		T	W		L		T
San Francisco State $	4	–	1	–	0	7	–	3	–	0
Humboldt State	3	–	2	–	0	7	–	2	–	1
Cal Aggies	3	–	2	–	0	5	–	4	–	0
Chico State	2	–	3	–	0	5	–	5	–	0
Nevada	2	–	3	–	0	3	–	3	–	0
Sacramento State	1	–	4	–	0	3	–	6	–	0
$ – Conference champion

The 1958 Humboldt State Lumberjacks football team represented Humboldt State College—now known as California State Polytechnic University, Humboldt—as a member of the Far Western Conference (FWC) during the 1958 college football season. Led by eighth-year head coach Phil Sarboe, the Lumberjacks compiled an overall record of 7–2–1 with a mark of 3–2 in conference play, tying for second place in the FWC, and outscored their opponents 176 to 109 for the season. The team played home games at the Redwood Bowl in Arcata, California.

== Schedule ==
Date	Opponent	Site	Result	Attendance	Source
September 20	College of Idaho*	Redwood Bowl; Arcata, CA	W 30–12	4,000	
September 27	Pacific Lutheran*	Redwood Bowl; Arcata, CA	W 29–0	4,000	
October 4	San Francisco State	Redwood Bowl; Arcata, CA	W 13–12	5,000–6,000	
October 11	at Sacramento State	Grant Stadium; Sacramento, CA	W 9–0	2,700	
October 18	at Cal Aggies	Aggie Field; Davis, CA	L 6–18	3,000	
October 25	Central Washington*	Redwood Bowl; Arcata, CA	T 27–27	3,000	
November 1	Chico State	Redwood Bowl; Arcata, CA	W 18–0	6,100	
November 8	at Nevada	Mackay Stadium (Note: This stadium is the predecessor to the current Mackay Stadium, which was opened for the 1966 season.); Reno, NV	L 12–22	1,500–1,800	
November 14	at Hawaii*	Honolulu Stadium; Honolulu, HI	W 12–6	5,000	
November 27	Whitworth*	Redwood Bowl; Arcata, CA	W 20–12	2,500	
*Non-conference game
