= 1959 Nevada Wolf Pack football team =

American college football season

1959 Nevada Wolf Pack football
- Conference: Far Western Conference
- Record: 4–3 (3–2 FWC)
- Head coach: Dick Trachok (1st season)
- Home stadium: Mackay Stadium

1959 Far Western Conference football standings
| | Conf. | | | | | Overall |
| Team | W | | L | | T | W | | L | | T |
|---|---|---|---|---|---|---|---|---|---|---|
| No. 17 San Francisco State $ | 5 | – | 0 | – | 0 | 10 | – | 0 | – | 0 |
| Humboldt State | 4 | – | 1 | – | 0 | 9 | – | 1 | – | 0 |
| Nevada | 3 | – | 2 | – | 0 | 4 | – | 3 | – | 0 |
| Chico State | 2 | – | 3 | – | 0 | 4 | – | 4 | – | 0 |
| Sacramento State | 1 | – | 4 | – | 0 | 2 | – | 7 | – | 0 |
| UC Davis | 0 | – | 5 | – | 0 | 1 | – | 8 | – | 0 |
$ – Conference champion; Rankings from UPI small college poll

The 1959 Nevada Wolf Pack football team represented the University of Nevada during the 1959 college football season. Nevada competed as a member of the Far Western Conference (FWC). The Wolf Pack were led by first-year head coach Dick Trachok and played their home games at Mackay Stadium.

== Schedule ==
| Date | Opponent | Site | Result | Attendance | Source |
|---|---|---|---|---|---|
| September 19 | Western State (CO)* | Mackay Stadium; Reno, NV | L 13–14 | 2,000 | |
| September 26 | at Pepperdine* | Sentinel Field; Inglewood, CA | W 27–12 | 1,800 | |
| October 3 | Chico State | Mackay Stadium; Reno, NV | W 27–8 | 3,000 | |
| October 10 | UC Davis | Mackay Stadium; Reno, NV | W 28–6 | 3,500–4,000 | |
| October 17 | San Francisco State^{†} | Mackay Stadium; Reno, NV | L 14–30 | 7,500 | |
| October 24 | at Sacramento State | Charles C. Hughes Stadium; Sacramento, CA | W 14–0 | 1,200 | |
| November 7 | at Humboldt State | Redwood Bowl; Arcata, CA | L 7–21 | 4,000 | |
*Non-conference game; ^{†}Homecoming
