= 1959 UC Davis Aggies football team =

American college football season

1959 UC Davis Aggies football
- Conference: Far Western Conference
- Record: 1–8 (0–5 FWC)
- Head coach: Will Lotter (4th season)
- Captain: Mack Smith
- Home stadium: Aggie Field

1959 Far Western Conference football standings
	Conf.					Overall
Team	W		L		T	W		L		T
No. 17 San Francisco State $	5	–	0	–	0	10	–	0	–	0
Humboldt State	4	–	1	–	0	9	–	1	–	0
Nevada	3	–	2	–	0	4	–	3	–	0
Chico State	2	–	3	–	0	4	–	4	–	0
Sacramento State	1	–	4	–	0	2	–	7	–	0
UC Davis	0	–	5	–	0	1	–	8	–	0
$ – Conference champion; Rankings from UPI small college poll

The 1959 UC Davis Aggies football team represented the University of California, Davis as a member of the Far Western Conference (FWC) during the 1959 college football season. Led by fourth-year head coach Will Lotter—who returned for his third stint after leading the team in 1954, 1956, and 1957—the Aggies compiled an overall record of 1–8 with a mark of 0–5 in conference play, placing last out of six teams in the FWC. The team was outscored by its opponents 197 to 64 for the season. The Aggies played home games at Aggie Field in Davis, California.

The UC Davis sports teams were commonly called the "Cal Aggies" from 1924 until the mid 1970s.

== Schedule ==
Date	Opponent	Site	Result	Attendance	Source
September 19	at Whittier*	Hadley Field; Whittier, CA	L 0–21	2,500	
September 26	Pacific (OR)*	Aggie Field; Davis, CA	W 14–7	3,000	
October 3	Occidental*	Aggie Field; Davis, CA	L 8–13	2,400	
October 10	at Nevada	Mackay Stadium (Note: This stadium is the predecessor to the current Mackay Stadium, which was opened for the 1966 season.); Reno, NV	L 6–28	3,500–4,000	
October 17	vs. UC Santa Barbara (Note: The game against UC Santa Barbara was part of an "All-UC Doubleheader" that was held annually from 1948 to 1963. The other game of the double-header was California vs. UCLA. The games were always held at the home stadium of either Cal or UCLA.)*	Los Angeles Memorial Coliseum; Los Angeles, CA	L 8–10	7,000–38,000	
October 24	at Humboldt State	Redwood Bowl; Arcata, CA	L 12–21		
October 31	at San Francisco State	Cox Stadium; San Francisco, CA	L 0–46		
November 7	Chico State	Aggie Field; Davis, CA	L 10–30		
November 14	Sacramento State	Aggie Field; Davis, CA (rivalry)	L 6–21		
*Non-conference game
