= 1958 Pepperdine Waves football team =

American college football season

1958 Pepperdine Waves football
- Conference: Independent
- Record: 1–7
- Head coach: John Scolinos (4th season)
- Home stadium: El Camino Stadium

1958 Western non-major college football independents records
| | Conf. | | | Overall |
| Team | W | L | T | W | | L | | T |
|---|---|---|---|---|---|---|---|---|
| No. 6 Montana State | | – | | 8 | – | 1 | – | 0 |
| Cal Poly Pomona | | – | | 7 | – | 3 | – | 0 |
| UC Riverside | | – | | 2 | – | 3 | – | 2 |
| Hawaii | | – | | 5 | – | 7 | – | 0 |
| Pepperdine | | – | | 1 | – | 7 | – | 0 |
Rankings from UPI small college poll

The 1958 Pepperdine Waves football team represented George Pepperdine College (Note: Pepperdine University was known as George Pepperdine College from 1937 to 1970.) as an independent during the 1958 college football season. The team was led by fourth-year head coach John Scolinos and played home games at El Camino Stadium on the campus of El Camino College in Torrance, California. They finished the season with a record of 1–7.

== Schedule ==
| Date | Opponent | Site | Result | Attendance | Source |
|---|---|---|---|---|---|
| September 20 | at Nevada | Mackay Stadium (Note: This stadium is the predecessor to the current Mackay Stadium, which was opened for the 1966 season.); Reno, NV | L 7–12 | | |
| September 27 | at San Diego State | Aztec Bowl; San Diego, CA | L 0–6 | 8,200 | |
| October 3 | Los Angeles State | El Camino Stadium; Torrance, CA ("Old Shoe" rivalry) | L 6–22 | | |
| October 11 | at Whittier | Hadley Field; Whittier, CA | L 19–36 | 4,500 | |
| October 18 | at Redlands | Redlands Stadium (Note: This stadium is the predecessor to the current Ted Runner Stadium on the University of Redlands campus, which was opened for the 1968 season); Redlands, CA | L 6–12 | | |
| October 25 | Cal Poly Pomona | El Camino Stadium; Torrance, CA | L 22–35 | | |
| November 1 | at Long Beach State | Veterans Stadium; Long Beach, CA | W 26–22 | 4,887 | |
| November 15 | San Diego | El Camino Stadium; Torrance, CA | L 13–45 | | |
