= 1959 Pepperdine Waves football team =

American college football season

1959 Pepperdine Waves football
- Conference: Independent
- Record: 2–5–1
- Head coach: John Scolinos (5th season)
- Home stadium: Sentinel Field

1959 Western non-major college football independents records
	Conf.			Overall
Team	W	L	T	W		L		T
Cal Poly Pomona		–		7	–	1	–	1
Santa Clara		–		4	–	1	–	0
UC Riverside		–		5	–	2	–	0
Montana State		–		6	–	3	–	0
Hawaii		–		3	–	6	–	0
Pepperdine		–		2	–	5	–	1

The 1959 Pepperdine Waves football team represented George Pepperdine College (Note: Pepperdine University was known as George Pepperdine College from 1937 to 1970.) as an independent during the 1959 college football season. The team was led by fifth-year head coach John Scolinos. For the 1959 season, the Waves moved home games back to Sentinel Field on the campus of Inglewood High School in Inglewood, California. They had previously played at Sentinel Field in 1946, 1947, and 1949. Pepperdine finished the season with a record of 2–5–1.

== Schedule ==
Date	Time	Opponent	Site	Result	Attendance	Source
September 26		at Nevada	Mackay Stadium (Note: This stadium is the predecessor to the current Mackay Stadium, which was opened for the 1966 season.); Reno, NV	L 12–27		
October 3		at Los Angeles State	Rose Bowl; Pasadena, CA ("Old Shoe" rivalry)	L 14–48		
October 10		Whittier	Sentinel Field; Inglewood, CA	L 6–23		
October 17		at San Diego	Balboa Stadium; San Diego, CA	W 19–6		
October 23	8:00 p.m.	Cal Poly Pomona	Pomona Catholic High School; Pomona, CA	L 14–30		
October 31		at Cal Western (Note: Alliant International University was formed in 2001 via the merger of United States International University (USIU) and California School of Professional Psychology. USIU had been known as California Western University (Cal Western) from 1952 to 1967.)	Balboa Stadium?; San Diego, CA	W 31–7		
November 7		Long Beach State^{†}	Sentinel Field; Inglewood, CA	L 7–26	2,800	
November 14		San Diego State	Sentinel Field; Inglewood, CA	T 14–14	1,500	
^{†}Homecoming; All times are in Pacific time
