= 1958 Long Beach State 49ers football team =

American college football season

1958 Long Beach State 49ers football
- Conference: California Collegiate Athletic Association
- Record: 2–6–1 (1–3–1 CCAA)
- Head coach: Don Reed (1st season)
- Home stadium: Veterans Memorial Stadium

1958 California Collegiate Athletic Association football standings
	Conf.					Overall
Team	W		L		T	W		L		T
No. 15 Cal Poly +	4	–	1	–	0	9	–	1	–	0
Fresno State +	4	–	1	–	0	5	–	5	–	0
UC Santa Barbara	3	–	2	–	0	4	–	4	–	1
San Diego State	2	–	3	–	0	3	–	5	–	0
Long Beach State	1	–	3	–	1	2	–	6	–	1
Los Angeles State	0	–	4	–	1	4	–	4	–	1
+ – Conference co-champions; Rankings from UPI small college poll

The 1958 Long Beach State 49ers football team represented Long Beach State College—now known as California State University, Long Beach—as a member of the California Collegiate Athletic Association (CCAA) during the 1958 college football season. Led by first-year head coach Don Reed, the 49ers compiled an overall record of 2–6–1 with a mark of 1–3–1 in conference play, placing fifth in the CCAA. The team played home games at Veterans Memorial Stadium adjacent to the campus of Long Beach City College in Long Beach, California.

== Schedule ==
Date	Opponent	Site	Result	Attendance	Source
September 20	at San Francisco State*	Cox Stadium; San Francisco, CA	L 0–14	3,500	
September 27	at Sacramento State*	Grant Stadium; Sacramento, CA	L 14–26	3,500	
October 3	San Diego State	Veterans Stadium; Long Beach, CA	L 12–20	3,000	
October 11	Chico State*	Veterans Memorial Stadium; Long Beach, CA	W 28–8	2,300	
October 18	UC Santa Barbara	Veterans Memorial Stadium; Long Beach, CA	W 12–7	3,500	
October 25	at No. 18 Cal Poly	Mustang Stadium; San Luis Obispo, CA	L 2–26		
November 1	Pepperdine*^{†}	Veterans Memorial Stadium; Long Beach, CA	L 22–26	4,887	
November 8	at Fresno State	Ratcliffe Stadium; Fresno, CA	L 6–22	8,000	
November 15	at Los Angeles State	Rose Bowl; Pasadena, CA	T 6–6	1,720	
*Non-conference game; ^{†}Homecoming; Rankings from UPI Poll released prior to the game
