= 1959 UC Santa Barbara Gauchos football team =

American college football season

1959 UC Santa Barbara Gauchos football
- Conference: California Collegiate Athletic Association
- Record: 6–4 (2–3 CCAA)
- Head coach: Ed Cody (4th season)
- Home stadium: La Playa Stadium

1959 California Collegiate Athletic Association football standings
	Conf.					Overall
Team	W		L		T	W		L		T
Fresno State $	5	–	0	–	0	7	–	3	–	0
Los Angeles State	3	–	2	–	0	7	–	3	–	0
Cal Poly	3	–	2	–	0	6	–	3	–	0
UC Santa Barbara	2	–	3	–	0	6	–	4	–	0
Long Beach State	2	–	3	–	0	4	–	5	–	0
San Diego State	0	–	5	–	0	1	–	6	–	1
$ – Conference champion

The 1959 UC Santa Barbara Gauchos football team represented University of California, Santa Barbara (UCSB) during the 1959 college football season.

UCSB competed in the California Collegiate Athletic Association (CCAA). The team was led by fourth-year head coach Ed Cody, and played home games at La Playa Stadium in Santa Barbara, California. They finished the season with a record of six wins and four losses (6–4, 2–3 CCAA).

== Schedule ==
Date	Opponent	Site	Result	Attendance	Source
September 18	Long Beach State	La Playa Stadium; Santa Barbara, CA	W 27–19	7,500	
September 26	Whittier*	La Playa Stadium; Santa Barbara, CA	W 20–15	8,000	
October 3	at Fresno State	Ratcliffe Stadium; Fresno, CA	L 12–28	7,929–10,000	
October 9	Los Angeles State	La Playa Stadium; Santa Barbara, CA	L 0–19	8,200	
October 17	vs. UC Davis (Note: The game against UC Davis was part of an "All-UC Doubleheader" that was held annually from 1948 to 1963. The other game of the double-header was California vs. UCLA. The games were always held at the home stadium of either Cal or UCLA.)*	Los Angeles Memorial Coliseum; Los Angeles, CA	W 10–8	7,000–38,000	
October 24	at San Francisco State*	Cox Stadium; San Francisco, CA	L 14–28	3,500–4,000	
October 31	Occidental*	La Playa Stadium; Santa Barbara, CA	W 35–6	7,800	
November 7	at San Diego State	Aztec Bowl; San Diego, CA	W 29–7	5,500–6,500	
November 13	Southern California College*	La Playa Stadium; Santa Barbara, CA	W 83–6	3,500	
November 20	at Cal Poly	Mustang Stadium; San Luis Obispo, CA	L 20–48	5,500	
*Non-conference game
