= 1958 Nevada Wolf Pack football team =

American college football season

1958 Nevada Wolf Pack football
- Conference: Far Western Conference
- Record: 3–3 (2–3 FWC)
- Head coach: Gordon McEachron (4th season)
- Home stadium: Mackay Stadium

1958 Far Western Conference football standings
	Conf.					Overall
Team	W		L		T	W		L		T
San Francisco State $	4	–	1	–	0	7	–	3	–	0
Humboldt State	3	–	2	–	0	7	–	2	–	1
Cal Aggies	3	–	2	–	0	5	–	4	–	0
Chico State	2	–	3	–	0	5	–	5	–	0
Nevada	2	–	3	–	0	3	–	3	–	0
Sacramento State	1	–	4	–	0	3	–	6	–	0
$ – Conference champion

The 1958 Nevada Wolf Pack football team represented the University of Nevada during the 1958 college football season. Nevada competed as a member of the Far Western Conference (FWC). The Wolf Pack were led by fourth-year head coach Gordon McEachron, who resigned after the end of the season. They played their home games at Mackay Stadium.

== Schedule ==
Date	Opponent	Site	Result	Attendance	Source
September 20	Pepperdine*	Mackay Stadium; Reno, NV	W 12–7	2,200	
October 4	at Chico State	College Field; Chico, CA	L 18–22	4,800–5,100	
October 10	at Cal Aggies	Aggie Field; Davis, CA	L 2–14	1,900	
October 18	San Francisco State	Mackay Stadium; Reno, NV	L 6–18	2,000–3,000	
October 25	Sacramento State^{†}	Mackay Stadium; Reno, NV	W 40–24	2,300	
November 8	Humboldt State	Mackay Stadium; Reno, NV	W 22–12	1,500–1,800	
*Non-conference game; ^{†}Homecoming
