= 1958 Cal Poly Mustangs football team =

American college football season

1958 Cal Poly Mustangs football

CCAA co-champion
- Conference: California Collegiate Athletic Association

Ranking
- Coaches: No. 15 (small college)
- Record: 9–1 (4–1 CCAA)
- Head coach: LeRoy Hughes (9th season)
- Home stadium: Mustang Stadium

1958 California Collegiate Athletic Association football standings
	Conf.					Overall
Team	W		L		T	W		L		T
No. 15 Cal Poly +	4	–	1	–	0	9	–	1	–	0
Fresno State +	4	–	1	–	0	5	–	5	–	0
UC Santa Barbara	3	–	2	–	0	4	–	4	–	1
San Diego State	2	–	3	–	0	3	–	5	–	0
Long Beach State	1	–	3	–	1	2	–	6	–	1
Los Angeles State	0	–	4	–	1	4	–	4	–	1
+ – Conference co-champions; Rankings from UPI small college poll

The 1958 Cal Poly Mustangs football team represented California Polytechnic State College—now known as California Polytechnic State University, San Luis Obispo—as a member of the California Collegiate Athletic Association (CCAA) during the 1958 college football season. Led by ninth-year head coach LeRoy Hughes, Cal Poly compiled an overall record of 9–1 with a mark of 4–1 in conference play, sharing the CCAA title with Fresno State. The team outscored its opponents 321 to 60 for the season. The Mustangs played home games at Mustang Stadium in San Luis Obispo, California.

== Schedule ==
Date	Time	Opponent	Rank	Site	Result	Attendance	Source
September 20		Colorado State–Greeley*		Mustang Stadium; San Luis Obispo, CA	W 25–6		
September 27		Los Angeles State*	No. 11	Mustang Stadium; San Luis Obispo, CA	W 55–0		
October 4		at College of Idaho	No. 11	Mustang Stadium; San Luis Obispo, CA	W 53–0		
October 11		at San Jose State*	No. 12	Spartan Stadium; San Jose, CA	W 10–6	13,500	
October 18		at Fresno State	No. 11	Ratcliffe Stadium; Fresno, CA	L 0–14	9,449	
October 25		Long Beach State	No. 18	Mustang Stadium; San Luis Obispo, CA	W 26–2		
November 1		Pacific (OR)	No. 18	Mustang Stadium; San Luis Obispo, CA	W 48–0		
November 8		No. 2 Montana State*	No. 18	Mustang Stadium; San Luis Obispo, CA	W 16–6	6,000–7,000	
November 15		San Diego State	No. 13	Mustang Stadium; San Luis Obispo, CA	W 48–14	2,000	
November 21	8:15 p.m.	at UC Santa Barbara	No. 12	La Playa Stadium; Santa Barbara, CA	W 40–12	8,600–9,000	
*Non-conference game; Rankings from UPI Poll released prior to the game; All times are in Pacific time
