= 1959 Fresno State Bulldogs football team =

American college football season

1959 Fresno State Bulldogs football

CCAA champion
- Conference: California Collegiate Athletic Association
- Record: 7–3 (5–0 CCAA)
- Head coach: Cecil Coleman (1st season)
- Home stadium: Ratcliffe Stadium

1959 California Collegiate Athletic Association football standings
	Conf.					Overall
Team	W		L		T	W		L		T
Fresno State $	5	–	0	–	0	7	–	3	–	0
Los Angeles State	3	–	2	–	0	7	–	3	–	0
Cal Poly	3	–	2	–	0	6	–	3	–	0
UC Santa Barbara	2	–	3	–	0	6	–	4	–	0
Long Beach State	2	–	3	–	0	4	–	5	–	0
San Diego State	0	–	5	–	0	1	–	6	–	1
$ – Conference champion

The 1959 Fresno State Bulldogs football team represented Fresno State College—now known as California State University, Fresno—as a member of the California Collegiate Athletic Association (CCAA) during the 1959 college football season.

Led by first-year head coach Cecil Coleman, Fresno State compiled an overall record of 7–3 with a mark of 5–0 in conference play, winning the CCAA title for the second consecutive year. The Bulldogs played home games at Ratcliffe Stadium on the campus of Fresno City College in Fresno, California.

== Schedule ==
Date	Opponent	Site	Result	Attendance	Source
September 26	BYU*	Ratcliffe Stadium; Fresno, CA	W 27–16	8,234	
October 3	UC Santa Barbara	Ratcliffe Stadium; Fresno, CA	W 28–12	7,929–10,000	
October 10	San Diego Marines (Note: The Marine Corps Recruit Depot (MCRD) in San Diego fielded a team that played against colleges and other military teams from 1922 to 1964.)*	Ratcliffe Stadium; Fresno, CA	L 6–13	7,553	
October 17	San Jose State*	Ratcliffe Stadium; Fresno, CA (rivalry)	L 14–40	10,907	
October 24	at Cal Poly	Mustang Stadium; San Luis Obispo, CA	W 28–13	8,000	
October 31	San Diego State	Ratcliffe Stadium; Fresno, CA (rivalry)	W 38–13	5,950	
November 7	at Pacific (CA)*	Pacific Memorial Stadium; Stockton, CA	L 13–18	12,500	
November 14	at Long Beach State	Veterans Stadium; Long Beach, CA	W 29–8	3,500	
November 21	Los Angeles State	Ratcliffe Stadium; Fresno, CA	W 21–0	12,440	
November 27	at Hawaii*	Honolulu Stadium; Honolulu, HI (rivalry)	W 22–13	10,011	
*Non-conference game

== Team players in the NFL ==
The following were selected in the 1960 NFL draft.

Player	Position	Round	Overall	NFL team
Doug Brown	Defensive tackle	12	134	Los Angeles Rams
