= 1958 Los Angeles State Diablos football team =

American college football season

1958 Los Angeles State Diablos football
- Conference: California Collegiate Athletic Association
- Record: 4–4–1 (0–4–1 CCAA)
- Head coach: Leonard Adams (8th season)
- Home stadium: Rose Bowl; East Los Angeles College Stadium

1958 California Collegiate Athletic Association football standings
	Conf.					Overall
Team	W		L		T	W		L		T
No. 15 Cal Poly +	4	–	1	–	0	9	–	1	–	0
Fresno State +	4	–	1	–	0	5	–	5	–	0
UC Santa Barbara	3	–	2	–	0	4	–	4	–	1
San Diego State	2	–	3	–	0	3	–	5	–	0
Long Beach State	1	–	3	–	1	2	–	6	–	1
Los Angeles State	0	–	4	–	1	4	–	4	–	1
+ – Conference co-champions; Rankings from UPI small college poll

The 1958 Los Angeles State Diablos football team represented Los Angeles State College—now known as California State University, Los Angeles—as a member of the California Collegiate Athletic Association (CCAA) during the 1958 college football season. Led by eighth-year head coach Leonard Adams, Los Angeles State compiled an overall record of 4–4–1 with a mark of 0–4–1 in conference play, placing last out of six teams in the CCAA. The Diablos played four home games at the Rose Bowl in Pasadena, California and one home game at East Los Angeles College Stadium in Monterey Park, California.

== Schedule ==
Date	Opponent	Site	Result	Attendance	Source
September 13	University of Mexico*	East Los Angeles College Stadium; Monterey Park, CA	W 23–6	11,500	
September 20	Sacramento State*	Rose Bowl; Pasadena, CA	W 8–6	1,500	
September 27	at Cal Poly	Mustang Stadium; San Luis Obispo, CA	L 0–55	6,500	
October 3	at Pepperdine*	El Camino Stadium; Torrance, CA ("Old Shoe" rivalry)	W 22–6	1,500	
October 11	UC Santa Barbara	Rose Bowl; Pasadena, CA	L 6–20	1,000–1,450	
October 18	at San Diego State	Aztec Bowl; San Diego, CA	L 0–7	3,500–9,000	
October 25	Fresno State	Rose Bowl; Pasadena, CA	L 6–7	735–1,300	
October 31	at Mexico Poly*	Estadio Wilfrido Massieu; Mexico City, Mexico	W 36–30	33,000	
November 15	Long Beach State	Rose Bowl; Pasadena, CA	T 6–6	1,720	
*Non-conference game

== Team players in the NFL ==
The following Los Angeles State players were selected in the 1959 NFL draft.

Player	Position	Round	Overall	NFL team
John Adams	End, fullback	5	57	Chicago Bears
Dave Halden	Tackle	18	208	Detroit Lions
