= 1959 Humboldt State Lumberjacks football team =

American college football season

1959 Humboldt State Lumberjacks football
- Conference: Far Western Conference
- Record: 9–1 (4–1 FWC)
- Head coach: Phil Sarboe (9th season)
- Home stadium: Redwood Bowl

1959 Far Western Conference football standings
	Conf.					Overall
Team	W		L		T	W		L		T
No. 17 San Francisco State $	5	–	0	–	0	10	–	0	–	0
Humboldt State	4	–	1	–	0	9	–	1	–	0
Nevada	3	–	2	–	0	4	–	3	–	0
Chico State	2	–	3	–	0	4	–	4	–	0
Sacramento State	1	–	4	–	0	2	–	7	–	0
UC Davis	0	–	5	–	0	1	–	8	–	0
$ – Conference champion; Rankings from UPI small college poll

The 1959 Humboldt State Lumberjacks football team represented Humboldt State College—now known as California State Polytechnic University, Humboldt—as a member of the Far Western Conference (FWC) during the 1959 college football season. Led by ninth-year head coach Phil Sarboe, the Lumberjacks compiled an overall record of 9–1 with a mark of 4–1 in conference play, placing second in the FWC, and outscored their opponents 191 to 137 for the season. Humboldt State lost their first game before reeling off a nine-game winning streak. The team played home games at the Redwood Bowl in Arcata, California.

== Schedule ==
Date	Opponent	Site	Result	Attendance	Source
September 19	at San Francisco State	Cox Stadium; San Francisco, CA	L 0–28	3,000	
September 26	Oregon College*	Redwood Bowl; Arcata, CA	W 18–7		
October 3	Seattle Ramblers (club team)*	Redwood Bowl; Arcata, CA	W 14–13		
October 10	Sacramento State	Redwood Bowl; Arcata, CA	W 38–20		
October 17	Western Washington*	Redwood Bowl; Arcata, CA	W 7–3		
October 24	UC Davis	Redwood Bowl; Arcata, CA	W 21–12		
October 31	at Chico State	College Field; Chico, CA	W 13–12	3,000	
November 7	Nevada	Redwood Bowl; Arcata, CA	W 21–7	4,000	
November 13	at Southern Oregon*	Fuller Field; Ashland, OR	W 20–7		
November 26	Whittier*	Redwood Bowl; Arcata, CA	W 39–28		
*Non-conference game
