= 1958 Idaho State Bengals football team =

American college football season

1958 Idaho State Bengals football
- Conference: Rocky Mountain Conference
- Record: 4–5 (3–2 RMC)
- Head coach: Babe Caccia (7th season)
- Home stadium: Spud Bowl

1958 Rocky Mountain Conference football standings
	Conf.					Overall
Team	W		L		T	W		L		T
Colorado Mines +	4	–	1	–	0	7	–	3	–	0
Colorado College +	4	–	1	–	0	6	–	3	–	0
Idaho State	3	–	2	–	0	4	–	5	–	0
Colorado State–Greeley	3	–	2	–	0	5	–	3	–	1
Adams State	1	–	4	–	0	1	–	8	–	0
Western State (CO)	0	–	5	–	0	1	–	8	–	0
+ – Conference co-champions

The 1958 Idaho State Bengals football team was an American football team that represented Idaho State College (now known as Idaho State University) as a member of the Rocky Mountain Conference (RMC) during the 1958 college football season. In their seventh season under head coach Babe Caccia, the Bengals compiled a 4–5 record, with a mark of 3–2 in conference play, and finished tied for third in the RMC.

== Schedule ==
Date	Opponent	Rank	Site	Result	Attendance	Source
September 20	Eastern Washington*		Spud Bowl; Pocatello, ID	W 30–7	2,500	
October 4	at Western State (CO)	No. 3	Gunnison, CO	W 7–0	3,000	
October 11	Adams State	No. 3	Spud Bowl; Pocatello, ID	W 26–0	2,500	
October 18	at No. 7 Montana State*	No. 4	Gatton Field; Bozeman, MT	L 7–16	8,500	
October 25	Colorado College^{†}	No. 14	Spud Bowl; Pocatello, ID	L 7–8	4,500	
October 31	at Colorado Mines		Brooks Field; Golden, CO	L 14–23		
November 8	Colorado State–Greeley		Spud Bowl; Pocatello, ID	W 14–6	1,500	
November 22	at San Diego*		Balboa Stadium; San Diego, CA	L 0–24		
November 29	at Hawaii*		Honolulu Stadium; Honolulu, Territory of Hawaii	L 19–40	2,000	
*Non-conference game; ^{†}Homecoming; Rankings from UPI Poll released prior to the game
