= 1958 Fresno State Bulldogs football team =

American college football season

1958 Fresno State Bulldogs football

CCAA co-champion
- Conference: California Collegiate Athletic Association
- Record: 5–5 (4–1 CCAA)
- Head coach: Clark Van Galder (7th season)
- Home stadium: Ratcliffe Stadium

1958 California Collegiate Athletic Association football standings
	Conf.					Overall
Team	W		L		T	W		L		T
No. 15 Cal Poly +	4	–	1	–	0	9	–	1	–	0
Fresno State +	4	–	1	–	0	5	–	5	–	0
UC Santa Barbara	3	–	2	–	0	4	–	4	–	1
San Diego State	2	–	3	–	0	3	–	5	–	0
Long Beach State	1	–	3	–	1	2	–	6	–	1
Los Angeles State	0	–	4	–	1	4	–	4	–	1
+ – Conference co-champions; Rankings from UPI small college poll

The 1958 Fresno State Bulldogs football team represented Fresno State College—now known as California State University, Fresno—as a member of the California Collegiate Athletic Association (CCAA) during the 1958 college football season. Led by Clark Van Galder in his seventh and final season as head coach, Fresno State compiled an overall record of 5–5 with a mark of 4–1 in conference play, sharing the CCAA title with Cal Poly. The Bulldogs played home games at Ratcliffe Stadium on the campus of Fresno City College in Fresno, California.

== Schedule ==
Date	Opponent	Site	Result	Attendance	Source
September 20	at BYU*	Cougar Stadium (Note: This stadium is the predecessor to the current Cougar Stadium, which was opened for the 1964 season); Provo, UT	L 7–29	7,155	
September 27	San Diego Marines (Note: The Marine Corps Recruit Depot (MCRD) in San Diego fielded a team that played against colleges and other military teams from 1922 to 1964.)*	Ratcliffe Stadium; Fresno, CA	L 6–20	6,621	
October 11	at UC Santa Barbara	La Playa Stadium; Santa Barbara, CA	L 22–25	7,000–7,500	
October 18	Cal Poly	Ratcliffe Stadium; Fresno, CA	W 14–0	9,449	
October 25	at Los Angeles State	Rose Bowl; Pasadena, CA	W 7–6	735–1,300	
November 1	San Diego State	Ratcliffe Stadium; Fresno, CA (rivalry)	W 22–20	6,392	
November 8	Long Beach State	Ratcliffe Stadium; Fresno, CA	W 22–6	8,000	
November 15	at San Jose State*	Spartan Stadium; San Jose, CA (rivalry)	L 6–48	12,000	
November 22	San Francisco State*	Ratcliffe Stadium; Fresno, CA	W 35–0	6,351	
November 29	Pacific (CA)*	Ratcliffe Stadium; Fresno, CA	L 6–52	9,768–11,500	
*Non-conference game
