= 1958 Sacramento State Hornets football team =

American college football season

1958 Sacramento State Hornets football
- Conference: Far Western Conference
- Record: 3–6 (1–4 FWC)
- Head coach: John W. Baker (2nd season)
- Home stadium: Grant Stadium

1958 Far Western Conference football standings
	Conf.					Overall
Team	W		L		T	W		L		T
San Francisco State $	4	–	1	–	0	7	–	3	–	0
Humboldt State	3	–	2	–	0	7	–	2	–	1
Cal Aggies	3	–	2	–	0	5	–	4	–	0
Chico State	2	–	3	–	0	5	–	5	–	0
Nevada	2	–	3	–	0	3	–	3	–	0
Sacramento State	1	–	4	–	0	3	–	6	–	0
$ – Conference champion

The 1958 Sacramento State Hornets football team represented Sacramento State College—now known as California State University, Sacramento—as a member of the Far Western Conference (FWC) during the 1958 college football season. Led by second-year head coach John W. Baker, Sacramento State compiled an overall record of 3–6 with a mark of 1–4 in conference play, placing last out of six teams in the FWC. The team finished with the first winning record in its four years of existence. For the season the team was outscored by its opponents 164 to 146. The Hornets played home games at Grant Stadium in Sacramento, California.

== Schedule ==
Date	Time	Opponent	Site	Result	Attendance	Source
September 20		at Los Angeles State*	Rose Bowl; Pasadena, CA	L 6–8	1,500	
September 27	8:00 p.m.	Long Beach State*	Grant Stadium; Sacramento, CA	W 26–14		
October 4		Whittier*	Grant Stadium; Sacramento, CA	W 20–18		
October 11	8:00 p.m.	Humboldt State	Grant Stadium; Sacramento, CA	L 0–9	2,700	
October 18		Chico State^{†}	Grant Stadium; Sacramento, CA	W 14–6	3,500	
October 25		at Nevada	Mackay Stadium (Note: This stadium is the predecessor to the current Mackay Stadium, which was opened for the 1966 season.); Reno, NV	L 24–40	2,300	
November 1		at Pomona*	Claremont Alumni Field; Claremont, CA	L 24–27		
November 8		at San Francisco State	Cox Stadium; San Francisco, CA	L 18–20	4,500	
November 15	8:00 p.m.	Cal Aggies	Grant Stadium; Sacramento, CA (rivalry)	L 14–22		
*Non-conference game; ^{†}Homecoming; All times are in Pacific time

== Team players in the NFL ==
The following Sacramento State players were selected in the 1959 NFL draft.

Player	Position	Round	Overall	NFL team
Dan Chamberlain	End, halfback	25	293	Detroit Lions
