= 1959 Montana State Bobcats football team =

American college football season

1959 Montana State Bobcats football
- Conference: Independent
- Record: 6–3
- Head coach: Herb Agocs (2nd season)
- Home stadium: Gatton Field

1959 Western non-major college football independents records
	Conf.			Overall
Team	W	L	T	W		L		T
Cal Poly Pomona		–		7	–	1	–	1
Santa Clara		–		4	–	1	–	0
UC Riverside		–		5	–	2	–	0
Montana State		–		6	–	3	–	0
Hawaii		–		3	–	6	–	0
Pepperdine		–		2	–	5	–	1

The 1959 Montana State Bobcats football team was an American football team that represented Montana State College (now known as Montana State University) as an independent during the 1959 college football season. In its second season under head coach Herb Agocs, the team compiled a 6–3 record.

== Schedule ==
Date	Opponent	Rank	Site	Result	Attendance	Source
September 12	at South Dakota State		State Field; Brookings, SD	W 27–0		
September 26	No. 12 Cal Poly	No. 13	Gatton Field; Bozeman, MT	W 35–18	6,200	
October 3	at Arizona State	No. 6	Sun Devil Stadium; Tempe, AZ	L 14–31	22,600	
October 10	North Dakota State^{†}	No. 7	Gatton Field; Bozeman, MT	W 24–12	7,500	
October 17	at Idaho State	No. 4	Spud Bowl; Pocatello, ID	L 0–6	5,500	
October 24	at Utah State	No. 10	Romney Stadium; Logan, UT	L 13–22	7,700	
October 31	North Dakota	No. 12	Gatton Field; Bozeman, MT	W 35–14		
November 7	Montana	No. 15	Gatton Field; Bozeman, MT (rivalry)	W 40–6		
November 14	at San Diego	No. T–14	Balboa Stadium; San Diego, CA	W 47–0	4,000	
^{†}Homecoming; Rankings from UPI Poll released prior to the game
