= 1958 Hawaii Rainbows football team =

American college football season

1958 Hawaii Rainbows football
- Conference: Independent
- Record: 5–7
- Head coach: Hank Vasconcellos (7th season)
- Home stadium: Honolulu Stadium

1958 Western non-major college football independents records
	Conf.			Overall
Team	W	L	T	W		L		T
No. 6 Montana State		–		8	–	1	–	0
Cal Poly Pomona		–		7	–	3	–	0
UC Riverside		–		2	–	3	–	2
Hawaii		–		5	–	7	–	0
Pepperdine		–		1	–	7	–	0
Rankings from UPI small college poll

The 1958 Hawaii Rainbows football team represented the University of Hawaiʻi at Mānoa as an independent during the 1958 college football season. In their seventh season under head coach Hank Vasconcellos, the Rainbows compiled a 5–7 record.

== Schedule ==
Date	Opponent	Site	Result	Attendance	Source
August 22	Honolulu All-Stars	Honolulu Stadium; Honolulu, Territory of Hawaii	W 6–0	23,000	
September 13	vs. Kentucky	Cardinal Stadium; Louisville, KY	L 0–51	16,000	
September 20	at Arizona State	Goodwin Stadium; Tempe, AZ	L 6–47	19,000	
September 27	at San Jose State	Spartan Stadium; San Jose, CA (rivalry)	W 8–6	11,000–11,500	
October 10	San Diego Marines	Honolulu Stadium; Honolulu, Territory of Hawaii	L 0–27	5,000	
October 19	Hawaii Rams	Honolulu Stadium; Honolulu, Territory of Hawaii	W 12–7	2,000	
October 26	Hawaii Marines	Honolulu Stadium; Honolulu, Territory of Hawaii	L 23–28	3,000	
November 2	Hawaii Rams	Honolulu Stadium; Honolulu, Territory of Hawaii	L 6–8	2,000	
November 8	Hawaii Marines	Honolulu Stadium; Honolulu, Territory of Hawaii	W 12–8	4,000	
November 14	Humboldt State	Honolulu Stadium; Honolulu, Territory of Hawaii	L 6–12	5,000	
November 29	Idaho State	Honolulu Stadium; Honolulu, Territory of Hawaii	W 40–19	2,000	
December 6	Utah^{†}	Honolulu Stadium; Honolulu, Territory of Hawaii	L 20–47	18,000	
^{†}Homecoming
