= 1959 Cal Poly Pomona Broncos football team =

American college football season

1959 Cal Poly Pomona Broncos football
- Conference: Independent
- Record: 7–1–1
- Head coach: Don Warhurst (3rd season)
- Home stadium: Pomona Catholic High School

1959 Western non-major college football independents records
	Conf.			Overall
Team	W	L	T	W		L		T
Cal Poly Pomona		–		7	–	1	–	1
Santa Clara		–		4	–	1	–	0
UC Riverside		–		5	–	2	–	0
Montana State		–		6	–	3	–	0
Hawaii		–		3	–	6	–	0
Pepperdine		–		2	–	5	–	1

The 1959 Cal Poly Pomona Broncos football team represented the Cal Poly Kellogg-Voorhis Unit—now known as California State Polytechnic University, Pomona—as an independent during the 1959 college football season. Led by third-year head coach Don Warhurst, Cal Poly Pomona compiled a record of 7–1–1. The team outscored its opponents 231 to 96 for the season. The Broncos played home games at Pomona Catholic High School in Pomona, California.

== Schedule ==
Date	Time	Opponent	Site	Result	Attendance	Source
September 19	8:00 p.m.	Mexico Poly	Spartan Field; Pomona, CA	W 22–6	4,500	
September 26		at San Francisco State	Cox Stadium; San Francisco, CA	L 14–34	2,500	
October 3	8:00 p.m.	San Diego	Pomona Catholic High School; Pomona, CA	W 42–12		
October 10		at La Verne	Bonita High School?; La Verne, CA	W 40–0		
October 17		at Mexico Poly	Estadio Wilfrido Massieu; Mexico City, Mexico	W 28–0		
October 23	8:00 p.m.	Pepperdine	Pomona Catholic High School; Pomona, CA	W 30–14		
October 31		at Long Beach State	Veterans Stadium; Long Beach, CA	W 28–7		
November 7		vs. Arizona State–Flagstaff	Yuma Union High School; Yuma, AZ	T 7–7		
November 14		at Redlands	Redlands Stadium (Note: This stadium is the predecessor to the current Ted Runner Stadium on the University of Redlands campus, which was opened for the 1968 season); Redlands, CA	W 20–16	4,500	
All times are in Pacific time

== Team players in the NFL/AFL ==
No Cal Poly Pomona players were selected in the 1960 NFL draft.

The following finished their Cal Poly Pomona career in 1959, were not drafted, but played in the NFL/AFL.

Player	Position	First NFL/AFL team
Fred Ford	Halfback	1960 Buffalo Bills
Vern Valdez	Defensive back	1960 Los Angeles Rams
