= 1958 Chico State Wildcats football team =

American college football season

1958 Chico State Wildcats football
- Conference: Far Western Conference
- Record: 5–5 (2–3 FWC)
- Head coach: George Maderos (1st season)
- Home stadium: College Field

1958 Far Western Conference football standings
	Conf.					Overall
Team	W		L		T	W		L		T
San Francisco State $	4	–	1	–	0	7	–	3	–	0
Humboldt State	3	–	2	–	0	7	–	2	–	1
Cal Aggies	3	–	2	–	0	5	–	4	–	0
Chico State	2	–	3	–	0	5	–	5	–	0
Nevada	2	–	3	–	0	3	–	3	–	0
Sacramento State	1	–	4	–	0	3	–	6	–	0
$ – Conference champion

The 1958 Chico State Wildcats football team represented Chico State College—now known as California State University, Chico—as a member of the Far Western Conference (FWC) during the 1958 college football season. Led by first-year head coach George Maderos, Chico State compiled an overall record of 5–5 with a mark of 2–3 in conference play, tying for fourth place in the FWC. The team was outscored by its opponents 192 to 162 for the season. The Wildcats played home games at College Field in Chico, California.

== Schedule ==
Date	Opponent	Site	Result	Attendance	Source
September 20	at Pacific (OR)*	Tom Reynolds Field; Forest Grove, OR	W 34–14	2,500	
September 27	Lewis & Clark*	College Field; Chico, CA	W 26–20	4,500	
October 4	Nevada	College Field; Chico, CA	W 22–18	4,800–5,100	
October 11	at Long Beach State*	Veterans Stadium; Long Beach, CA	L 8–28	2,300	
October 18	at Sacramento State	Grant Stadium; Sacramento, CA	L 6–14	3,500	
October 25	Cal Aggies	College Field; Chico, CA	W 8–6	6,500	
November 1	at Humboldt State	Redwood Bowl; Arcata, CA	L 0–18	6,100	
November 8	Naval Air Station Alameda (Note: Naval Air Station Alameda was a Naval Air Station from 1940 to 1997. For many years they fielded a team that played against colleges and other military teams.)*	College Field; Chico, CA	W 46–0	3,500	
November 14	at San Francisco State	Cox Stadium; San Francisco, CA	L 6–34	3,500	
November 22	Arizona State–Flagstaff	College Field; Chico, CA	L 6–40	3,000–3,800	
*Non-conference game
