= 1959 Sacramento State Hornets football team =

American college football season

1959 Sacramento State Hornets football
- Conference: Far Western Conference
- Record: 2–7 (1–4 FWC)
- Head coach: John W. Baker (3rd season)
- Home stadium: Charles C. Hughes Stadium

1959 Far Western Conference football standings
| | Conf. | | | | | Overall |
| Team | W | | L | | T | W | | L | | T |
|---|---|---|---|---|---|---|---|---|---|---|
| No. 17 San Francisco State $ | 5 | – | 0 | – | 0 | 10 | – | 0 | – | 0 |
| Humboldt State | 4 | – | 1 | – | 0 | 9 | – | 1 | – | 0 |
| Nevada | 3 | – | 2 | – | 0 | 4 | – | 3 | – | 0 |
| Chico State | 2 | – | 3 | – | 0 | 4 | – | 4 | – | 0 |
| Sacramento State | 1 | – | 4 | – | 0 | 2 | – | 7 | – | 0 |
| UC Davis | 0 | – | 5 | – | 0 | 1 | – | 8 | – | 0 |
$ – Conference champion; Rankings from UPI small college poll

The 1959 Sacramento State Hornets football team represented Sacramento State College—now known as California State University, Sacramento—as a member of the Far Western Conference (FWC) during the 1959 college football season. Led by third-year head coach John W. Baker, Sacramento State compiled an overall record of 2–7 with a mark of 1–4 in conference play, placing fifth in the FWC. For the season the team was outscored by its opponents 222 to 107. The Hornets played home games at Charles C. Hughes Stadium in Sacramento, California.

== Schedule ==
| Date | Opponent | Site | Result | Attendance | Source |
|---|---|---|---|---|---|
| September 19 | Los Angeles State* | Charles C. Hughes Stadium; Sacramento, CA | L 12–60 | | |
| September 26 | at Long Beach State* | Veterans Stadium; Long Beach, CA | L 0–19 | | |
| October 3 | at Whittier* | Hadley Field; Whittier, CA | L 19–20 | | |
| October 10 | at Humboldt State | Redwood Bowl; Arcata, CA | L 20–38 | | |
| October 17 | at Chico State | College Field; Chico, CA | L 2–28 | 7,000 | |
| October 24 | Nevada | Charles C. Hughes Stadium; Sacramento, CA | L 0–14 | 1,200 | |
| October 31 | Pomona* | Charles C. Hughes Stadium; Sacramento, CA | W 19–0 | | |
| November 7 | San Francisco State | Charles C. Hughes Stadium; Sacramento, CA | L 14–37 | 4,000 | |
| November 14 | at UC Davis | Toomey Field; Davis, CA (rivalry) | W 21–6 | | |
*Non-conference game
