= 1959 Chico State Wildcats football team =

American college football season

1959 Chico State Wildcats football
- Conference: Far Western Conference
- Record: 4–4 (2–3 FWC)
- Head coach: George Maderos (2nd season)
- Home stadium: College Field

1959 Far Western Conference football standings
	Conf.					Overall
Team	W		L		T	W		L		T
No. 17 San Francisco State $	5	–	0	–	0	10	–	0	–	0
Humboldt State	4	–	1	–	0	9	–	1	–	0
Nevada	3	–	2	–	0	4	–	3	–	0
Chico State	2	–	3	–	0	4	–	4	–	0
Sacramento State	1	–	4	–	0	2	–	7	–	0
UC Davis	0	–	5	–	0	1	–	8	–	0
$ – Conference champion; Rankings from UPI small college poll

The 1959 Chico State Wildcats football team represented Chico State College—now known as California State University, Chico—as a member of the Far Western Conference (FWC) during the 1959 college football season. Led by second-year head coach George Maderos, Chico State compiled an overall record of 4–4 with a mark of 2–3 in conference play, placing fourth in the FWC. The team outscored its opponents 186 to 116 for the season. The Wildcats played home games at College Field in Chico, California.

== Schedule ==
Date	Opponent	Site	Result	Attendance	Source
September 26	Southern Oregon*	College Field; Chico, CA	W 34–6	3,700	
October 3	at Nevada	Mackay Stadium (Note: This stadium is the predecessor to the current Mackay Stadium, which was opened for the 1966 season.); Reno, NV	L 8–27	3,000	
October 10	at Arizona State–Flagstaff*	Lumberjack Stadium; Flagstaff, AZ	L 12–26		
October 17	Sacramento State	College Field; Chico, CA	W 28–2	7,000	
October 24	La Verne*	College Field; Chico, CA	W 49–0	2,500	
October 31	Humboldt State	College Field; Chico, CA	L 12–13	3,000	
November 7	at UC Davis	Aggie Field; Davis, CA	W 30–10		
November 14	San Francisco State	College Field; Chico, CA	L 13–32	4,000–6,000	
*Non-conference game
