= 1958 Pacific Tigers football team =

American college football season

1958 Pacific Tigers football
- Conference: Independent
- Record: 6–4
- Head coach: Jack Myers (6th season)
- Home stadium: Pacific Memorial Stadium

1958 Western major college football independents records
	Conf.			Overall
Team	W	L	T	W		L		T
No. 6 Air Force		–		9	–	0	–	2
Pacific (CA)		–		6	–	4	–	0
San Jose State		–		4	–	5	–	0
Rankings from AP poll

The 1958 Pacific Tigers football team represented the College of the Pacific (COP)—now known as the University of the Pacific—as an independent during the 1958 college football season. Led by sixth-year head coach Jack Myers, the Tigers compiled a record of 6–4 and outscored opponents 266 to 178. The team played home games at Pacific Memorial Stadium in Stockton, California.

== Schedule ==
Date	Opponent	Site	Result	Attendance	Source
September 20	at California	California Memorial Stadium; Berkeley, CA	W 24–20	40,000	
September 27	Arizona State	Pacific Memorial Stadium; Stockton, CA	W 34–16	31,008	
October 11	BYU	Pacific Memorial Stadium; Stockton, CA	W 26–8	25,473	
October 18	Cincinnati	Pacific Memorial Stadium; Stockton, CA	L 6–12	28,642	
October 25	at Marquette	Milwaukee County Stadium; Milwaukee, WI	L 18–27	10,711	
November 1	at Boston College	Alumni Stadium; Chestnut Hill, MA	L 12–25	16,000	
November 8	San Jose State	Pacific Memorial Stadium; Stockton, CA (Victory Bell)	W 26–13	28,000	
November 15	Washington State	Pacific Memorial Stadium; Stockton, CA	L 0–34	21,500	
November 22	at San Diego State	Aztec Bowl; San Diego, CA	W 68–17	11,000	
November 27	at Fresno State	Ratcliffe Stadium; Fresno, CA	W 52–6	9,768–11,500	

== Team players in the NFL ==
The following College of the Pacific players were selected in the 1959 NFL draft.

Player	Position	Round	Overall	NFL team
Dick Bass	Fullback – Halfback	1	2	Los Angeles Rams
Bob Denton	Defensive end – Tackle	6	71	Cleveland Browns
Bob Coronado	Wide receiver	10	116	Chicago Bears
