= Bob Titchenal =

American football player and coach (1917–2009)

Biographical details
- Born: October 17, 1917; Ventura, California, U.S.
- Died: July 5, 2009 (aged 91); Santa Rosa, California, U.S.

Playing career
- 1937–1939: San Jose State
- 1940–1942: Washington Redskins
- 1943: Lakehurst NAS
- 1945: Saint Mary's Pre-Flight
- 1946: San Francisco 49ers
- 1947: Los Angeles Dons
- Positions: Center, end

Coaching career (HC unless noted)
- 1943: Lakehurst NAS (assistant)
- 1948–1949: West Virginia (line)
- 1950–1951: New Mexico (assistant)
- 1952: Denver (assistant)
- 1953–1955: New Mexico
- 1956: USC (freshman)
- 1957–1964: San Jose State

Head coaching record
- Overall: 45–61–2

Robert Alden "Titch" Titchenal (October 17, 1917 – July 5, 2009) was an American football player and coach. He played college football at San Jose State University from 1937 to 1939 and was captain of the school's undefeated 1939 team. He played professional football for five seasons as a center and end for the Washington Redskins (1940–1942), San Francisco 49ers (1946), and Los Angeles Dons (1947).

He coached football from 1948 to 1964, including stints as head coach at the University of New Mexico (1953–1955) and San Jose State (1957–1964).

== Early years ==
Titchenal was born in 1917 in Ventura, California, and attended Herbert Hoover High School in Glendale, California. He began his college career at Glendale Junior College and then enrolled at San Jose State University where he played center for the football team. He played on coach Dudley DeGroot's San Jose State teams compiled a 33-3-2 record from 1937 to 1939. The 1939 San Jose team compiled a 13-0 record and outscored opponents 324 to 29.

== Professional football and military service ==
Titchenal played professional football for the Washington Redskins as a center in 1940 and at end in 1941 and 1942. He helped the Redskins to a 9–2 in 1940 and a loss to the Chicago Bears in the 1940 NFL Championship Game. In 1942, he helped the Redskins to a 10–1 record and a victory over the Bears in the 1942 NFL Championship Game.

Titchenal joined the United States Navy after the 1942 season and was the captain and starting left end for the Lakehurst Naval Air Station football team in 1943. He also served as a swimming instructor for Navy recruits.

After the war, Titchenal returned to professional football as an end for the 1946 San Francisco 49ers team that compiled a 9–5 record in the inaugural season of the All-America Football Conference (AAFC).

In July 1947, Titchenal signed with the 1947 Los Angeles Dons of the All-America Football Conference. In Los Angeles, Titchenal was reunited with his college coach Dudley DeGroot who was by then head coach of the Dons. He appeared in 14 games, two as a starter, for the Dons.

In five seasons of professional football, Titchenal appeared in 60 games, 27 as a starter, and caught 15 passes for 264 yards and two touchdowns.

== Coaching career ==
After the 1947 season, Los Angeles coach DeGroot was hired as head coach of the West Virginia Mountaineers football team. Degroot hired Titchenall as an assistant coach at West Virginia. Titchenal served as an assistant coach at West Virginia for the 1948 and 1949 seasons.

In 1950, DeGroot left West Virginia to become head coach at the University of New Mexico. Titchenall followed as the team's backfield coach. He served in that position during the 1950 and 1951 seasons.

In March 1953, DeGroot left New Mexico for a position as assistant football coach and head swimming coach at the University of Denver.

In March 1953, Titchenal was hired as the head football coach at the University of New Mexico. From 1953 to 1955, he served as New Mexicos' head coach, compiling a 12–15–1 record. He was selected as the Skyline Conference Coach of the Year in 1953. He was fired in December 1955.

In July 1956, he returned to Los Angeles as the freshman football coach at the University of Southern California.

In November 1956, Titchenal was hired as the head football coach at San Jose State University. He held that position for eight seasons from 1957 to 1964, compiling a 33–46–1 record. During his time as head coach, his quarterbacks included Dick Vermeil in 1957 and Chon Gallegos in 1961. Bill Walsh was an assistant coach in 1957. Titchenal resigned as San Jose's football coach in January 1965 amid criticism from alumni and students over the team's record.

== Later years and family ==
After resigning as head football coach at San Jose State, Titchenal remained at the school as a physical education professor, teaching classes in diving, surfing, sailing and other subjects. He retired from the school in 1987 at age 69.

Titchenal and his wife, Barbara, had three sons: Gary, Alan, and Robert. He died in 2009 at age 91.

== Head coaching record ==
Year	Team	Overall	Conference	Standing	Bowl/playoffs
New Mexico Lobos (Skyline Conference) (1953–1955)
1953	New Mexico	5–3–1	3–2–1	4th	
1954	New Mexico	5–5	3–3	T–4th	
1955	New Mexico	2–8	1–5	7th	
New Mexico:		12–15–1	7–10–1		
San Jose State Spartans (NCAA University Division independent) (1957–1964)
1957	San Jose State	3–7			
1958	San Jose State	4–5			
1959	San Jose State	4–6			
1960	San Jose State	5–4			
1961	San Jose State	6–4			
1962	San Jose State	2–8–1			
1963	San Jose State	5–5			
1964	San Jose State	4–6			
San Jose State:		33–46–1			
Total:		45–61–2			
