= 1959 San Francisco State Gators football team =

American college football season

1959 San Francisco State Gators football

FWC champion
- Conference: Far Western Conference
- Record: 10–0 (5–0 FWC)
- Head coach: Joe Verducci (10th season)
- Home stadium: Cox Stadium

1959 Far Western Conference football standings
	Conf.					Overall
Team	W		L		T	W		L		T
No. 17 San Francisco State $	5	–	0	–	0	10	–	0	–	0
Humboldt State	4	–	1	–	0	9	–	1	–	0
Nevada	3	–	2	–	0	4	–	3	–	0
Chico State	2	–	3	–	0	4	–	4	–	0
Sacramento State	1	–	4	–	0	2	–	7	–	0
UC Davis	0	–	5	–	0	1	–	8	–	0
$ – Conference champion; Rankings from UPI small college poll

The 1959 San Francisco State Gators football team represented San Francisco State College—now known as San Francisco State University—as a member of the Far Western Conference (FWC) during the 1959 college football season. Led by tenth-year head coach Joe Verducci, San Francisco State compiled an overall record of 10–0 with a mark of 5–0 in conference play, winning the FWC title for the fourth consecutive season. For the season the team outscored its opponents 302 to 85. The Gators played home games at Cox Stadium in San Francisco.

== Schedule ==
Date	Opponent	Site	Result	Attendance	Source
September 12	at San Quentin State Prison*	San Quentin Prison (Note: This was the fifth annual game against San Quentin Prison. All of the games were held within the walls of the prison itself.); San Quentin, CA	W 20–16	3,000	
September 19	Humboldt State	Cox Stadium; San Francisco, CA	W 28–0	3,000	
September 26	Cal Poly Pomona*	Cox Stadium; San Francisco, CA	W 34–14	2,500	
October 3	at Long Beach State*	Veterans Stadium; Long Beach, CA	W 12–0	4,000	
October 10	at San Quentin Prison (Note: A game against Occidental had been scheduled for this date. However, several members of the Occidental team came down with food poisoning, so a second game against San Quentin Prison was scheduled.)*	San Quentin Prison; San Quentin, CA	W 35–0	4,000	
October 17	at Nevada	Mackay Stadium (Note: This stadium is the predecessor to the current Mackay Stadium, which was opened for the 1966 season.); Reno, NV	W 30–14	7,500	
October 24	UC Santa Barbara*	Cox Stadium; San Francisco, CA	W 28–14	3,500–4,000	
October 31	UC Davis	Cox Stadium; San Francisco, CA	W 46–0	4,500	
November 7	at Sacramento State	Charles C. Hughes Stadium; Sacramento, CA	W 37–14	4,000	
November 14	at Chico State	College Field; Chico, CA	W 32–13	4,000–6,000	
*Non-conference game
