= Bob Keyes =

American football player (1936–1978)

No. 24
- Position: Halfback

Personal information
- Born: April 13, 1936; Bakersfield, California, U.S.
- Died: July 8, 1978 (aged 42)
- Listed height: 5 ft 10 in (1.78 m)
- Listed weight: 183 lb (83 kg)

Career information
- College: San Diego
- NFL draft: 1959: undrafted

Career history
- San Francisco 49ers (1960)*; Oakland Raiders (1960); San Diego Chargers (1961)*
- * Offseason or practice squad member only
- Stats at Pro Football Reference

Robert Jerald Keyes (April 13, 1936 – July 8, 1978) was an American football player. Keyes played one season with the newly formed Oakland Raiders (1960).

Keyes played junior college football for Antelope Valley College, where he led the Southern California conference in touchdowns in 1956 with 16 scores. He later played college football for the University of San Diego, then played for Marine Corps Recruit Depot San Diego in 1959. He signed with the San Francisco 49ers on June 16, 1960, but was released before the start of the regular season on September 13. He signed with the Oakland Raiders on September 22, and played in four games for the team in 1960. Keyes signed with the San Diego Chargers on March 24, 1961.
