= 1958 Cal Aggies football team =

American college football season

1958 Cal Aggies football
- Conference: Far Western Conference
- Record: 5–4 (3–2 FWC)
- Head coach: Herb Schmalenberger (1st season)
- Captain: Mel Voos
- Home stadium: Aggie Field

1958 Far Western Conference football standings
	Conf.					Overall
Team	W		L		T	W		L		T
San Francisco State $	4	–	1	–	0	7	–	3	–	0
Humboldt State	3	–	2	–	0	7	–	2	–	1
Cal Aggies	3	–	2	–	0	5	–	4	–	0
Chico State	2	–	3	–	0	5	–	5	–	0
Nevada	2	–	3	–	0	3	–	3	–	0
Sacramento State	1	–	4	–	0	3	–	6	–	0
$ – Conference champion

The 1958 Cal Aggies football team represented the College of Agriculture at Davis—now known as the University of California, Davis—as a member of the Far Western Conference (FWC) during the 1958 college football season. Led by first-year head coach Herb Schmalenberger, the Aggies compiled an overall record of 5–4 with a mark of 3–2 in conference play, tying for second place in the FWC. The team outscored its opponents 106 to 100 for the season. The Cal Aggies played home games at Aggie Field in Davis, California.

== Schedule ==
Date	Time	Opponent	Site	Result	Attendance	Source
September 20		Whittier*	Aggie Field; Davis, CA	L 6–9		
September 27		Willamette (OR)*	Aggie Field; Davis, CA	L 0–20		
October 4		at Occidental*	D.W. Patterson Field; Los Angeles, CA	W 12–6		
October 10		Nevada	Aggie Field; Davis, CA	W 14–2	1,900	
October 18		Humboldt State	Aggie Field; Davis, CA	W 18–6	3,000	
October 25		at Chico State	College Field; Chico, CA	L 6–8	6,500	
October 31		San Francisco State	Aggie Field; Davis, CA	L 14–27	3,000	
November 8		vs. UC Santa Barbara (Note: The game against UC Santa Barbara was part of an "All-UC Doubleheader" that was held annually from 1948 to 1963. The other game of the double-header was California vs. UCLA. The games were always held at the home stadium of either Cal or UCLA.)*	California Memorial Stadium; Berkeley, CA	W 14–8	50,050	
November 15	8:00 p.m.	at Sacramento State	Grant Stadium; Sacramento, CA (rivalry)	W 22–14		
*Non-conference game; All times are in Pacific time
