= 1958 Cal Poly Pomona Broncos football team =

American college football season

1958 Cal Poly Pomona Broncos football
- Conference: Independent
- Record: 7–3
- Head coach: Don Warhurst (2nd season)
- Captain: Pomona Catholic High School

1958 Western non-major college football independents records
	Conf.			Overall
Team	W	L	T	W		L		T
No. 6 Montana State		–		8	–	1	–	0
Cal Poly Pomona		–		7	–	3	–	0
UC Riverside		–		2	–	3	–	2
Hawaii		–		5	–	7	–	0
Pepperdine		–		1	–	7	–	0
Rankings from UPI small college poll

The 1958 Cal Poly Pomona Broncos football team represented the Cal Poly Kellogg-Voorhis Unit—now known as California State Polytechnic University, Pomona—as an independent during the 1958 college football season. Led by second-year head coach Don Warhurst, Cal Poly Pomona compiled a record of 7–3. The team outscored its opponents 275 to 150 for the season. The Broncos played home games in Pomona Catholic High School in Pomona, California.

== Schedule ==
Date	Time	Opponent	Site	Result	Attendance	Source
September 20		vs. Arizona State–Flagstaff	Brawley, CA	L 8–16		
September 26		at San Francisco State	Cox Stadium; San Francisco, CA	L 18–20		
October 4		San Diego Marines (Note: The Marine Corps Recruit Depot (MCRD) in San Diego fielded a team that played against colleges and other military teams from 1922 to 1964.)	?	L 6–12		
October 11	2:15 p.m.	at Pomona	Alumni Field; Claremont, CA	W 41–12		
October 17		at Occidental	D. W. Patterson Field; Los Angeles, CA	W 32–20		
October 25		at Pepperdine	El Camino Stadium; Torrance, CA	W 35–22		
November 1		at University of Mexico	Estadio Olímpico Universitario; Mexico City, Mexico	W 29–14	35,000	
November 8		at Mexico Poly	Estadio Wilfrido Massieu; Mexico City, Mexico	W 35–14	40,000	
November 15	8:00 p.m.	Redlands	Pomona Catholic High School; Pomona, CA	W 35–20	1,600	
November 22	2:00 p.m.	La Verne	Pomona Catholic High School; Pomona, CA	W 36–0	5,000	
