= California Collegiate Athletic Association =

U.S. athletic conference

- Association: NCAA
- Founded: 1938; 88 years ago
- Commissioner: Allen Hardison
- Sports fielded: 13; men's: 6; women's: 7
- Division: Division II
- No. of teams: 14 (15 in 2027)
- Headquarters: Aliso Viejo, California
- Region: California
- Website: goccaa.org

Locations

The California Collegiate Athletic Association (CCAA) is a college athletic conference affiliated with the National Collegiate Athletic Association (NCAA) at the Division II level.

It was founded in December 1938 and began competition in 1939. The commissioner of the CCAA is Allen Hardison. CCAA offices are located in Aliso Viejo, California. The CCAA is the most successful conference in NCAA Division II, as its former and current members have won 155 National Championships.

== History ==
Location of CCAA members:
– Full member
– Future member

=== Recent events ===
On November 14, 2023, the University of California, Merced had accepted an invitation to join the CCAA, beginning the 2025–26 academic year.

On January 22, 2025, Sonoma State University announced that it would be ceasing all athletic operations following the conclusion of the 2024–25 athletic year. However, on July 27, 2026, university officials announced that the athletics department would be reinstated and would return to the CCAA in the 2027–28 academic year.

On June 13, 2025, Fresno Pacific University received an invitation to join the CCAA, beginning the 2026–27 academic year.

In addition to Fresno Pacific University joining the CCAA, Menlo College announced that they will be joining the conference, and starting sports in the fall of 2026.

=== Chronological timeline ===
- 1938 – The California Collegiate Athletic Association (CCAA) was founded. Charter members included Fresno State Normal School (now California State University, Fresno or Fresno State University), San Diego State College (now San Diego State University), San Jose State College (now San Jose State University) and Santa Barbara State College (now the University of California, Santa Barbara), beginning the 1939–40 academic year.
- 1945 – George Pepperdine College (now Pepperdine University) and California State Polytechnic College (now California Polytechnic State University, San Luis Obispo) joined the CCAA in the 1945–46 academic year.
- 1946 – The College of the Pacific (now the University of the Pacific) joined the CCAA in the 1946–47 academic year.
- 1949:
  - Pacific (Cal.) left the CCAA to join the University Division ranks of the National Collegiate Athletic Association (NCAA) as an NCAA Independent after the 1948–49 academic year.
  - San Jose State left the CCAA to join the NCAA University Division ranks as an NCAA Independent after the 1949–50 academic year.
- 1950 – The Los Angeles State College of Applied Arts and Sciences (now California State University, Los Angeles) joined the CCAA in the 1950–51 academic year.
- 1954 – Pepperdine left the CCAA to join the NCAA University I ranks as an NCAA Independent after the 1953–54 academic year.
- 1956 – Long Beach State College (now California State University, Long Beach) joined the CCAA in the 1956–57 academic year.
- 1961 – San Fernando Valley State College (now California State University, Northridge) joined the CCAA in the 1961–62 academic year.
- 1964 – UC Santa Barbara left the CCAA to play football as an independent, and play alongside primarily private schools in other sports, joining the West Coast Athletic Conference (WCAC; now known as the West Coast Conference) after the 1963–64 school year.
- 1967 – California State College at Fullerton (now California State University, Fullerton) and California State Polytechnic College, Kellogg-Voorhis (now California State Polytechnic University, Pomona) joined the CCAA in the 1967–68 academic year.
- 1969:
  - Cal State–Los Angeles, Fresno State, Long Beach State, and San Diego State left the CCAA to join the NCAA University Division ranks and form the Pacific Collegiate Athletic Association (PCAA; now known as the Big West Conference) after the 1968–69 academic year.
  - The University of California, Riverside joined the CCAA in the 1969–70 academic year.
- 1972 – California State College, Bakersfield (now California State University, Bakersfield) joined the CCAA in the 1972–73 academic year.
- 1974:
  - Cal State–Fullerton left the CCAA to join the PCAA after the 1973–74 academic year.
  - Cal State–Los Angeles rejoined the CCAA in the 1974–75 academic year.
- 1978 – Chapman College (now Chapman University) joined the CCAA in the 1978–79 academic year.
- 1980 – California State University, Dominguez Hills joined the CCAA in the 1980–81 academic year.
- 1990 – Cal State–Northridge left the CCAA to join the NCAA Division I ranks as an NCAA D-I Independent (who would later join the American West Conference, beginning the 1994–95 school year) after the 1989–90 academic year.
- 1991 – California State University, San Bernardino joined the CCAA in the 1991–92 academic year.
- 1993 – Chapman left the CCAA to join the NCAA Division III ranks as an NCAA D-III Independent after the 1992–93 academic year.
- 1994:
  - Cal Poly–San Luis Obispo left the CCAA to join the NCAA Division I ranks and the American West after the 1993–94 academic year.
  - Grand Canyon University joined the CCAA in the 1994–95 academic year.
- 1998 – California State University, Chico (Chico State), California State University, Stanislaus (Stanislaus State), San Francisco State University, Sonoma State University and the University of California, Davis (UC Davis) joined the CCAA in the 1998–99 academic year.
- 2000:
  - UC Riverside left the CCAA to become an NCAA D-II Independent (who would later join the NCAA Division I ranks and the Big West Conference, beginning the 2001–02 school year.) after the 1999–2000 academic year.
  - The University of California, San Diego (UC San Diego) joined the CCAA in the 2000–01 academic year.
- 2004:
  - Two institutions left the CCAA to join their respective new home primary conferences, both effective after the 2003–04 academic year:
    - Grand Canyon as an NCAA D-II Independent (who would later join the Pacific West Conference (PacWest), beginning the 2005–06 school year)
    - and UC Davis to join the NCAA Division I ranks as an NCAA D-I Independent (who would later join the Big West, beginning the 2007–08 school year)
  - California State University, Monterey Bay joined the CCAA in the 2004–05 academic year.
- 2006 – Humboldt State University (now California State Polytechnic University, Humboldt) joined the CCAA in the 2006–07 academic year.
- 2007 – Cal State–Bakersfield left the CCAA to join the NCAA Division I ranks as an NCAA D-I Independent (who would later join the Western Athletic Conference (WAC), beginning the 2013–14 school year) after the 2006–07 academic year.
- 2009 – California State University, East Bay (formerly California State University, Hayward) joined the CCAA in the 2009–10 academic year.
- 2015 – California State University, San Marcos joined the CCAA in the 2015–16 academic year.
- 2020 – UC San Diego left the CCAA to join the NCAA Division I ranks and the Big West after the 2019–20 academic year.
- 2025:
  - Sonoma State left the CCAA after the 2024–25 academic year; as the school announced that it had ceased all athletic programs.
  - The University of California, Merced (UC Merced) joined the CCAA in the 2025–26 academic year
- 2026 – Fresno Pacific University and Menlo College joined the CCAA, beginning the 2026–27 academic year. They became the first private non-UCal or non-Cal State schools to join the conference since Grand Canyon (who was a full member from fall 1994 to spring 2004).
- 2027 – Sonoma State will reinstate its athletic programs and rejoin the CCAA, beginning the 2027–28 academic year.

== Member schools ==
=== Current members ===
As of 2026, the CCAA has 14 full members, all but two of which are public schools.

Institution	Athletic brand	Location (Note: All cities are located within the State of California.)	Founded	Affiliation	Enrollment (Fall 2024)	Nickname	Joined (Note: Represents the calendar year when fall sports competition begins.)	Colors
California State Polytechnic University, Humboldt	Cal Poly Humboldt	Arcata	1913	Public (Note: Part of the California State University System.)	6,045	Lumberjacks	2006	
California State Polytechnic University, Pomona	Cal Poly Pomona	Pomona	1938	Public	27,196	Broncos	1967	
California State University, Chico	Chico State	Chico	1887	Public	14,581	Wildcats	1998	
California State University, Dominguez Hills	Cal State Dominguez Hills	Carson	1960	Public	14,262	Toros	1980	
California State University, East Bay	Cal State East Bay	Hayward	1957	Public	10,892	Pioneers	2009	
California State University, Los Angeles	Cal State Los Angeles	Los Angeles	1947	Public	22,740	Golden Eagles	1950; 1974 (Note: Cal State LA left the CCAA after the 1968–69 school year to join the Pacific Coast Athletic Association (PCAA; now known as the Big West Conference), but rejoined in the 1974–75 school year.)	
California State University, Monterey Bay	Cal State Monterey Bay	Seaside	1994	Public	7,302	Otters	2004	
California State University, San Bernardino	Cal State San Bernardino or CSUSB	San Bernardino	1965	Public	17,900	Coyotes	1991	
California State University, San Marcos	Cal State San Marcos	San Marcos	1989	Public	14,655	Cougars	2015	
California State University, Stanislaus	Stanislaus State	Turlock	1957	Public	9,295	Warriors	1998	
San Francisco State University	San Francisco State	San Francisco	1899	Public	22,357	Gators	1998	
Fresno Pacific University	Fresno Pacific	Fresno	1944	Mennonite	2,889	Sunbirds	2026	
Menlo College	Menlo	Atherton	1927	Nonsectarian	810	Oaks	2026	
University of California, Merced	UC Merced	Merced	2005	Public (Note: Part of the University of California System.)	9,110	Bobcats	2025	

=== Future members ===
The CCAA will have one new full member, a public school:

Institution	Athletic brand	Location (Note: All cities are located within the State of California, unless noted in parentheses the state where the institution is located by that city.)	Founded	Affiliation	Enrollment	Nickname	Joining (Note: Represents the calendar year when fall sports competition begins.)	Colors	Current conference
Sonoma State University	Sonoma State	Rohnert Park	1960	Public (Note: Part of the California State University System.)	6,566	Seawolves	2027 (Note: Sonoma State was previously a full member of the CCAA from 1998–99 to 2024–25.)		—N/a (Note: Sonoma State dropped its athletics program after the 2024–25 school year, but will reinstate it beginning in 2027–28.)

=== Former members ===
The CCAA had 17 former full members, all but four were public schools. Institutional names and nicknames reflect those used in the final academic year of CCAA membership:

Institution	Athletic brand	Location (Note: All cities are located within the State of California, unless noted in parentheses the state where the institution is located by that city.)	Founded	Affiliation	Enrollment	Nickname	Joined (Note: Represents the calendar year when fall sports competition begins.)	Left (Note: Represents the calendar year when spring sports competition ends.)	Current conference
California Polytechnic State University	Cal Poly San Luis Obispo or Cal Poly	San Luis Obispo	1901	Public (Note: Part of the California State University System.)	21,306	Mustangs	1945	1994	Big West (BWC) (Note: Currently an NCAA Division I athletic conference.)
California State University, Bakersfield	Cal State Bakersfield	Bakersfield	1965	Public	8,720	Roadrunners	1972	2007	Big West (BWC)
California State University, Fresno	Fresno State	Fresno	1911	Public	25,341	Bulldogs	1939	1969	Pac-12
California State University, Fullerton	Cal State Fullerton	Fullerton	1957	Public	40,235	Titans	1967	1974	Big West (BWC)
California State University, Long Beach	Cal State Long Beach or Long Beach State	Long Beach	1949	Public	37,776	49ers (Note: Long Beach State fully rebranded its athletic program as "The Beach" since the 2020–21 school year.)	1956	1969	Big West (BWC)
California State University, Northridge	Cal State Northridge	Northridge	1958	Public	39,916	Matadors	1961	1990	Big West (BWC)
University of California, Davis	UC Davis	Davis	1905	Public (Note: Part of the University of California System.)	36,441	Aggies	1998	2004	Mountain West (MW)
University of California, Riverside	UC Riverside	Riverside	1954	Public	22,921	Highlanders	1969	2000	Big West (BWC)
University of California, San Diego	UC San Diego or UCSD	La Jolla	1960	Public	33,735	Tritons	2000	2020	Big West (BWC) (Note: UC San Diego and UC Santa Barbara will join the West Coast Conference in July 2027.)
University of California, Santa Barbara	UC Santa Barbara or UCSB	Santa Barbara (Note: Mailing address; the campus is in the adjacent community of Isla Vista.)	1891	Public	24,346	Gauchos	1939	1964	Big West (BWC)
Chapman University	Chapman	Orange	1861	Disciples of Christ	10,001	Panthers	1978	1993	Southern California (SCIAC) (Note: Currently an NCAA Division III athletic conference.)
Grand Canyon University	Grand Canyon	Phoenix (Arizona)	1949	Nondenominational/ For-profit (Note: Grand Canyon's for-profit status is disputed. The U.S. Department of Education considers it to be for-profit, but the Internal Revenue Service, the state of Arizona, and the NCAA all consider it a nonprofit.)	25,000	Antelopes	1994	2004	Mountain West (MW)
University of the Pacific	Pacific	Stockton	1851	United Methodist	6,652	Tigers	1946	1949	West Coast (WCC)
Pepperdine University	Pepperdine	Malibu (Note: Mailing address; the campus is in unincorporated Los Angeles County.)	1937	Churches of Christ	6,000	Waves	1945	1954	West Coast (WCC)
San Diego State University	Cal State San Diego or San Diego State	San Diego	1897	Public	35,578	Aztecs	1939	1969	Pac-12
San Jose State University	Cal State San Jose or San Jose State	San Jose	1857	Public	33,025	Spartans	1939	1950	Mountain West (MW)
Sonoma State University	Sonoma State	Rohnert Park	1960	Public	6,566	Seawolves	1998	2025	N/A (Note: Sonoma State dropped its athletics program after the 2024–25 school year, but will reinstate it and rejoin the CCAA beginning in 2027–28.)

=== Membership timeline ===
Full member (all sports) Full member (non-football) Associate member (football) Associate member (sport)

== Sports sponsored ==
The CCAA sponsors seven sports for women and six sports for men. Cross country, soccer, and volleyball are fall sports; basketball is a winter sport; golf, outdoor track & field, softball, and baseball are spring sports. Throughout the years, CCAA teams have won 155 NCAA championships in their sports, which is best among all Division II conferences.

The CCAA has a Student-Athlete Advisory Committee, which is made up of student-athletes from each member institution.

The following divisional format is used for baseball, men's and women's basketball, and women's volleyball.
North
- Cal Poly Humboldt
- Chico State
- Cal State East Bay
- Stanislaus State
- San Francisco State
- UC Merced
South
- Cal Poly Pomona
- Cal State Dominguez Hills
- Cal State Los Angeles
- Cal State Monterey Bay
- Cal State San Bernardino
- Cal State San Marcos

Teams in California Collegiate Athletic Association competition
Sport	Men's	Women's
Baseball	11	–
Basketball	14	14
Cross country	10	12
Golf	9	6
Soccer	13	14
Softball	–	10
Track & Field Outdoor	9	13
Volleyball	–	14

=== Men's sponsored sports by school ===
School	Baseball	Basketball	Cross Country	Golf	Soccer	Track & Field Outdoor	Total CCAA Sports
Cal Poly Humboldt	No	Yes	Yes	No	Yes	Yes	4
Cal Poly Pomona	Yes	Yes	Yes	No	Yes	Yes	5
Cal State Dominguez Hills	Yes	Yes	No	Yes	Yes	No	4
Cal State East Bay	Yes	Yes	Yes	Yes	Yes	Yes	6
Cal State Los Angeles	Yes	Yes	Yes	No	Yes	Yes	5
Cal State Monterey Bay	Yes	Yes	Yes	Yes	Yes	No	5
Cal State San Bernardino	Yes	Yes	No	Yes	Yes	No	4
Cal State San Marcos	Yes	Yes	Yes	Yes	Yes	Yes	6
Chico State	Yes	Yes	Yes	Yes	Yes	Yes	6
Fresno Pacific	Yes	Yes	Yes	No	Yes	Yes	5
Menlo	Yes	Yes	No	Yes	Yes	No	4
San Francisco State	No	Yes	Yes	No	No	Yes	3
Stanislaus State	Yes	Yes	Yes	Yes	Yes	Yes	6
UC Merced	No	Yes	No	Yes	Yes	Yes	4
Totals	11	14	10	9	13	9	66
Future members
Sonoma State	No	Yes	Yes	Yes	Yes	No	4

Men's varsity sports not sponsored by the California Collegiate Athletic Association which are played by CCAA schools:

School	Swimming & Diving	Tennis	Track & Field Indoor	Volleyball (Note: Effective Division I sport; the NCAA's top-level championship is open to members of Divisions I and II.)	Water Polo (Note: Effective Division I sport; the NCAA men's championships are open to members of all three NCAA divisions.)	Wrestling
Cal Poly Humboldt						MPSF
Cal State Los Angeles			IND			
Fresno Pacific	PCSC	PacWest			WWPA	
Menlo		PacWest		MPSF		MPSF
San Francisco State						MPSF
UC Merced				MPSF	WWPA	

=== Women's sponsored sports by school ===
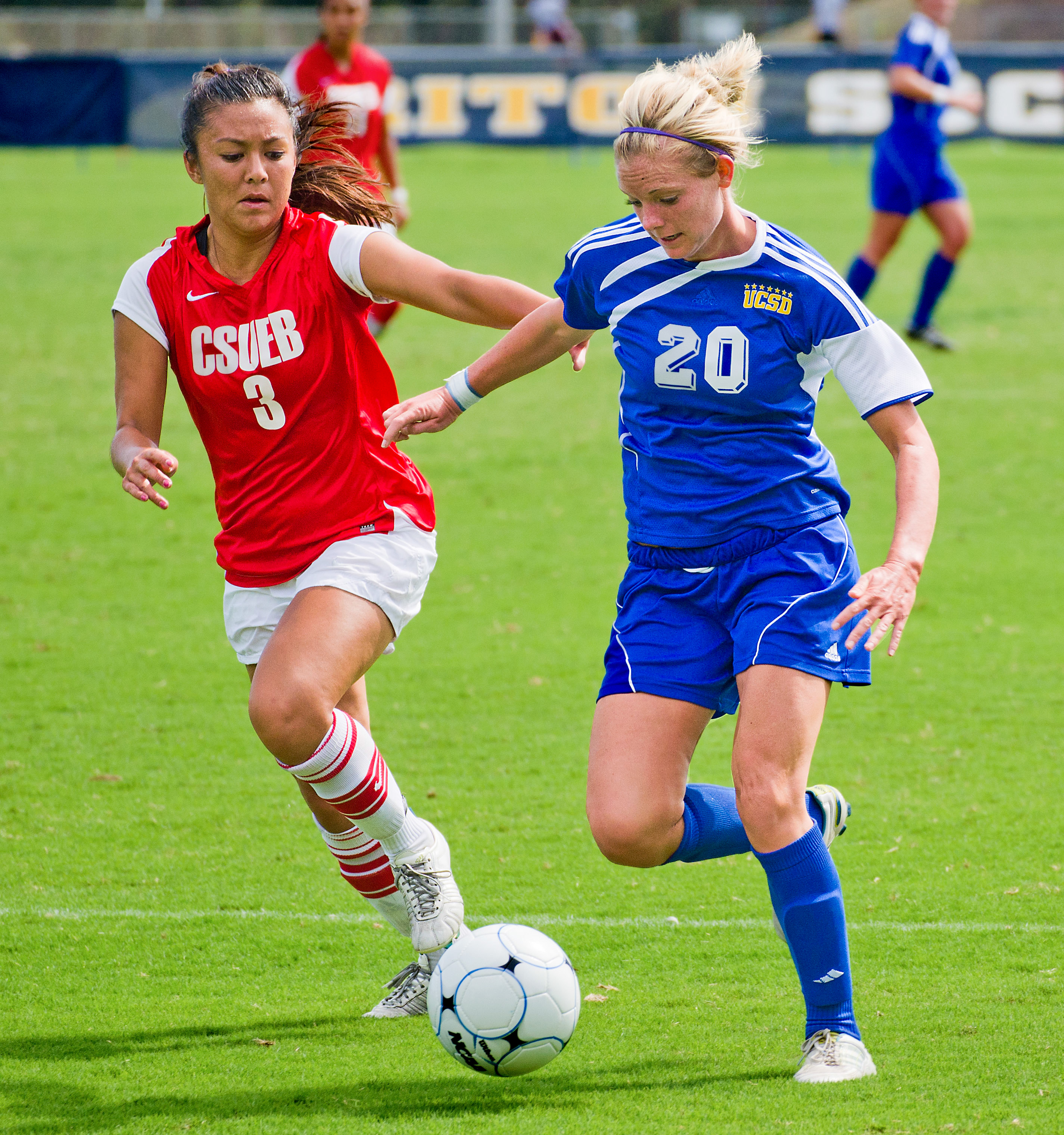
A CSUEB soccer player marking a University of California, San Diego attacker

School	Basketball	Cross Country	Golf	Soccer	Softball	Track & Field Outdoor	Volleyball	Total CCAA Sports
Cal Poly Humboldt	Yes	Yes	No	Yes	Yes	Yes	Yes	6
Cal Poly Pomona	Yes	Yes	No	Yes	No	Yes	Yes	5
Cal State Dominguez Hills	Yes	No	No	Yes	Yes	Yes	Yes	5
Cal State East Bay	Yes	Yes	Yes	Yes	Yes	Yes	Yes	7
Cal State Los Angeles	Yes	Yes	Yes	Yes	No	Yes	Yes	6
Cal State Monterey Bay	Yes	Yes	Yes	Yes	Yes	Yes	Yes	7
Cal State San Bernardino	Yes	Yes	No	Yes	Yes	Yes	Yes	6
Cal State San Marcos	Yes	Yes	Yes	Yes	Yes	Yes	Yes	7
Chico State	Yes	Yes	Yes	Yes	Yes	Yes	Yes	7
Fresno Pacific	Yes	Yes	No	Yes	No	Yes	Yes	5
Menlo	Yes	No	Yes	Yes	Yes	No	Yes	5
San Francisco State	Yes	Yes	No	Yes	Yes	Yes	Yes	6
Stanislaus State	Yes	Yes	No	Yes	Yes	Yes	Yes	6
UC Merced	Yes	Yes	No	Yes	No	Yes	Yes	5
Totals	14	12	6	14	10	13	14	83
Future members
Sonoma State	Yes	Yes	Yes	Yes	Yes	No	Yes	6

Women's varsity sports not sponsored by the California Collegiate Athletic Association which are played by CCAA schools:

School	Beach Volleyball (Note: Effective Division I sport; the NCAA championship is open to members of all three NCAA divisions.)	Rowing	Swimming & Diving	Tennis	Track & Field Indoor	Water Polo (Note: Effective Division I sport; the NCAA women's championships are open to members of all three NCAA divisions.)	Wrestling (Note: Effective Division I sport. The NCAA championship is open to members of all three NCAA divisions through the 2026–27 school year. After that, a separate Division III championship will be established, with members of Divisions I and II continuing to compete for a single team championship.)
Cal Poly Humboldt		GNAC					
Cal State Dominguez Hills					IND		
Cal State East Bay			PCSC			WWPA	
Cal State Los Angeles	IND			PacWest	IND		
Cal State Monterey Bay						WWPA	
Fresno Pacific			PCSC	PacWest		WWPA	
Menlo				PacWest			MPSF
Stanislaus State				PacWest	IND		
UC Merced						WWPA	

== CCAA championships ==
Locations of CCAA members, 2009–2015

School	CCAA championships (thru 6/2014)
Cal Poly Pomona	58
Chico State	52
Cal State Los Angeles	34
Cal State Dominguez Hills	31
Cal State San Bernardino	24
Sonoma State	14
Cal Poly Humboldt	11
Stanislaus State	9
Cal State Monterey Bay	9
San Francisco State	1
Cal State East Bay	0
Cal State San Marcos	0

=== Football ===
Season	Champion	Record
1939	San Jose State	3–0
1940	San Jose State	3–0
1941	Fresno State; San Jose State	2–0–1
1942	Conference suspended	—
1943	Conference suspended	—
1944	Conference suspended	—
1945	Conference suspended	—
1946	San Jose State	4–0
1947	Pacific (CA)	5–0
1948	San Jose State	5–0
1949	San Jose State	4–0
1950	San Diego State	3–0–1
1951	San Diego State	4–0
1952	Cal Poly San Luis Obispo	4–0

Season	Champion	Record
1953	Cal Poly San Luis Obispo	5–0
1954	Fresno State	4–0
1955	Fresno State	2–0
1956	No champion	—
1957	Cal Poly (unofficial)	3–0
1958	Cal Poly; Fresno State	4–1
1959	Fresno State	5–0
1960	Fresno State	5–0
1961	Fresno State	5–0
1962	San Diego State	5–0
1963	San Diego State	4–1
1964	Cal State Los Angeles	5–0
1965	Cal State Los Angeles	5–0
1966	San Diego State	5–0
1967	San Diego State	5–0

Season	Champion	Record
1968	Fresno State	4–0
1969	Cal Poly San Luis Obispo	2–0
1970	Cal Poly San Luis Obispo	3–0
1971	Cal Poly San Luis Obispo	3–0
1972	Cal Poly San Luis Obispo; UC Riverside	3–0
1973	Cal Poly San Luis Obispo	4–0
1974	UC Riverside	4–0
1975	UC Riverside	4–0
1976	Cal Poly San Luis Obispo	2–0
1977	Cal Poly San Luis Obispo	2–0
1978	Cal Poly San Luis Obispo	2–0
1979	Cal Poly San Luis Obispo	2–0
1980	Cal Poly San Luis Obispo	2–0
1981	Cal State Northridge	2–0

== NCAA championships ==
School	Team			Individual			Appearances			
School	Men	Women	Total	Men	Women	Total	Men	Women	Co–ed	Total
Cal Poly Pomona	5	7	12	10	15	25	87	75	0	162
Cal State Dominguez Hills	1	2	3	0	1	1	26	46	0	72
Cal State East Bay	1	1	2	16	6	22	41	28	0	69
Cal State Los Angeles	4	0	4	34	37	71	77	79	0	156
Cal State Monterey Bay	1	0	1	0	0	0	9	11	0	20
Cal State San Bernardino	0	1	1	1	0	1	25	29	0	54
Cal State San Marcos	0	0	0	0	0	0	0	2	0	2
Chico State	6	0	6	52	7	59	131	85	0	216
Humboldt State	1	4	5	10	8	18	55	58	0	113
San Francisco State	1	0	1	15	4	19	70	39	0	109
Sonoma State	2	1	3	0	0	0	42	63	0	105
Stanislaus State	0	0	0	4	7	11	51	47	0	98

== Conference facilities ==
School	Baseball Stadium	Capacity	Basketball Arena	Capacity	Soccer/ Track & Field Stadium	Capacity
Cal Poly Humboldt	non-baseball school		Lumberjack Arena	2,000	Redwood Bowl & College Creek Field	7,000; N/A
Cal Poly Pomona	Scolinos Field	1,000	Kellogg Arena	3,000	Kellogg Field	2,000
Chico State	Nettleton Stadium	4,200	Acker Gymnasium	1,997	University Soccer Stadium & Chico State Stadium	3,800; 6,000
Cal State Dominguez Hills	Toro Field	500	Torodome / Dave Yanai Court	3,602	Toro Stadium	3,000
Cal State East Bay	Pioneer Field		CSUEB Physical Education Complex	3,500	Pioneer Stadium	5,000
Cal State LA	Reeder Field	500	Eagle's Nest Arena	3,400	Jesse Owens Track	5,000
Cal State Monterey Bay	CSUMB Baseball/Softball Complex		The Kelp Bed	1,000	CSUMB Soccer Complex	660
Cal State San Bernardino	Fiscalini Field & San Manuel Stadium	2,000	Coussoulis Arena	4,140	Coyote Premier Field	300
Cal State San Marcos	CSUSM Baseball Field	1,000	The Sports Center	1,400	Mangrum Track & Soccer Field	
Stanislaus State	Warrior Baseball Field	1,500	Ed & Bertha Fitzpatrick Arena	2,000	Warrior Stadium & Al Brenda Track	2,000
San Francisco State	Maloney Field	100	Main Gym at Don Nasser Family Plaza	2,000	Cox Stadium	5,000
UC Merced	non-baseball school		Hostetler Court	600	Bobcat Field (Note: Bobcat Field is used for soccer only. UC Merced has no on-campus track and field venue.)	—N/a

== See also ==
- Big West Conference, a Division I conference that consists predominantly of California schools. Of its 12 current members, eight (Cal Baptist, Sacramento State, UC Irvine, and Utah Valley being the exceptions) are former members of the CCAA.
- California Pacific Conference, an NAIA conference that consisted entirely of California schools from its formation in 1996 until 2012.
- Great Southwest Athletic Conference, an NAIA conference that consisted entirely of California schools from its formation in 1986 until 2012.
