= Joseph Rogers (American football) =

American football player and coach (1924–2011)

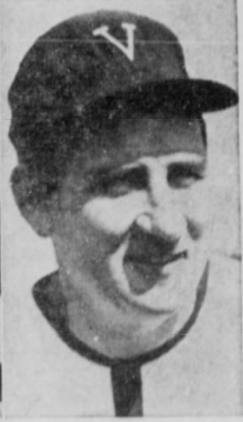

Biographical details
- Born: September 30, 1924; Philadelphia, Pennsylvania, U.S.
- Died: April 1, 2011 (aged 86); Bala Cynwyd, Pennsylvania, U.S.
- Education: Villanova University (1950)

Playing career
- 1946–1949: Villanova
- Position: Halfback

Coaching career (HC unless noted)
- 1950–1951: Waldron Academy (PA)
- 1952–1955: Villanova (freshmen)
- 1956–1959: Villanova (backfield)
- 1959: Villanova (interim HC)
- 1960–1966: Villanova (backfield)

Administrative career (AD unless noted)
- 1950–1952: Waldron Academy (PA)

Head coaching record
- Overall: 1–5 (college)

Joseph Patrick Rogers Sr. (September 30, 1924 – April 1, 2011) was an American football player and coach. He served as the interim head football coach at Villanova University for the final six games of the 1959 season, compiling a record of 1–5, including the team's only win of the season.

== Early life ==
Rogers was named all-scholastic athlete for both football and basketball at Roman Catholic High School in Philadelphia. He played under Jordan Olivar, who served as a mentor to Rogers for much of his professional career.

== College career ==
After serving in the United States Coast Guard from 1943 to 1945, Rogers entered Villanova University as a freshman in 1946, where he played halfback for the Wildcats. Rogers led the Wildcats in both scoring and rushing in 1946 with seven touchdowns for 42 points and 90 carries for 620 yards. As a freshman, he averaged 6.9 yards per carry which ranked 12th nationally.

During Rogers' four-year playing career, Villanova tallied a 28–10 record and played in two bowl games, the 1947 Great Lakes Bowl, in which Rogers served as captain in a 24–14 win over Kentucky, and the 1949 Harbor Bowl, a 27–7 loss to Nevada.

Rogers was inducted into the Villanova Varsity Club Hall of Fame in 1979.

== Coaching career ==
=== Waldron Academy ===
Rogers served as the athletic director and head football coach at Waldron Academy, in Merion, Pennsylvania, from 1950 to 1952.

=== Villanova ===
Rogers was the freshman coach from 1952 to 1955. In addition to coaching, Rogers was largely responsible for all scouting duties associated with the team. He had tremendous success with Villanova's freshman eleven. In August 1955, Rogers was promoted to varsity backfield coach after the job was vacated by Bob Snyder, who had accepted an assistant coaching position with the Pittsburgh Steelers.

In October 1959, Villanova head coach, Frank Reagan, stepped down and appointed Rogers, his first assistant, to serve as interim head coach for the remainder of the season. That year, Rogers coached Villanova to its only victory of the season. Rogers was offered the permanent head coaching position in 1960, but turned down the offer. He also turned down several other coaching offers, including one in Canada, to remain at Villanova as coordinator of alumni programs. He also worked as a scout for the Green Bay Packers during this time. Reagan convinced Rogers to return to Villanova as varsity backfield coach in 1961.

=== Professional teams ===
In 1966, Rogers resigned from his Villanova position to accept a backfield coaching position for the Atlantic City Senators in the Atlantic Coast Football League (ACFL). He coached many household names here, including: Tom Urbanik, former Penn State fullback; Glynn Griffing, former reserve quarterback of the New York Giants, and Mark Lichtenfeld, formerly of Temple University.

Rogers then went on to work as defensive coach for the Philadelphia Bulldogs of the Continental Football League under the direction of Wayne Hardin.

After a stint as defensive coach for the Pottstown Firebirds, Rogers was promoted to defensive coordinator in March 1969. Firebirds head coach, Dave DiFilippo, credited Rogers with the team's successful 1968 season and called Rogers "the best defensive coach in the ACFL." In 1969, the Firebirds won the ACFL championship, 31–0, over the Hartford Knights.

Rogers permanently retired from full-time coaching in 1970, citing frequent travel as the main reason. Rogers noted his desire to spend more time at home with his wife and nine children.

== Later years ==
After retiring from full-time coaching in 1970, Rogers had a successful career as a sales manager for Independence Blue Cross. He was also a frequently sought after public speaker, presiding over many Philadelphia-area athletic ceremonies and conferences. Rogers was inducted into the Villanova Varsity Club Hall of Fame in 1979. Rogers died on April 1, 2011, at his home in Bala Cynwyd, Pennsylvania, leaving behind 9 children, 30 grandchildren, and many great-grandchildren. He was predeceased by his wife Nora (née Cassidy), in 2009.

== Head coaching record ==
=== College ===
| Year | Team | Overall | Conference | Standing | Bowl/playoffs |
|---|---|---|---|---|---|
Villanova Wildcats (Independent) (1959)
| 1959 | Villanova | 1–5 | | | |
| Villanova: | | 1–5 | | | |
| Total: | | 1–5 | | | |
