= 1959 Ivy League football season =

- League: NCAA University Division
- Sport: Football
- Duration: September 26, 1959 – November 26, 1959
- Teams: 8

1960 NFL Draft
- Top draft pick: Tom Budrewicz (Brown)
- Picked by: Chicago Bears, 140th overall

Regular season
- Champions: Penn

Football seasons
- ← 1958 1960 →

1959 Ivy League football standings
	Conf.					Overall
Team	W		L		T	W		L		T
Penn $	6	–	1	–	0	7	–	1	–	1
Dartmouth	5	–	1	–	1	5	–	3	–	1
Harvard	4	–	3	–	0	6	–	3	–	0
Yale	4	–	3	–	0	6	–	3	–	0
Cornell	3	–	4	–	0	5	–	4	–	0
Princeton	3	–	4	–	0	4	–	5	–	0
Brown	1	–	5	–	1	2	–	6	–	1
Columbia	1	–	6	–	0	2	–	7	–	0
$ – Conference champion

The 1959 Ivy League football season was the fourth season of college football play for the Ivy League and was part of the 1959 college football season. The season began on September 26, 1959, and ended on November 26, 1959. Ivy League teams were 10–5 against non-conference opponents and Penn won the conference championship.

== Season overview ==
Conf. Rank	Team	Head coach	AP final	AP high	Overall record	Conf. record	PPG	PAG
1	Penn	Steve Sebo	NR	NR	7–1–1	6–1	21.7	8.2
2	Dartmouth	Bob Blackman	NR	NR	5–3–1	5–1–1	10.7	11.8
3	Harvard	John Yovicsin	NR	NR	6–3	4–3	19.7	11.2
4	Yale	Jordan Olivar	NR	#13	6–3	4–3	17.7	10.6
5 (tie)	Cornell	George K. James	NR	NR	5–4	3–4	12.2	15.1
5 (tie)	Princeton	Dick Colman	NR	NR	4–5	3–4	13.8	10.8
7	Brown	John McLaughry	NR	NR	2–6–1	1–5–1	5.7	15.4
8	Columbia	Aldo Donelli	NR	NR	2–7	1–6	9.1	21.0

== Schedule ==
Index to colors and formatting
Ivy League member won
Ivy League member lost
Ivy League teams in **bold**

=== Week 1 ===
Date	Visiting team	Home team	Site	Result
September 26	Lafayette	**Penn**	Franklin Field • Philadelphia, PA	**W** 26–0
September 26	Holy Cross	**Dartmouth**	Memorial Field • Hanover, NH	**L** 8–31
September 26	Massachusetts	**Harvard**	Harvard Stadium • Boston, MA	**W** 36–22
September 26	Connecticut	**Yale**	Yale Bowl • New Haven, CT	**W** 20–0
September 26	**Cornell**	Colgate	Colgate University • Hamilton, NY	**W** 20–15
September 26	Rutgers	**Princeton**	Palmer Stadium • Princeton, NJ	**L** 6–8
September 26	**Columbia**	**Brown**	Brown Stadium • Providence, RI	**COL** 21–6

=== Week 2 ===
Date	Visiting team	Home team	Site	Result
October 3	**Dartmouth**	**Penn**	Franklin Field • Philadelphia, PA	**PENN** 13–0
October 3	Bucknell	**Harvard**	Harvard Stadium • Boston, MA	**W** 20–6
October 3	**Brown**	**Yale**	Yale Bowl • New Haven, CT	**YALE** 17–0
October 3	Lehigh	**Cornell**	Schoellkopf Field • Ithaca, NY	**W** 13–6
October 3	**Princeton**	**Columbia**	Baker Field • New York City, NY	**PRIN** 22–0

=== Week 3 ===
Date	Visiting team	Home team	Site	Result
October 10	**Penn**	**Princeton**	Palmer Stadium • Princeton, NJ	**PENN** 18–0
October 10	**Brown**	**Dartmouth**	Memorial Field • Hanover, NH	**T** 0–0
October 10	**Cornell**	**Harvard**	Harvard Stadium • Boston, MA	**COR** 20–16
October 10	**Columbia**	**Yale**	Yale Bowl • New Haven, CT	**YALE** 14–0

=== Week 4 ===
Date	Visiting team	Home team	Site	Result
October 17	**Brown**	**Penn**	Franklin Field • Philadelphia, PA	**PENN** 36–9
October 17	**Dartmouth**	Boston College	Alumni Stadium • Chestnut Hill, MA	**L** 12–35
October 17	**Columbia**	**Harvard**	Harvard Stadium • Boston, MA	**HAR** 38–22
October 17	**Yale**	**Cornell**	Schoellkopf Field • Ithaca, NY	**YALE** 23–0
October 17	Colgate	**Princeton**	Palmer Stadium • Princeton, NJ	**W** 42–7

=== Week 5 ===
Date	Visiting team	Home team	Site	Result
October 24	Navy	**Penn**	Franklin Field • Philadelphia, PA	**T** 22–22
October 24	**Dartmouth**	**Harvard**	Harvard Stadium • Boston, MA	**DART** 9–0
October 24	Colgate	#19 **Yale**	Yale Bowl • New Haven, CT	**W** 21–0
October 24	**Cornell**	**Princeton**	Palmer Stadium • Princeton, NJ	**PRIN** 20–0
October 24	Rhode Island	**Brown**	Brown Stadium • Providence, RI	**W** 6–0
October 24	Holy Cross	**Columbia**	Baker Field • New York City, NY	**L** 0–34

=== Week 6 ===
Date	Visiting team	Home team	Site	Result
October 31	**Harvard**	**Penn**	Franklin Field • Philadelphia, PA	**HAR** 12–0
October 31	**Dartmouth**	#13 **Yale**	Yale Bowl • New Haven, CT	**DART** 12–8
October 31	**Columbia**	**Cornell**	Schoellkopf Field • Ithaca, NY	**COR** 13–7
October 31	**Brown**	**Princeton**	Palmer Stadium • Princeton, NJ	**PRIN** 7–0

=== Week 7 ===
Date	Visiting team	Home team	Site	Result
November 7	**Yale**	**Penn**	Franklin Field • Philadelphia, PA	**PENN** 28–12
November 7	**Dartmouth**	**Columbia**	Baker Field • New York City, NY	**DART** 22–0
November 7	**Princeton**	**Harvard**	Harvard Stadium • Boston, MA	**HAR** 14–0
November 7	**Brown**	**Cornell**	Schoellkopf Field • Ithaca, NY	**COR** 19–0

=== Week 8 ===
Date	Visiting team	Home team	Site	Result
November 14	**Penn**	**Columbia**	Baker Field • New York City, NY	**PENN** 24–6
November 14	**Cornell**	**Dartmouth**	Memorial Field • Hanover, NH	**DART** 21–12
November 14	**Harvard**	**Brown**	Brown Stadium • Providence, RI	**BROWN** 16–6
November 14	**Yale**	**Princeton**	Palmer Stadium • Princeton, NJ	**YALE** 38–20

=== Week 9 ===
Date	Visiting team	Home team	Site	Result
November 21	**Dartmouth**	**Princeton**	Palmer Stadium • Princeton, NJ	**DART** 12–7
November 21	**Harvard**	**Yale**	Yale Bowl • New Haven, CT	**HAR** 35–6
November 21	Rutgers	**Columbia**	Baker Field • New York City, NY	**W** 26–16
November 26	**Cornell**	**Penn**	Franklin Field • Philadelphia, PA	**PENN** 28–13
November 26	Colgate	**Brown**	Brown Stadium • Providence, RI	**L** 14–33

== 1960 NFL draft ==
Two Ivy League players were drafted in the 1960 NFL draft, held in November 1959: Tom Budrewicz and Jack Hanlon.

Rnd.	Pick No.	NFL team	Player	Pos.	College	Conf.	Notes
12	140	Chicago Bears	Tom Budrewicz	T	Brown	Ivy	
18	213	Cleveland Browns	Jack Hanlon	B	Penn	Ivy	
