= 1959 Pittsburgh Panthers football team =

American college football season

1959 Pittsburgh Panthers football
- Conference: Independent

Ranking
- Coaches: No. T–19
- AP: No. 20
- Record: 6–4
- Head coach: John Michelosen (5th season)
- Home stadium: Pitt Stadium

1959 Eastern major college football independents records
	Conf.			Overall
Team	W	L	T	W		L		T
No. 1 Syracuse		–		11	–	0	–	0
No. 12 Penn State		–		9	–	2	–	0
Holy Cross		–		6	–	4	–	0
No. 20 Pittsburgh		–		6	–	4	–	0
Boston College		–		5	–	4	–	0
Army		–		4	–	4	–	1
Boston University		–		4	–	5	–	0
Colgate		–		2	–	7	–	0
Villanova		–		1	–	9	–	0
Rankings from AP poll

The 1959 Pittsburgh Panthers football team represented the University of Pittsburgh as an independent during the 1959 college football season. The team compiled a 6–4 record under head coach John Michelosen. The team played their home games at Pitt Stadium in Pittsburgh.

== Schedule ==
Date	Opponent	Rank	Site	Result	Attendance	Source
September 19	at Marquette		Marquette Stadium; Milwaukee, WI	W 21–15	15,125	
September 25	at No. 11 USC		Los Angeles Memorial Coliseum; Los Angeles, CA	L 0–23	34,172	
October 3	UCLA		Pitt Stadium; Pittsburgh, PA	W 25–21	30,683	
October 10	Duke		Pitt Stadium; Pittsburgh, PA	W 12–0	38,749	
October 17	at West Virginia	No. 20	Mountaineer Field; Morgantown, WV (rivalry)	L 15–23	30,000	
October 24	No. 16 TCU		Pitt Stadium; Pittsburgh, PA	L 3–13	27,397	
October 31	No. 5 Syracuse		Pitt Stadium; Pittsburgh, PA (rivalry)	L 0–35	25,761	
November 7	at Boston College		Alumni Stadium; Chestnut Hill, MA	W 22–14	13,000	
November 14	Notre Dame		Pitt Stadium; Pittsburgh, PA (rivalry)	W 28–13	52,337	
November 21	No. 7 Penn State		Pitt Stadium; Pittsburgh, PA (rivalry)	W 22–7	46,109	
Rankings from AP Poll released prior to the game

== Preseason ==
The University of Pittsburgh, under the direction of Chancellor Edward Litchfield, bought Forbes Field in 1958, and agreed to lease it to the Pirates until a new stadium was constructed. On January 12, 1959, The Pittsburgh Press reported that the City Council asked the Public Auditorium Authority to prepare a plan for a new municipal sports stadium. A citizen's committee proposed the stadium be built on Monument Hill on the North Side. The cost of the land and stadium was estimated to be 23 million dollars. Pitt athletic director Tom Hamilton countered that the city should upgrade Pitt Stadium instead of building a new facility. He wanted to save the city money and keep the stadium on campus. Dr. Litchfield was in favor of the municipal stadium. Hamilton did not want the Steelers to play in Pitt Stadium, Dr. Litchfield did. Hamilton did not want Litchfield to implement the trimester plan. Hamilton and the rest of the athletic department felt it would put Pitt at a disadvantage athletically. The trimester plan was implemented. Tom Hamilton resigned as athletic director effective August 31, 1959. He became the commissioner of the newly formed Athletic Association of Western Universities. Frank Carver, long time Pitt graduate manager, was appointed acting athletic director.

On March 14, two expelled players (fullback Marty Barraca and center Mike Lucci) and two withdrawals (letterwinner quarterback Ed Sharockman and fullback Pat Morsillo) headed south to spend the spring and summer in Florida. They thought they could pursue their football careers elsewhere. A week later tackle Len Vella withdrew from classes due to academic problems.

Coach John Michelosen welcomed 65 candidates, including 17 lettermen, for his fifth year of spring practice. The Panthers were allowed 20 practice sessions to be completed in 30 days. Since the withdrawal of Ed Sharockman, finding a back-up quarterback was Coach Michelosen's main priority. The drills concluded on May 2 with the annual intra-squad game at the Pitt-Wildwood Club field. A crowd of 2,000 fans watched the Whites defeat the Blues 26–20.

On August 24, sixty-four gridders showed up for fall practice. Two-a-day sessions (9:30 a.m. and 3:30 p.m.) were held until the start of school on September 8. Coach Michelosen was surprised by the excellent condition of his players. He told the Post-Gazette: “Notice there isn't much fat on this squad? Only one or two of them seem to have any excess weight, and most of them are down to playing weight already. Of course, it won't take long to get the other few trimmed down, too, if the weather continues.” Tackles Bill Lindner and Ken Montanari were named co-captains for the 1959 season.

== Game summaries ==
=== at Marquette ===
Week 1: Pitt at Marquette

Team	1	2	3	4	Total
• Pitt	0	0	13	8	21
Marquette	0	0	12	3	15

- Date: September 19, 1959
- Location: Marquette Stadium
  Milwaukee, WI
- Game start: 1:30 p.m.
- Game attendance: 15,125
- Game weather: warm with drizzle
- Referee: Mike Delaney

Scoring summary
3	PITT	Mike Ditka 25-yard pass from Ivan Toncic (kick missed)	PITT 6–0
3	MARQ	Larry Hubbard 30-yard pass from Peter Hall (pass failed)	TIED 6–6
3	PITT	Jim Cunningham 53-yard pass interception (Norton Seaman kick)	PITT 13–6
3	MARQ	Hall 5-yard run (kick failed)	PITT 13–12
4	MARQ	Jim Webster 27-yard field goal	MARQ 15–13
4	PITT	Ditka 5-yard pass from Toncic (John Yaccino pass from Toncic))	PITT 21–15

On September 19, the Panthers opened their season in Milwaukee, WI against the Marquette Warriors. The Panthers led the all-time series 2–0, but this was their first trip to Marquette Stadium. The Warriors were coached by Lisle Blackbourn. He coached Marquette from 1950-1953 to a record of 18–17–4 then jumped to the pros to coach the Green Bay Packers from 1954-1957. He coached the 1958 season at Carroll College before returning to Marquette. The Warriors record the three previous years was 2–25–1, but they had 25 lettermen returning.

Coach Michelosen told The Pitt News: “The kids are in pretty good shape physically. Mentally it's hard to say, this is the first time we have opened the season after classes started. I don't know how this will affect the boys mentally. There are many factors that enter into the boys (sic) life that we don't have to contend with when there are no classes.”

In front of 15,175 fans, the Pitt Panthers needed a fourth quarter comeback to beat the Marquette Warriors 21–15. After a scoreless first half, 25 points were scored in the third period. Pitt took the kick-off and drove 60 yards in 5 plays. Mike Ditka caught a 25-yard Ivan Toncic pass for the touchdown. Norton Seaman's extra point went wide-left. Marquette tied the game on a 30-yard touchdown pass from Pete Hall to Larry Hubbard. Pitt center Foge Fazio blocked the extra point. Marquette regained possession, but Pitt defensive back Jim Cunningham intercepted an errant Hall pass and ran 54-yards for a touchdown. Seaman made the placement to put Pitt ahead 13–6. Marquette came right back and scored on a 5-yard keeper play by Hall. Fred Riddle blocked the extra point and Pitt led 13–12 going into the fourth quarter. Marquette marched to the Panthers 2-yard line but turned the ball over on downs. Pitt halfback Joe Scisly fumbled the ball back to the Warriors. The Pitt defense held, but Jim Webster kicked a 17-yard field goal to put Marquette ahead 15–13. The Panthers offense was ineffective and forced to punt. Then the Pitt defense forced Marquette into a punting situation from the warriors 31-yard line. Ditka broke through the line and blocked Hall's punt. Hall recovered but Ditka tackled him on the 6-yard line – first and goal for the Panthers. On second down, Toncic passed to Ditka for the go-ahead touchdown. The Panthers faked a placement and Toncic passed to John Yaccino for the two-point conversion. Pitt led 21–15. The Marquette offense drove to the Panthers 13-yard line before they lost the ball on downs. Pitt then ran out the clock.

Marquette won the statistical battle. They made 25 first downs, gained 119 yards rushing and 273 yards passing. Pete Hall completed 22 of 43 passes (1 touchdown and 1 interception). Larry Hubbard caught 11 passes for 132 yards (1 touchdown). Si Woods caught 5 passes for 87 yards. Pitt made 9 first downs, gained 175 yards rushing and gained another 54 yards passing by Ivan Toncic completing 7 of 15 passes. (2 for touchdowns and 1 interception). Mike Ditka caught 3 passes for 37 yards (2 touchdowns).

The Pitt starting lineup for the game against Marquette was Mike Ditka (left end), Ken Montanari (left tackle), Norton Seaman (left guard), Serafino Fazio (center), Bob Longfellow (right guard), Dick Mills (right tackle), Ron Delfine (right end), Ivan Toncic (quarterback), Andy Sepsi (left halfback), Joe Scisly (right halfback) and Jim Cunningham (fullback). Substitutes appearing in the game for Pitt were Steve Jastrzembski, Joe Latvis, Charles Marranca, Regis Coustiliac, Andrew Kuzneski, John Holzbach, Larry Vignali, Dennis Dvorchak, Ernie Westwood, David Walker, David Kraus, John Sakal, Ray Tarasi, Fred Cox, Chuck Reinhold, Bob Clemens, Curt Plowman, John Yaccino, Fred Riddle and Michael Frasca.

=== at USC ===
Week 2: Pitt at USC

Team	1	2	3	4	Total
Pitt	0	0	0	0	0
• USC	10	0	13	0	23

- Date: September 25, 1959
- Location: Los Angeles Memorial Coliseum
  Los Angeles, CA
- Game start: 8:00 p.m.
- Game attendance: 34,172
- Game weather: warm
- Referee: Ed Wagner

Scoring summary
1	USC	Willie Wood 31-yard field goal	USC 3–0
1	USC	Jim Conroy 1-yard run (Wood kick)	USC 10–0
3	USC	Jim Maples 50-yard pass from Ben Charles (kick failed)	USC 16–0
3	USC	Maples 5-yard run (Don Zachik kick)	USC 23–0

On September 24, the Panthers second road trip was a cross-country flight to Los Angeles to play the Southern Cal Trojans on Friday night in the Los Angeles Memorial Coliseum. The Panthers flew in a TWA jet. (Supposedly, the first team to fly by jet to a sporting event.) The all-time series was tied at 3–3.

Coach Don Clark's Trojans beat Oregon State in their opening game and were ranked #11 in the weekly AP football poll. His line-up contained All-American candidates: Mike McKeever, Marlin McKeever, Ron Mix, and Willie Wood.

In front of only 34,172 fans, the USC Trojans dominated the Pitt Panthers 23–0. USC took the opening kick-off and drove to the Panthers 15-yard line. The Panthers defense held and Trojan quarterback Willie Wood booted a 31-yard field goal. Later in the quarter Mike Ditka shanked a punt, and USC returned it to the Pitt 30-yard line. Five plays later, the Panthers defense held on a fourth and 1 at the goal line, but they were offsides. Jim Conroy scored on the next play, and Wood added the extra point for a 10–0 USC lead. Willie Wood was injured on a tackle in the second quarter, and the USC offense was held in check. After halftime, Wood was replaced by Ben Charles (from Lancaster, PA). USC gained possession on the 50-yard line and Charles threw a pass to Jim Maples for a touchdown. Maples missed the extra point. The Trojans regained possession when Maples intercepted a Pete Prince pass, and returned it to the Pitt 15-yard line. Two offside calls moved the ball to the 5-yard line. Then Maples scored through the left side, and Don Sachik's placement finished the scoring. In the final quarter, USC running back Angelo Coia ran 47 yards for a touchdown that was called back for holding.

The Panthers were held to 27 yards rushing by the Trojans defense. This was the lowest total during Michelosen's reign. They gained 95 yards through the air. Both teams made 9 first downs. USC had 158 yards rushing and 118 yards passing. Pitt was penalized 53 yards, while USC was penalized 130 yards.

The Pitt starting lineup for the game against USC was Mike Ditka (left end), Ken Montanari (left tackle), Paul Hodge (left guard), Andrew Kuzneski (center), Larry Vignali (right guard), Ed Fornadel (right tackle), John Kuprok (right end), David Kraus (quarterback), Andy Sepsi (left halfback), Curt Plowman (right halfback) and Jim Cunningham (fullback). Substitutes appearing in the game for Pitt were Steve Jastrzembski, Heywood Haser, Ernie Westwood, Norton Seaman, Serafino Fazio, Bob Longfellow, Bill Lindner, Dick Mills, David Walker, Ron Delfine, Bob Rathi, Ivan Toncic, Pete Prince, Ray Tarasi, Fred Cox, Chuck Reinhold, Bob Clemens, John Yaccino, Joe Scisly, Fred Riddle and Michael Frasca.

=== UCLA ===
Week 3: UCLA at Pitt

Team	1	2	3	4	Total
UCLA	0	14	0	7	21
• Pitt	0	0	6	19	25

- Date: October 3, 1959
- Location: Pitt Stadium
  Pittsburgh, PA
- Game start: 1:30 p.m.
- Game attendance: 30,683
- Game weather: warm
- Referee: John H. Coles (Westminster)

Scoring summary
2	UCLA	Marv Luster 26-yard pass from Bill Kilmer (Ivory Jones kick)	UCLA 7–0
2	UCLA	Luster 33-yard pass from Gene Gaines (Jones kick)	UCLA 14–0
3	PITT	Ron Delfine 9-yard pass from Ivan Toncic (run failed)	UCLA 14–6
4	UCLA	Ray Smith 2-yard run (Jones kick)	UCLA 21–6
4	PITT	Fred Cox 9-yard pass from Toncic (pass failed)	UCLA 21–12
4	PITT	Mike Ditka 49-yard pass from Toncic (pass failed)	UCLA 21–18
4	PITT	Steve Jastrzembski 16-yard pass from Toncic (Cox kick))	PITT 25–21

On October 3, the Panthers played their home opener against the UCLA Bruins. Second-year coach Bill Barnes' Bruins tied Purdue (0–0) in their first game. This was UCLA's first trip to Pittsburgh. Pitt led the series 1–0 after beating UCLA 27–6 in Los Angeles in 1958.

For the second time in three games, the Panthers needed a fourth quarter comeback to win 25–21. After a scoreless first quarter, UCLA quarterback Bill Kilmer connected with Marv Lester on a 26-yard touchdown pass early in the second period. Later in the quarter, halfback Gene Gaines threw a 33-yard touchdown pass to Lester. Ivory Jones made both placements and UCLA led 14–0 at halftime. The Panthers offense was ineffective in the first half, as they fumbled 3 times and threw two interceptions. Pitt took the second half kick-off and drove 65-yards in 14 plays for their first score. On a fourth-down play, Ivan Toncic passed 9-yards to Ron Delfine for the touchdown. Toncic's two-point attempt failed. The Bruins answered with a 77-yard drive in 9 plays to start the final period. Fullback Ray Smith plunged over from the 1-yard line and Jones kicked the extra point for a 21–6 UCLA lead. Then the Pitt offense decided to play. Pitt drove to the UCLA 26-yard line. Toncic was sacked for a 12-yard loss. Then he completed a 28-yard throw to Fred Cox on the 10-yard line. On third down from the 8-yard line, Toncic hit Cox in the left corner of the end zone. The 2-point conversion failed and Pitt trailed 21–12. Five minutes and forty-one seconds remained. The Pitt defense stiffened and UCLA chose to punt on third down giving Pitt possession on the UCLA 49-yard line. On second down, Toncic threw a 49-yard touchdown pass to Mike Ditka. Toncic's pass for the conversion fell incomplete, and Pitt trailed 21–18. The Pitt defense forced another punt, and took possession on their own 36-yard line with 1 minute and 56 seconds to play. On third down Toncic scrambled and completed a 47-yard pass to Steve Jastrzemski on the UCLA 16-yard line. On third down, with 31 seconds remaining, Toncic threw to Jastrzemski for the winning touchdown. Cox booted the extra point and Pitt led 25–21. The Panthers kick-off was fumbled by Gaines, and the Panthers recovered as the game ended.

Ivan “The Wonderful” Toncic completed 15 of 28 passes for 247 yards and 4 touchdowns. He was intercepted twice. He told the Sun-Telegraph: “We don't play for ties....I don't know how I was able to throw those passes at the end. My arm hurt every time I raised it...But we were bad in the first half. We were terrible. Everything we did was wrong. It could have been worse than the SC game (23–0) if we hadn't got going in the second half.”

The Pitt starting lineup for the game against UCLA was Mike Ditka (left end), Ken Montanari (left tackle), Norton Seaman (left guard), Serafino Fazio (center), Larry Vignali (right guard), Bill Lindner (right tackle), Ron Delfine (right end), David Kraus (quarterback), Andy Sepsi (left halfback), Curt Plowman (right halfback) and Fred Riddle (fullback). Substitutes appearing in the game for Pitt were Steve Jastrzembski, Heywood Haser, Ernie Westwood, Charles Marranca, Paul Hodge, Robert Budavich, Andrew Kuzneski, Dick Matyus, Bob Longfellow, Dennis Dvorchak, Dick Mills, David Walker, John Kuprok, Bob Rathi, Ivan Toncic, Fred Cox, Chuck Reinhold, Bob Clemens, Joe Scisly and Jim Cunningham.

=== Duke ===
Week 4: Duke at Pitt

Team	1	2	3	4	Total
Duke	0	0	0	0	0
• Pitt	6	0	0	6	12

- Date: October 10, 1959
- Location: Pitt Stadium
  Pittsburgh, PA
- Game start: 1:30 p.m.
- Game attendance: 38,749
- Game weather: sunny and warm
- Referee: David H. Buchanan (Temple)

Scoring summary
1	PITT	Joe Scisly 4-yard run (kick missed)	PITT 6–0
4	PITT	Mike Ditka 56-yard pass from Ivan Toncic (pass failed))	PITT 12–0

On October 10, the Duke Blue Devils (1–2) under the tutelage of Bill Murray met the Panthers for the twelfth time. Duke led the series 6–5 and was a 1-point favorite. All-American guard Mike McGee was one of 21 returning lettermen for the Blue Devils.

Both starting halfback Jim Cunningham (hip) and guard Bob Longfellow (leg) were injured against UCLA and not available. Pitt quarterback Ivan Toncic ranked number 5 in the country in passing by completing 32 of 72 passes for 396 yards.

The Panthers evened the all-time series at 6–6 by shutting out the Blue Devils 12–0 in front of 38,479 fans. Pitt took the opening kick-off and drove 65-yards in 10 plays. Joe Scisly ran the last 4 yards for the score. Fred Cox's placement was wide left. In the second period the Panthers offense fumbled, had a punt blocked and threw an interception, but the defense managed to throttle the Duke offense. Duke managed only 5 first downs in the game. In the final quarter Ivan Toncic threw a 56-yard touchdown pass to Mike Ditka to seal the victory. The two point conversion fell incomplete. It was Toncic's seventh touchdown pass of the season, which tied him with Bob Bestwick and Corny Salvaterra for the all-time Pitt lead.

The Pitt starting lineup for the game against Duke was Mike Ditka (left end), Ken Montanari (left tackle), Norton Seaman (left guard), Serafino Fazio (center), Larry Vignali (right guard), Bill Lindner (right tackle), Ron Delfine (right end), Ivan Toncic (quarterback), Chuck Reinhold (left halfback),Joe Scisly (right halfback) and Fred Riddle (fullback). Substitutes appearing in the game for Pitt were Steve Jastrzembski, Heywood Haser, Ernie Westwood, Dick Mills, Charles Marranca, Paul Hodge, Andrew Kuzneski, Dick Matyus, Bob Guzik, David Walker, Bob Rathi, David Kraus, Fred Cox, Bob Clemens, Ray Tarasi, Curt Plowman, John Yaccino and Michael Frasca.

=== at West Virginia ===
Week 5: Pitt at West Virginia

Team	1	2	3	4	Total
Pitt	0	7	0	8	15
• West Virginia	0	10	7	6	23

- Date: October 17, 1959
- Location: Mountaineer Field
  Morgantown
- Game start: 1:30 p.m.
- Game attendance: 30,000
- Game weather: cloudy and breezy
- Referee: Henry G. Munder

Scoring summary
2	PITT	Dick Mills 11-yard run with blocked punt (Norton Seaman kick)	PITT 7–0
2	WVU	John Marra 12-yard pass from Danny Williams (John Thackston kick)	TIED 7–7
2	WVU	Thackston 30-yard field goal	WVU 10–7
3	WVU	Williams 1-yard run (Thackston kick)	WVU 17–7
4	PITT	Andy Sepsi 2-yard run (Steve Jastrzemsski pass from Ivan Toncic	WVU 17–15
4	WVU	Dick Herrig 30-yard pass interception (kick missed))	WVU 23–15

On October 17, Pitt traveled to Morgantown, WV for the 1959 edition of the Backyard Brawl. It was the Homecoming game for coach Art Lewis' Mountaineers. The #20-ranked Panthers led the series 38–12–1 and were a 2-touchdown favorite. West Virginia had a 2–2 record for the season.

In front of 30,000 Homecoming fans, the West Virginia Mountaineers defeated the Panthers in Morgantown for the first time since 1895. The final score read 23–15. Pitt scored in the second period when Norton Seaman blocked a quick kick attempt by Curt Harmon and Dick Mills picked it up on the 10-yard line and ran it into the end zone. Seaman added the extra point and Pitt led 7–0. The Mountaineers then proceeded to score 17 unanswered points to go ahead 17–7 at the end of the third quarter. Mountaineers quarterback Danny Williams passed for one touchdown and then he ran for the other. John Thackston converted the extra points and booted a 30-yard field goal in between the touchdowns. In the final period, the Panthers cut into the lead with an 11-play, 75-yard drive that ended with Andy Sepsi running in from the 2-yard line. An Ivan Toncic to Steve Jastrzembski pass made the score 17–15 with 7:44 to play. The Mountaineers offense kept the ball for almost 5 minutes, but Pitt finally held and regained possession. On first down, Mountaineers defensive back Dick Herrig intercepted Toncic's pass and raced 30-yards for the final score. Thackston's placement was blocked by Serafino Fazio. There were two minutes remaining, but the Mountaineers forced Toncic into throwing his fifth interception to the delight of the Homecoming crowd.

The Pitt starting lineup for the game against WVU was Mike Ditka (left end), Ken Montanari (left tackle), Norton Seaman (left guard), Serafino Fazio (center), Larry Vignali (right guard), Bill Lindner (right tackle), Bob Rathi (right end), Ivan Toncic (quarterback), Chuck Reinhold (left halfback), Fred Cox (right halfback) and Fred Riddle (fullback). Substitutes appearing in the game for Pitt were Steve Jastrzembski, Heywood Haser, Ernie Westwood, Dick Mills, Charles Marranca, Paul Hodge, Andrew Kuzneski, Bob Longfellow, Bob Guzik, David Walker, Ron Delfine, David Kraus, Andy Sepsi, Joe Scisly, Ray Tarasi, Curt Plowman and John Yaccino.

=== TCU ===
Week 6: TCU at Pitt

Team	1	2	3	4	Total
• TCU	7	0	0	6	13
Pitt	3	0	0	0	3

- Date: October 24, 1959
- Location: Pitt Stadium
  Pittsburgh, PA
- Game start: 1:30 p.m.
- Game attendance: 27,397
- Game weather: showers
- Referee: Bob Finley (SMU)

Scoring summary
1	PITT	Norton Seaman 40-yard field goal	PITT 3–0
1	TCU	Jack Spikes 1-yard run (R. E. Dodson kick)	TCU 7–3
4	PITT	Marvin Lasater 8-yard run (kick failed))	TCU 13–3

On October 24, Pitt played the TCU Horned Frogs for the first time. Abe Martin's Frogs were the defending Southwest Conference Champs. They were 3–2 for the season, ranked #16 and a touchdown favorite. The TCU roster had 28 returning lettermen, including future pros - tackles Don Floyd and Bob Lilly, and fullback Jack Spikes.

On a day of miserable weather, 27,397 fans saw the TCU offense complete 1 pass, but run the Panthers ragged for a 13–3 victory. For the second week in a row the Panthers scored first. Pitt took the opening kick-off and marched to the TCU 30-yard line, where the TCU defense forced a field goal attempt. Norton Seaman connected from 40-yards and Pitt led 3–0. The TCU offense answered with a 13-play, 61-yard drive. Jack Spikes went over tackle from the 1-yard line for the touchdown and R. E. Dodson booted his ninth straight extra point for a 7–3 TCU lead. The Pitt offense drove deep into TCU territory 4 times, but was never able to score. In the final quarter, played in a heavy rain, Pitt quarterback Ivan Toncic fumbled on his own 16-yard line and Bob Lilly recovered for TCU. On the fourth play Marvin Lasater scored on an 8-yard run. The center snap was fumbled on the extra point.

The Pitt starting lineup for the game against TCU was Mike Ditka (left end), Ken Montanari (left tackle), Norton Seaman (left guard), Serafino Fazio (center), Larry Vignali (right guard), Bill Lindner (right tackle), Ron Delfine (right end), Ivan Toncic (quarterback), Chuck Reinhold (left halfback), Joe Scisly (right halfback) and Fred Riddle (fullback). Substitutes appearing in the game for Pitt were Steve Jastrzembski, John Kuprok, Ernie Westwood, Robert Budavich, Dick Mills, Paul Hodge, Regis Coustillac, Andrew Kuzneski, Dick Matyus, Bob Longfellow, Bob Guzik, Bob Rathi, David Kraus, Andy Sepsi, Fred Cox, Ray Tarasi, Bob Clemens, Curt Plowman and John Yaccino.

=== Syracuse ===
Week 7: Syracuse at Pitt

Team	1	2	3	4	Total
• Syracuse	7	7	7	14	35
Pitt	0	0	0	0	0

- Date: October 31, 1959
- Location: Pitt Stadium
  Pittsburgh, PA
- Game start: 1:30 p.m.
- Game attendance: 25,761
- Game weather: rain
- Referee: Gerald F. Hogan (Arkansas)

Scoring summary
1	SYR	Gerhard Schwedes 1-yard run (Robert Yates kick)	SYR 7–0
2	SYR	Ernie Davis 25-yard run (Yates kick)	SYR 14–0
3	SYR	Art Baker 23-yard run (Yates kick)	SYR 21–0
4	SYR	Mark Weber 1-yard run (Yates kick)	SYR 28–0
4	SYR	Dan Rackiewicz 101-yard pass interception (Yates kick))	SYR 35–0

The Panthers scheduled the Syracuse Orangemen for their Homecoming opponent. Coach Ben Schwartzwalder's Orange were 5–0, and on their way to a national title. The Panthers led the all-time series 8–4–2, but Syracuse had won the past two meetings. The Syracuse lineup had 6 All-America candidates: Ernie Davis, Art Baker, Ger Schwedes, Fred Mautino, Robert Yates and Roger Davis. Syracuse led the nation in scoring (36.4 per game), total offense (441.4 yards per game), total defense (100.2 yards per game) and rushing defense (28.0 yards per game). They were second in rushing offense (302.6 yards per game).

The Pittsburgh Press sportswriter Chester L. Smith wrote: “The Jungle Cats, in losing 35–0, were out-blocked, out-tackled, out-passed and, with great ease, out-run, especially to the outside.” The game was played in a steady downpour to the dismay of the 25,761 Homecoming fans. Syracuse scored a touchdown in each quarter to take a 28–0 lead. Then, the Pitt offense drove past the Syracuse 40-yard line for the first time in the game, aided by a pass interference penalty, to the 15-yard line. Two plays moved the ball to the 4-yard line. On first down, Dave Kraus threw a pass for Steve Jastrzembski that was intercepted by Dan Rackiewicz, and returned 100 yards for a touchdown.

Pitt earned 7 first downs, gained 80 yards passing and –6 yards rushing. Syracuse earned 21 first downs, gained 116 yards passing and 271 yards rushing. Ernie Davis led the Orange with 68 yards rushing on 10 carries.

The Pitt starting lineup for the game against Syracuse was Mike Ditka (left end), Ken Montanari (left tackle), Norton Seaman (left guard), Serafino Fazio (center), Larry Vignali (right guard), Bill Lindner (right tackle), Ron Delfine (right end), Ivan Toncic (quarterback), Chuck Reinhold (left halfback), Joe Scisly (right halfback) and Curt Plowman (fullback). Substitutes appearing in the game for Pitt were Steve Jastrzembski, John Kuprok, Ernie Westwood, Ed Fornadel, Robert Budavich, Dick Mills, Paul Hodge, Regis Coustillac, Andrew Kuzneski, Dick Matyus, Dennis Dvorchak, Charles Marranca, David Walker, Bob Guzik, Bob Rathi, David Kraus, John Sakal, Andy Sepsi, Fred Cox, Bob Clemens, Fred Riddle, Jim Cunningham, Michael Frasca and John Yaccino.

=== at Boston College ===
Week 8: Pitt at Boston College

Team	1	2	3	4	Total
• Pitt	0	3	12	7	22
Boston College	0	7	7	0	14

- Date: November 7, 1959
- Location: Alumni Stadium
  Chestnut Hill, MA
- Game start: 1:30 p.m.
- Game attendance: 13,000
- Game weather: cold and rain
- Referee: David H. Buchanan (Temple)

Scoring summary
2	BC	Bill Robinson 3-yard pass from John Amabile (Louis Kirouac kick)	BC 7–0
2	PITT	Fred Cox 25-yard field goal	BC 7–3
3	PITT	Cox 63-yard run (run failed)	PITT 9–7
3	BC	Vin Hogan 90-yard kick-off return (Kirouac kick)	BC 14–9
3	PITT	Cox 25-yard pass from Ivan Toncic (pass failed)	PITT 15–14
4	PITT	Jim Cunningham 2-yard run (Cox kick))	PITT 22–14

On November 7, the Panthers final road trip was to Boston, MA to play the Boston College Eagles for the first time. Coach Mike Holovak's squad was 4–2, and on a 4-game winning streak. Holovak stated: “We're going to have to play our very best, perhaps over our heads, to beat Pitt.” The Eagles were led by quarterback Johnny Amabile, who had completed 53 of 95 passes for 825 yards.

Since Norton Seaman (leg) and Mike Ditka (hip) were injured in the Syracuse game, Coach Michelosen decided to start sophomores against the Eagles. Halfbacks Fred Cox and Bob Clemens were in the backfield along with junior Jim Cunningham, who was finally healthy after an early season charley horse. Guard Regis Coustillac replaced Seaman, who did not make the trip, and Steve Jastrzembski replaced Ditka.

On TV for the first time, and playing in rain for the third straight week, the Panthers prevailed 22–14 by scoring three second half touchdowns. In the second quarter, Boston College scored first on a 3-yard touchdown pass from John Amabile to Bill Robinson. Lou Kirouav converted the extra point. Pitt answered with a drive to the Boston College 7-yard line, which resulted in a 25-yard Fred Cox field goal that made the halftime score 7–3. Pitt received the second half kick-off. On the third play Fred Cox ran 63-yards unmolested to the end zone. The 2-point conversion failed. Eagle halfback Vin Hogan returned the ensuing kick-off 90 yards for their second touchdown and Kirouav converted to put Boston College ahead 14–9. The Panthers answered again with a 44-yard drive at the end of the quarter. Ivan Toncic's second pass completion of the day was a 24-yard touchdown to Cox. The 2-point conversion failed and Pitt led 15–14. On the last play of the third quarter, Pitt center Serafino Fazio intercepted Amabile's pass deep in Panthers territory. After an exchange of punts, the Panthers regained possession on their 20-yard line. The Panthers then controlled the ball for over 7 minutes until fullback Jim Cunningham scored the final touchdown on a 1-yard plunge. Cox booted the extra point for his sixteenth point of the game. (2 touchdowns, 1 field goal, 1 extra point) The Eagles tried to rally, but Jim Clemens intercepted Amabile's pass and Pitt ran out the clock.

Ivan Toncic set a single season record with his eighth touchdown pass. Jim Cunningham carried 22 times for 106 yards and Fred Cox carried 13 times for 96 yards.

The Pitt starting lineup for the game against Boston College was Steve Jastrzembski (left end), Ken Montanari (left tackle), Regis Coustillac (left guard), Serafino Fazio (center), Larry Vignali (right guard), Bill Lindner (right tackle), Ron Delfine (right end), David Kraus (quarterback), Fred Cox(left halfback), Joe Scisly (right halfback) and Jim Cunningham (fullback). Substitutes appearing in the game for Pitt were MIke Ditka, Curt Plowman, Chuck Reinhold, Ernie Westwood, Dick Mills, Paul Hodge, Dick Matyus, Charles Marranca, David Walker, Bob Guzik, Bob Rathi, Ivan Toncic, Andy Sepsi and Bob Clemens.

=== Notre Dame ===
Week 9: Notre Dame at Pitt

Team	1	2	3	4	Total
Notre Dame	0	0	7	6	13
• Pitt	7	7	0	14	28

- Date: November 14, 1959
- Location: Pitt Stadium
  Pittsburgh, PA
- Game start: 1:30 p.m.
- Game attendance: 52,237
- Game weather: cold and rainy
- Referee: Francis Brennan (Canisus)

Scoring summary
1	PITT	Bob Clemens 64-yard punt return (Fred Cox kick)	PITT 7–0
2	PITT	Fred Cox 44-yard run (Cox kick)	PITT 14–0
3	ND	Bob Scarpitto 58-yard pass from Don White (Monte Stickles kick)	PITT 14–7
4	PITT	Jim Cunningham 8-yard run (Cox kick)	PITT 21–7
4	PITT	Cunningham 3-yard run (Cox kick)	PITT 28–7
4	ND	Scarpitto 8-yard pass from George Izo (kick failed))	PITT 28–13

On November 14, the Panthers and Notre Dame played for the 26th time. Notre Dame led the all-time series 16–8–1, but Pitt had won two of the previous three games. First-year coach Joe Kuharich, whose team was 3–4, was not happy that the Irish were favored. “That's not right” Kuharich complained. “We shouldn't be picked over anybody this season, yet we've been underdogs only against Northwestern. Those odds-makers must still be thinking of the old Notre Dame.”

Norton Seaman (leg) was lost for the season, but Mike Ditka was back in the lineup and fullback Fred Riddle was fully recovered from his foot injury. Coach Michelosen started sophomores Bob Clemens and Fred Cox in the backfield with Jim Cunningham and Ivan Toncic. The game was sold out and was broadcast over eastern regional television.

The Panthers won their fifth game by out-playing the Irish on a rainy day 28–13. Bob Clemens returned a first period punt 64 yards for a touchdown, and Fred Cox scored on a 44 yard dash in the second quarter, plus both extra points, to put Pitt ahead at halftime 14–0. The Irish managed to cut the lead in half on the second play of the third quarter. Irish quarterback Don White threw a 58-yard scoring pass to Bob Scarpitto and Monte Stickles added the placement. The rest of the quarter was a punting duel. The Panthers' Dave Walker recovered an Irish fumble early in the final period on the Notre Dame 6-yard line. Jim Cunningham scored on second down and Cox added the extra point to put Pitt ahead 21–7. The Panthers defense forced a punt that Cunningham fielded on the Irish 44-yard line and returned to the 28. Six plays later Cunningham scored Pitt's final touchdown and Cox booted the placement. Notre Dame quarterback George Izo led a last gasp rally going 72 yards in 7 plays. He threw an 8-yard touchdown pass to Sarpitto to cut the lead to 28–13 (Stickles missed the extra point) with less than three minutes remaining. Pitt ran out the clock.

Jim Cunningham led the Pitt ground game with 101 yards on 22 carries, and Fred Cox gained 99 yards on 10 carries.

The Pitt starting lineup for the game against Notre Dame was Mike Ditka (left end), Ken Montanari (left tackle), Regis Coustillac (left guard), Serafino Fazio (center), Larry Vignali (right guard), Bill Lindner (right tackle), Ron Delfine (right end), Ivan Toncic (quarterback), Bob Clemens (left halfback), Fred Cox (right halfback) and Jim Cunningham (fullback). Substitutes appearing in the game for Pitt were Steve Jastrzembski, Ernie Westwood, Robert Budavich, Andrew Kuzneski, Dick Mills, Paul Hodge, Dick Matyus, Bob Longfellow, Dennis Dvorchak, Charles Marranca, Ed Fornadel, David Walker, Bob Guzik, Bob Rathi, David Kraus, Andy Sepsi, Chuck Reinhold, Curt Plowman, Fred Riddle and John Yaccino.

=== Penn State ===
Week 10: Penn State at Pitt

Team	1	2	3	4	Total
Penn State	0	0	7	0	7
• Pitt	9	7	6	0	22

- Date: November 21, 1959
- Location: Pitt Stadium
  Pittsburgh, PA
- Game start: 1:30 p.m.
- Game attendance: 46,109
- Game weather: sunny and cool
- Referee: Gerald Hogan (Arkansas)

Scoring summary
1	PITT	Serafino Fazio and Ron Delfine tackled Richie Lucas in end zone for a safety	PITT 2–0
1	PITT	Ivan Toncic 1-yard run (Fred Cox kick)	PITT 9–0
2	PITT	Bob Clemens 35-yard run (Cox kick)	PITT 16–0
4	PITT	Cox 86-yard run ( kick missed)	PITT 22–0
4	PSU	Richard Pae 9-yard run (Sam Stelletella kick ))	PITT 22–7

Pitt closed its season on November 21 against in-state rival Penn State. Rip Engle's Lions were 8–1 for the season and headed to the Liberty Bowl. Their only loss was to National Champion Syracuse 20–18. All-American quarterback Richie Lucas led the offense.

Pitt led the all-time series 32–23–3. Coach Engle was 5–3–1 against the Panthers, and Michelosen was 1–2–1 against the Lions. Penn State was a touchdown favorite. Michelosen used the Clemens, Cox and Cunningham backfield combination again.

On a rare sunny Saturday in Pittsburgh, the Panthers finished their season 6–4 with a decisive 22–7 win over the Lions. After the opening kick-off, the Pitt defense forced a punt, and then the offense drove to the State 1-yard line before losing the ball on downs. On first down, quarterback Richie Lucas rolled out and was tackled in the end zone by Serafino Fazio and Ron Delfine for a safety. Jim Cunningham returned the ensuing kick-off to the State 40-yard line. Nine plays later quarterback Ivan Toncic sneaked into the end zone from 1-yard out for the touchdown. Fred Cox added the extra point for a 9–0 lead. Penn State answered with a drive into Pitt territory to the 24-yard line. Lion Sam Stellatella tried a 29-yard field goal, but Pitt end Ron Delfine blocked and recovered it on the 29-yard line for the Panthers. Seven plays moved the ball to the Lions 35-yard line. On first down, Jim Clemens took a pitchout from Toncic around right end with blocking in front and scored Pitt's second touchdown. Cox booted the extra point and Pitt led at halftime 16–0. On the first play from scrimmage in the third quarter, Fred Cox went left, cut upfield and out ran everyone 86 yards for Pitt's final touchdown of the season. He botched the extra point, but Pitt led 22–0. State avoided a shutout with late touchdown on an 8-yard run by Dick Pae. Stellatella converted the placement. Pitt controlled the ball for over 10 minutes of the final quarter on a 68-yard drive to the 1-yard line. With 1 second remaining Pitt carried Coach Michelosen off the field. Penn State was adamant that they needed the 1-second. An incomplete pass ended the game.

Pitt gained 330 yards rushing. Fred Cox gained 129 yards on 12 carries, Jim Clemens gained 101 yards on 16 carries and Jim Cunningham gained 57 yards on 20 carries. Ivan Toncic completed 3 of 4 passes (all to Fred Cox) for 33 yards. Penn State gained 107 yards rushing and 104 yards passing by completing 8 of 21 passes.

The Pitt starting lineup for the game against Penn State was Mike Ditka (left end), Ken Montanari (left tackle), Regis Coustillac (left guard), Serafino Fazio (center), Larry Vignali (right guard), Dick Mills (right tackle), Ron Delfine (right end), Ivan Toncic (quarterback), Bob Clemens (left halfback), Fred Cox (right halfback) and Jim Cunningham (fullback). Substitutes appearing in the game for Pitt were Steve Jastrzembski, Ernie Westwood, Bill Lindner, Paul Hodge, Andy Kuzneski, Charles Marranca, David Walker, Bob Guzik, Dennis Dvorchak, Bob Rathi, David Kraus, Peter Prince, Andy Sepsi, Chuck Reinhold, Ray Tarasi, Joe Scisly, John Yaccino, Fred Riddle and Curt Plowman.

== Postseason ==
End Mike Ditka was named to the Central Press Association All-America third team.

On December 1, Frank Carver was named Athletic Director by Chancellor Edward Litchfield.

== Coaching staff ==
1959 Pittsburgh Panthers football staff
Coaching staff: John Michelosen – head coach; Jack Wiley – head line coach; Victor Fusia –backfield coach; Carl DePasqua –halfback coach (scout); Robert Timmons – defensive coach; Walter Cummins – center coach; Steve Petro – freshman coach; Lou Cecconi – freshmen coach	Support staff: Frank Carver– acting athletic director; Walter P. Cummins – assistant athletic director; Carroll Cook– athletic publicity director; Frank Carver – graduate manager; Howard Waite – trainer; Roger McGill – assistant trainer

== Roster ==
1959 Pittsburgh Panthers football roster
Player	Position	Games	Weight	Height	Class	Prep School	Hometown
Frank Boggs	halfback	0	185	6 ft	sophomore	Carrollton H. S.	Carrollton, OH
Robert Budavich	tackle	4	220	6 ft 4 in	sophomore	Mt. Lebanon H. S.	Castle Shannon, PA
Edwin Clark, Jr.	quarterback	0	170	5 ft 11 in	sophomore	Indiana H. S.	Indiana, PA
Bob Clemens*	halfback	9	188	6 ft	sophomore	West Mifflin H. S.	Munhall, PA
Al Corfield	guard	0	192	5 ft 11 in	junior	Sharpsburg H. S.	Sharpsburg, PA
Regis Coustillac*	guard	6	219	6 ft 2 in	sophomore	Ursuline H. S.	Youngstown, OH
Fred Cox*	halfback	10	188	5 ft 11 in	sophomore	Monongahela H. S.	Monongahela, PA
Jim Cunningham*	fullback	7	205	5 ft 11 in	junior	Connellsville H. S.	Connellsville, PA
Ron Delfine*	end	10	190	6 ft	junior	Canonsburg H. S.	Canonsburg, PA
Philip Diemert	tackle	0	223	6 ft	sophomore	North Catholic H. S.	Pittsburgh, PA
Mike Ditka*	end	10	208	6 ft 2 in	junior	Aliquippa H. S.	Aliquippa, PA
Dennis Dvorchak	guard	5	210	6 ft 2 in	sophomore	South Union H. S.	Uniontown, PA
Ron Dzadony	tackle	0	208	6 ft 2 in	senior	Stowe H. S.	Stowe Township, PA
John Elston	halfback	0	180	6 ft 1 in	sophomore	Bloomfield H. S.	Bloomfield, NJ
Serafino Fazio*	center	10	209	5 ft 11 in	senior	Coraopolis H. S.	Coraopolis, PA
Edmund Ferdinand	halfback	0	185	5 ft 10 in	sophomore	Hazleton-Fort Union H. S.	Hazleton, PA
William Fisher, Jr.	guard	0	212	6 ft 1 in	sophomore	Mt. Lebanon H. S.	Mt. Lebanon, PA
Ed Fornadel	tackle	3	220	6 ft 1 in	junior	Beaverdale H. S.	Beaverdale, PA
Michael Frasca	fullback	3	180	6 ft 1 in	sophomore	Altoona-Bullis H. S.	Altoona, PA
Bob Guzik*	guard	7	205	6 ft 2 in	sophomore	Cecil Twp. H. S.	Lawrence., PA
James Halferty	end	0	190	6 ft	sophomore	Latrobe H. S.	Latrobe, PA
Robert Hanak	center	0	190	6 ft	sophomore	Sharon H. S.	Sharon, PA
Heywood Haser	end	4	200	6 ft	sophomorer	New Kensington H. S.	New Kensington, PA
Paul Hodge*	center	9	205	6 ft 2 in	junior	Portage H. S.	Portage, PA
John Holzbach	guard	1	215	6 ft 3 in	sophomore	South. H. S.	Youngstown, OH
Stave Jaztrzembski*	end	10	193	6 ft 2 in	sophomore	Vandergrift H. S.	Vandergrift, PA
Andy Kasic	halfback	0	165	5 ft 10 in	sophomore	West Newton H. S.	West Newton, PA
John Kopp	guard	0	203	5 ft 10 in	sophomore	Ursuline H. S.	Struthers, OH
David Kraus*	quarterback	10	191	6 ft 2 in	sophomore	Tridelphia H. S.	Wheeling, WVA
John Kuprok	end	4	205	6 ft 1 in	sophomore	Duquesne H. S.	Duquesne, PA
Andrew Kuzneski*	center	9	206	6 ft 1 in	sophomore	Indiana H. S.	Indiana, PA
Bobby LaRue, Jr.	halfback	0	185	5 ft 10 in	sophomore	Mt. Lebanon-Kiski H. S.	Mt. Lebanon, PA
Joseph Latvis	end	1	185	6 ft	sophomore	Nashua H. S.	Nashua, NH
Mark Lenz	gtackle	0	215	6 ft 2 in	sophomore	Latrobe H. S.	Latrobe, PA
Bill Lindner*	tackle	10	215	6 ft 2 in	senior	Central Catholic H.S.	Pittsburgh, PA
Bob Longfellow*	guard	6	200	5 ft 11 in	senior	Freedom H.S.	Freedom, PA
Charles Marranca*	tackle	8	210	5 ft 11in	senior	Pittston H. S.	Pittston, PA
Dave Mastro	end	0	218	6 ft 5 in	sophomore	Baldwin H. S.	Baldwin, PA
Dick Matyus	center	6	220	6 ft 2 in	sophomore	Shannock Valley H. S.	Yatesboro, PA
Elmer Merkovsky, Jr.	tackle	0	225	6 ft 2 in	sophomore	Wilmerding H. S.	Wilmerding, PA
Dick Mills*	tackle	10	230	6 ft 3 in	junior	Beaver H. S.	Beaver, PA
Ken Montanari*	tackle	10	200	6 ft 1 in	senior	Plum H. S.	Plum Borough, PA
Leonard Mosser	hb/fb	0	181	6 ft 2 in	sophomore	Harrisville H. S.	Harrisville, WV
Bob Navalance	center	0	186	6 ft	senior	Ambridge H. S.	Ambridge, PA
Curt Plowman*	fullback	10	190	6 ft	senior	Altoona H. S.	Altoona, PA
Peter Prince	quarterback	2	175	5 ft 11 in	senior	Nashua H. S.	Nashua, NH
Bob Rathi*	end	9	195	6 ft 2 in	senior	Munhall H. S.	Elrama, PA
Chuck Reinhold*	halfback	10	173	6 ft 1 in	junior	Mt. Lebanon H. S.	Mt. Lebanon, PA
Fred Riddle*	fullback	9	195	6 ft	senior	Robinson Twp. H. S.	Robinson Twp., PA
John Sakal	quarterback	2	193	6 ft 2 in	sophomore	Aliquippa H. S.	Aliquippa, PA
Richard Sanker	quarterback	0	175	6 ft	sophomore	Johnstown Central H. S.	Johnstown, PA
Joe Scisly*	halfback	9	180	6 ft	senior	Danville H. S.	Elysburg, PA
James Scott, Jr.	center	0	210	5 ft 11 in	sophomore	Dormont H. S.	Dormont, PA
Frank Scrip	fullback	0	192	6 ft	sophomore	California. H. S.	Roscoe, PA
Norton Seaman*	guard	7	200	5 ft 10 in	senior	Hummelstown H. S.	Hummelstown, PA
Andy Sepsi*	halfback	9	192	5 ft 11 in	senior	Brownsville H. S.	Brownsville, PA
Henry Suffoletta	guard	0	210	5 ft 11 in	senior	Midland H. S.	Midland, PA
Ray Tarasi*	halfback	6	170	5 ft 10 in	sophomore	Springdale-Kiski H. S.	Harmarville, PA
Ivan Toncic*	quarterback	10	178	5 ft 11 in	senior	Midland H. S.	Midland, PA
Lawrence Vignali*	guard	10	218	5 ft 10 in	sophomore	Masontown H. S.	Masontown, PA
David Walker	end	9	215	6 ft 1 in	junior	Mt. Lebanon H. S.	Mt. Lebanon, PA
Ernie Westwood*	tackle	10	218	6 ft 2 in	senior	Clairton H. S.	Elrama, PA
John Yaccino*	halfback	8	177	5 ft 11 in	sophomore	Hazleton H.S.	Hazleton, PA
Harry Yoos	quarterback	0	170	5 ft 9 in	sophomore	Ambridge H. S.	Ambridg, PA
* Letterman

== Individual scoring summary ==
1959 Pittsburgh Panthers scoring summary
Player	Touchdowns	Extra points	Two pointers	Field goals	Safety	Points
Fred Cox	5	8	0	1	0	41
Mike Ditka	4	0	0	0	0	24
Jim Cunningham	4	0	0	0	0	24
Bob Clemens	2	0	0	0	0	12
Ron Delfine	1	0	0	0	1	8
Steve Jastrzembski	1	0	1	0	0	8
Ivan Toncic	1	0	0	0	0	6
Joe Scisly	1	0	0	0	0	6
Andy Sepsi	1	0	0	0	0	6
Dick Mills	1	0	0	0	0	6
Norton Seaman	0	2	0	1	0	5
John Yaccino	0	0	1	0	0	2
Totals	21	10	2	2	1	148

== Statistical leaders ==
Pittsburgh's individual statistical leaders for the 1959 season include those listed below.

=== Rushing ===
Player	Attempts	Net yards	Yards per attempt	Touchdowns
Fred Cox	47	392	8.3	5
Jim Cunningham	80	326	4.1	4
Joe Scisly	45	224	5.0	1
Chuck Reinhold	48	203	4.2	0

=== Passing ===
Player	Attempts	Completions	Interceptions	Comp %	Yards	Yds/Comp	TD
Ivan Toncic	133	56	13	71.0	667	11.9	8
Dave Kraus	11	4	2	28.6	46	11.5	0

=== Receiving ===
Player	Receptions	Yards	Yds/Recp	TD
Mike Ditka	16	249	15.5	4
Ron Delfine	7	67	9.6	1
John Kuprok	4	49	12.3	0

=== Kickoff returns ===
Player	Returns	Yards	Yds/Return	TD
Jim Cunningham	13	288	22.2	0
John Yaccino	6	134	22.3	0
Fred Riddle	4	106	26.5	0

=== Punt returns ===
Player	Returns	Yards	Yds/Return	TD
Jim Cunningham	8	61	7.6	0
Bob Clemens	5	93	18.6	0
Chuck Reinhold	4	45	11.2	0
