= 1959 Villanova Wildcats football team =

American college football season

1959 Villanova Wildcats football
- Conference: Independent
- Record: 1–9
- Head coach: Frank Reagan (6th season; first 4 games); Joseph Rogers (interim; final 6 games)
- Captains: William Craig; Edward Lemkin; Frank Cappelletti
- Home stadium: Villanova Stadium

1959 Eastern major college football independents records
	Conf.			Overall
Team	W	L	T	W		L		T
No. 1 Syracuse		–		11	–	0	–	0
No. 12 Penn State		–		9	–	2	–	0
Holy Cross		–		6	–	4	–	0
No. 20 Pittsburgh		–		6	–	4	–	0
Boston College		–		5	–	4	–	0
Army		–		4	–	4	–	1
Boston University		–		4	–	5	–	0
Colgate		–		2	–	7	–	0
Villanova		–		1	–	9	–	0
Rankings from AP poll

The 1959 Villanova Wildcats football team represented the Villanova University during the 1959 college football season. The head coach was Frank Regan who left the team after the first four games of the season and Joseph Rogers finished the season. The team played their home games at Villanova Stadium in Villanova, Pennsylvania.

== Schedule ==
Date	Opponent	Site	Result	Attendance	Source
September 19	West Chester	Villanova Stadium; Villanova, PA	L 7–13	14,000	
September 27	at Xavier	Xavier Stadium; Cincinnati, OH	L 20–48	8,918	
October 3	at Holy Cross	Fitton Field; Worcester, MA	L 0–20	8,000	
October 10	at Boston College	Alumni Stadium; Chestnut Hill, MA	L 6–39	13,000	
October 17	at No. 5 Miami (OH)	Miami Field; Oxford, OH	L 6–26	10,000	
October 24	Virginia Tech	Villanova Stadium; Villanova, PA	L 14–24	7,965	
October 31	Dayton	Villanova Stadium; Villanova, PA	W 22–13	6,875	
November 7	at Army	Michie Stadium; West Point, NY	L 0–14	21,500	
November 14	at Rutgers	Rutgers Stadium; New Brunswick, NJ	L 6–12	14,500	
November 21	at Detroit	University of Detroit Stadium; Detroit, MI	L 6–40	10,365	
Rankings from UPI Poll released prior to the game
