= 1959 Army Cadets football team =

American college football season

1959 Army Cadets football
- Conference: Independent
- Record: 4–4–1
- Head coach: Dale Hall (1st season)
- Captain: Bill Carpenter
- Home stadium: Michie Stadium

1959 Eastern major college football independents records
	Conf.			Overall
Team	W	L	T	W		L		T
No. 1 Syracuse		–		11	–	0	–	0
No. 12 Penn State		–		9	–	2	–	0
Holy Cross		–		6	–	4	–	0
No. 20 Pittsburgh		–		6	–	4	–	0
Boston College		–		5	–	4	–	0
Army		–		4	–	4	–	1
Boston University		–		4	–	5	–	0
Colgate		–		2	–	7	–	0
Villanova		–		1	–	9	–	0
Rankings from AP poll

The 1959 Army Cadets football team represented the United States Military Academy as an independent during the 1959 college football season. In their first year under head coach Dale Hall, the Cadets compiled a 4–4–1 record and outscored all opponents by a combined total of 174 to 141. In the annual Army–Navy Game, the Cadets lost 43–12 to the Midshipmen. The Cadets also lost to Illinois, Penn State, and Oklahoma.

Army end Bill Carpenter was a consensus first-team player on the 1959 College Football All-America Team.

== Schedule ==
Date	Time	Opponent	Rank	Site	TV	Result	Attendance	Source
September 26		Boston College	No. 7	Michie Stadium; West Point, NY		W 44–8	22,500	
October 3		at Illinois	No. 4	Memorial Stadium; Champaign, IL		L 14–20	64,891	
October 10		No. 16 Penn State		Michie Stadium; West Point, NY		L 11–17	27,500	
October 17		at Duke		Duke Stadium; Durham, NC		W 21–6	33,500	
October 24		Colorado State		Michie Stadium; West Point, NY		W 25–6	19,950	
October 31	1:45 p.m.	vs. Air Force		Yankee Stadium; Bronx, NY (rivalry)	NBC	T 13–13	67,000	
November 7		Villanova		Michie Stadium; West Point, NY		W 14–0	21,500	
November 14		at Oklahoma		Oklahoma Memorial Stadium; Norman, OK		L 20–28	61,718–62,472	
November 28	1:15 p.m.	vs. Navy		Philadelphia Municipal Stadium; Philadelphia, PA (Army–Navy Game)	NBC	L 12–43	100,000–102,000	
Rankings from AP Poll released prior to the game; All times are in Eastern time

== Roster ==
1959 Army Cadets football team roster
Players			Coaches
Offense: Pos. / # / Name / Class; QB / / Joe Caldwell / Sr	Defense: Pos. / # / Name / Class	Special teams: Pos. / # / Name / Class	Head coach: Dale Hall; Coordinators/assistant coaches Legend: (C) Team captain; (S) Suspended; (I) Ineligible; Injured; Redshirt
