= 1959 Dartmouth Indians football team =

American college football season

1959 Dartmouth Indians football
- Conference: Ivy League
- Record: 5–3–1 (5–1–1 Ivy)
- Head coach: Bob Blackman (5th season)
- Captain: William Gundy
- Home stadium: Memorial Field

1959 Ivy League football standings
	Conf.					Overall
Team	W		L		T	W		L		T
Penn $	6	–	1	–	0	7	–	1	–	1
Dartmouth	5	–	1	–	1	5	–	3	–	1
Harvard	4	–	3	–	0	6	–	3	–	0
Yale	4	–	3	–	0	6	–	3	–	0
Cornell	3	–	4	–	0	5	–	4	–	0
Princeton	3	–	4	–	0	4	–	5	–	0
Brown	1	–	5	–	1	2	–	6	–	1
Columbia	1	–	6	–	0	2	–	7	–	0
$ – Conference champion

The 1959 Dartmouth Indians football team was an American football team that represented Dartmouth College during the 1959 college football season. After winning the Ivy League championship in 1958, Dartmouth finished second in 1959.

In their fifth season under head coach Bob Blackman, the Indians compiled a 5–3–1 record and outscored opponents 106 to 96. William Gundy was the team captain.

The Indians' 5–1–1 conference record was the second-best in the Ivy League. They outscored Ivy opponents 76 to 40.

Dartmouth played its home games at Memorial Field on the college campus in Hanover, New Hampshire.

== Schedule ==
Date	Opponent	Site	Result	Attendance	Source
September 26	Holy Cross*	Memorial Field; Hanover, NH	L 8–31	13,000	
October 3	at Penn	Franklin Field; Philadelphia, PA	L 0–13	16,184	
October 10	Brown	Memorial Field; Hanover, NH	T 0–0	20,196	
October 17	at Boston College*	Alumni Stadium; Chestnut Hill, MA	L 12–35	17,000	
October 24	at Harvard	Harvard Stadium; Boston, MA (rivalry)	W 9–0	20,000	
October 31	at Yale	Yale Bowl; New Haven, CT	W 12–8	42,741	
November 7	at Columbia	Baker Field; New York, NY	W 22–0	5,000	
November 14	Cornell	Memorial Field; Hanover, NH (rivalry)	W 21–12	11,000	
November 21	at Princeton	Palmer Stadium; Princeton, NJ	W 12–7	30,000	
*Non-conference game
