= 1959 Holy Cross Crusaders football team =

American college football season

1959 Holy Cross Crusaders football
- Conference: Independent
- Record: 6–4
- Head coach: Eddie Anderson (16th season)
- Captain: Charles Pacunas
- Home stadium: Fitton Field

1959 Eastern major college football independents records
	Conf.			Overall
Team	W	L	T	W		L		T
No. 1 Syracuse		–		11	–	0	–	0
No. 12 Penn State		–		9	–	2	–	0
Holy Cross		–		6	–	4	–	0
No. 20 Pittsburgh		–		6	–	4	–	0
Boston College		–		5	–	4	–	0
Army		–		4	–	4	–	1
Boston University		–		4	–	5	–	0
Colgate		–		2	–	7	–	0
Villanova		–		1	–	9	–	0
Rankings from AP poll

The 1959 Holy Cross Crusaders football team was an American football team that represented the College of the Holy Cross as an independent during the 1959 college football season. Eddie Anderson returned for the 10th consecutive year as head coach, his 16th year overall. The team compiled a record of 6–4.

== Schedule ==
All home games were played at Fitton Field on the Holy Cross campus in Worcester, Massachusetts.

Date	Opponent	Site	Result	Attendance	Source
September 26	at Dartmouth	Memorial Field; Hanover, NH	W 31–8	13,000	
October 3	Villanova	Fitton Field; Worcester, MA	W 20–0	8,000	
October 10	Dayton^	Fitton Field; Worcester, MA	W 8–0	8,000	
October 17	at Syracuse	Archbold Stadium; Syracuse, NY	L 6–42	30,000	
October 24	at Columbia	Baker Field; New York, NY	W 34–0	6,000	
October 31	Colgate^{†}	Fitton Field; Worcester, MA	W 14–12	6,000	
November 7	Boston University	Fitton Field; Worcester, MA	W 17–8	10,000	
November 14	at Penn State	New Beaver Field; State College, PA	L 0–46	20,000	
November 21	at Marquette	Marquette Stadium; Milwaukee, WI	L 12–30	12,136	
November 28	Boston College	Fitton Field; Worcester, MA (rivalry)	L 0–14	23,000	
^{†}Homecoming; ^ Family Weekend

== Statistical leaders ==
Statistical leaders for the 1959 Crusaders included:

- Rushing: Richard Skinner, 528 yards and 3 touchdowns on 116 attempts
- Passing: Ken Komodzinski, 677 yards, 38 completions and 3 touchdowns on 111 attempts
- Receiving: Bernie Buzyniski, 317 yards and 1 touchdown on 17 receptions
- Scoring: Richard Skinner, 18 points on 3 touchdowns
- Total offense: Ken Komodzinski, 681 yards (677 passing, 4 rushing)
- All-purpose yards: Richard Skinner, 600 yards (528 rushing, 72 receiving)
