= 1959 Arizona Wildcats football team =

American college football season

1959 Arizona Wildcats football
- Conference: Border Conference
- Record: 4–6 (2–1 Border)
- Head coach: Jim LaRue (1st season)
- Captains: Gary Cropper; Jim Geist
- Home stadium: Arizona Stadium

1959 Border Conference football standings
| | Conf. | | | | | Overall |
| Team | W | | L | | T | W | | L | | T |
|---|---|---|---|---|---|---|---|---|---|---|
| Arizona State $ | 5 | – | 0 | – | 0 | 10 | – | 1 | – | 0 |
| Arizona | 2 | – | 1 | – | 0 | 4 | – | 6 | – | 0 |
| New Mexico State | 2 | – | 2 | – | 0 | 8 | – | 3 | – | 0 |
| Hardin–Simmons | 2 | – | 2 | – | 0 | 3 | – | 7 | – | 0 |
| Texas Western | 2 | – | 3 | – | 0 | 3 | – | 7 | – | 0 |
| West Texas State | 0 | – | 5 | – | 0 | 1 | – | 9 | – | 0 |
$ – Conference champion

The 1959 Arizona Wildcats football team represented the University of Arizona in the Border Conference during the 1959 college football season. In their first season under head coach Jim LaRue, the Wildcats compiled a 4–6 record (2–1 against Border opponents) and were outscored by their opponents, 211 to 118. The team captains were Gary Cropper and Jim Geist. The team played home games in Arizona Stadium in Tucson, Arizona.

The team's statistical leaders included Eddie Wilson with 476 passing yards, Warren Livingston with 380 rushing yards, and Willie Peete with 173 receiving yards.

== Schedule ==
| Date | Time | Opponent | Site | Result | Attendance | Source |
|---|---|---|---|---|---|---|
| September 19 | | BYU* | Arizona Stadium; Tucson, AZ | L 14–18 | 22,000 | |
| September 26 | 7:00 p.m. | at West Texas State | Buffalo Bowl; Canyon, TX | W 7–6 | 11,000 | |
| October 3 | | Idaho* | Arizona Stadium; Tucson, AZ | W 16–14 | 19,500 | |
| October 17 | | New Mexico* | Arizona Stadium; Tucson, AZ | L 7–28 | 25,500 | |
| October 24 | | Colorado* | Arizona Stadium; Tucson, AZ | L 0–18 | 21,000 | |
| October 31 | | at Utah* | Ute Stadium; Salt Lake City, UT | L 6–54 | 10,063 | |
| November 7 | | Texas Tech* | Arizona Stadium; Tucson, AZ | W 30–26 | 14,500 | |
| November 14 | | at Air Force* | Folsom Field; Boulder, CO | L 15–22 | 8,500 | |
| November 21 | | Texas Western | Arizona Stadium; Tucson, AZ | W 14–10 | 20,000 | |
| November 28 | | at Arizona State | Sun Devil Stadium; Tempe, AZ (rivalry) | L 9–15 | 32,300 | |
*Non-conference game; All times are in Mountain time
