= 1959 Arizona State Sun Devils football team =

American college football season

1959 Arizona State Sun Devils football

Border champion
- Conference: Border Conference
- Record: 10–1 (5–0 Border)
- Head coach: Frank Kush (2nd season)
- Home stadium: Sun Devil Stadium

1959 Border Conference football standings
	Conf.					Overall
Team	W		L		T	W		L		T
Arizona State $	5	–	0	–	0	10	–	1	–	0
Arizona	2	–	1	–	0	4	–	6	–	0
New Mexico State	2	–	2	–	0	8	–	3	–	0
Hardin–Simmons	2	–	2	–	0	3	–	7	–	0
Texas Western	2	–	3	–	0	3	–	7	–	0
West Texas State	0	–	5	–	0	1	–	9	–	0
$ – Conference champion

The 1959 Arizona State Sun Devils football team was an American football team that represented Arizona State University in the Border Conference during the 1959 college football season. In their second season under head coach Frank Kush, the Sun Devils compiled a 10–1 record (5–0 against Border opponents), won the conferenceb championship and outscored their opponents by a combined total of 272 to 150.

The team's statistical leaders included Frank Urban with 536 passing yards, Nolan Jones with 689 rushing yards, and Bob Rembert with 232 receiving yards. Joe Camut scored 2 TDs (1 Rushing/1 Receiving) for the team during the season with a 3.5 yards per carry and 9 yards per reception average.

== Schedule ==
Date	Opponent	Site	Result	Attendance	Source
September 19	West Texas State	Sun Devil Stadium; Tempe, AZ	W 43–22	25,200	
September 26	Utah State*	Sun Devil Stadium; Tempe, AZ	W 34–12	25,300	
October 3	No. 6 Montana State*	Sun Devil Stadium; Tempe, AZ	W 31–14	22,600	
October 17	at Colorado State*	Colorado Field; Fort Collins, CO	W 24–9	9,600	
October 24	at San Jose State*	Spartan Stadium; San Jose, CA	L 15–24	14,000	
October 31	New Mexico State	Sun Devil Stadium; Tempe, AZ	W 35–31	21,000	
November 7	at Texas Western	Kidd Field; El Paso, TX	W 20–7	8,500	
November 14	BYU*	Sun Devil Stadium; Tempe, AZ	W 27–8	25,200	
November 21	Hardin–Simmons	Sun Devil Stadium; Tempe, AZ	W 14–8	25,400	
November 28	Arizona	Sun Devil Stadium; Tempe, AZ (rivalry)	W 15–9	32,300	
December 4	at Hawaii*	Honolulu Stadium; Honolulu, HI	W 14–6	8,000	
*Non-conference game; Rankings from UPI Poll released prior to the game
