= 1959 Texas Western Miners football team =

American college football season

1959 Texas Western Miners football
- Conference: Border Conference
- Record: 3–7 (2–3 Border)
- Head coach: Ben Collins (3rd season)
- Home stadium: Kidd Field

1959 Border Conference football standings
	Conf.					Overall
Team	W		L		T	W		L		T
Arizona State $	5	–	0	–	0	10	–	1	–	0
Arizona	2	–	1	–	0	4	–	6	–	0
New Mexico State	2	–	2	–	0	8	–	3	–	0
Hardin–Simmons	2	–	2	–	0	3	–	7	–	0
Texas Western	2	–	3	–	0	3	–	7	–	0
West Texas State	0	–	5	–	0	1	–	9	–	0
$ – Conference champion

The 1959 Texas Western Miners football team was an American football team that represented Texas Western College (now known as University of Texas at El Paso) as a member of the Border Conference during the 1959 college football season. In its third season under head coach Ben Collins, the team compiled a 3–7 record (2–3 against Border Conference opponents), finished fifth in the conference, and was outscored by a total of 191 to 163.

== Schedule ==
Date	Opponent	Site	Result	Attendance	Source
September 19	UNAM*	Kidd Field; El Paso, TX	W 43–8	11,000	
September 26	North Texas State	Kidd Field; El Paso, TX	L 7–31	8,000	
October 3	at New Mexico*	Zimmerman Field; Albuquerque, NM	L 7–17		
October 10	West Texas State	Kidd Field; El Paso, TX	W 13–12	7,000	
October 17	at Trinity (TX)	Alamo Stadium; San Antonio, TX	L 20–21	2,553	
October 24	New Mexico A&M^{†}	Kidd Field; El Paso, TX (rivalry)	W 20–15	13,000	
October 31	at Hardin–Simmons	Public Schools Stadium; Abilene, TX	L 14–25	5,000	
November 7	Arizona State	Kidd Field; El Paso, TX	L 7–20	8,500	
November 14	Abilene Christian*	Kidd Field; El Paso, TX	L 22–28	5,000	
November 21	at Arizona	Arizona Stadium; Tucson, AZ	L 0–14	20,000	
*Non-conference game; ^{†}Homecoming
