= 1959 Boston University Terriers football team =

American college football season

1959 Boston University Terriers football
- Conference: Independent
- Record: 4–5
- Head coach: Steve Sinko (3rd season)
- Home stadium: Boston University Field

1959 Eastern major college football independents records
	Conf.			Overall
Team	W	L	T	W		L		T
No. 1 Syracuse		–		11	–	0	–	0
No. 12 Penn State		–		9	–	2	–	0
Holy Cross		–		6	–	4	–	0
No. 20 Pittsburgh		–		6	–	4	–	0
Boston College		–		5	–	4	–	0
Army		–		4	–	4	–	1
Boston University		–		4	–	5	–	0
Colgate		–		2	–	7	–	0
Villanova		–		1	–	9	–	0
Rankings from AP poll

The 1959 Boston University Terriers football team was an American football team that represented Boston University as an independent during the 1959 college football season. In its third season under head coach Steve Sinko, the team compiled a 4–5 record and was outscored by a total of 150 to 102.

== Schedule ==
Date	Opponent	Site	Result	Attendance	Source
September 25	George Washington	Boston University Field; Boston, MA	L 14–18	14,000	
October 3	at Kansas	Memorial Stadium; Lawrence, KS	L 7–28	20,000	
October 9	West Virginia	Boston University Field; Boston, MA	W 7–0	8,500	
October 17	at No. 10 Penn State	New Beaver Field; University Park, PA	L 12–21	25,000	
October 23	Connecticut	Boston University Field; Boston, MA	W 8–7	5,800	
October 31	at UMass	Alumni Field; Amherst, MA	W 20–6	2,896	
November 7	at Holy Cross	Fitton Field; Worcester, MA	L 8–17	10,000	
November 14	Boston College	Boston University Field; Boston, MA (rivalry)	W 26–7	21,000	
November 21	No. 1 Syracuse	Boston University Field; Boston, MA	L 0–46	22,000	
Rankings from AP Poll released prior to the game
