= 1959 Harvard Crimson football team =

American college football season

1959 Harvard Crimson football
- Conference: Ivy League
- Record: 6–3 (4–3 Ivy)
- Head coach: John Yovicsin (3rd season)
- Captain: Harold J. Keohane
- Home stadium: Harvard Stadium

1959 Ivy League football standings
	Conf.					Overall
Team	W		L		T	W		L		T
Penn $	6	–	1	–	0	7	–	1	–	1
Dartmouth	5	–	1	–	1	5	–	3	–	1
Harvard	4	–	3	–	0	6	–	3	–	0
Yale	4	–	3	–	0	6	–	3	–	0
Cornell	3	–	4	–	0	5	–	4	–	0
Princeton	3	–	4	–	0	4	–	5	–	0
Brown	1	–	5	–	1	2	–	6	–	1
Columbia	1	–	6	–	0	2	–	7	–	0
$ – Conference champion

The 1959 Harvard Crimson football team was an American football team that represented Harvard University during the 1959 college football season. Harvard tied for third place in the Ivy League.

In their third year under head coach John Yovicsin, the Crimson compiled a 6–3 record and outscored opponents 177 to 101. Harold J. Keohane was the team captain.

Harvard's 4–3 conference record placed tied for third-best in the Ivy League. The Crimson outscored Ivy opponents 121 to 73.

Harvard played its home games at Harvard Stadium in the Allston neighborhood of Boston, Massachusetts.

== Schedule ==
Date	Opponent	Site	Result	Attendance	Source
September 26	Massachusetts*	Harvard Stadium; Boston, MA	W 36–22	11,500	
October 3	Bucknell*	Harvard Stadium; Boston, MA	W 20–6	9,000	
October 10	Cornell	Harvard Stadium; Boston, MA	L 16–20	15,000	
October 17	Columbia	Harvard Stadium; Boston, MA	W 38–22	12,000	
October 24	Dartmouth	Harvard Stadium; Boston, MA (rivalry)	L 0–9	20,000	
October 31	at Penn	Franklin Field; Philadelphia, PA (rivalry)	W 12–0	15,660	
November 7	at Princeton	Harvard Stadium; Boston, MA (rivalry)	W 14–0	20,000	
November 14	at Brown	Brown Stadium; Providence, RI	L 6–16	15,000	
November 21	at Yale	Yale Bowl; New Haven, CT (The Game)	W 35–6	66,053	
*Non-conference game
