= 1959 Syracuse Orangemen football team =

American college football season

1959 Syracuse Orangemen football

Consensus national champion Eastern champion Cotton Bowl Classic champion

Cotton Bowl Classic, W 23–14 vs. Texas
- Conference: Independent

Ranking
- Coaches: No. 1
- AP: No. 1
- Record: 11–0
- Head coach: Ben Schwartzwalder (11th season)
- Captain: Gerhard Schwedes
- Home stadium: Archbold Stadium

1959 Eastern major college football independents records
	Conf.			Overall
Team	W	L	T	W		L		T
No. 1 Syracuse		–		11	–	0	–	0
No. 12 Penn State		–		9	–	2	–	0
Holy Cross		–		6	–	4	–	0
No. 20 Pittsburgh		–		6	–	4	–	0
Boston College		–		5	–	4	–	0
Army		–		4	–	4	–	1
Boston University		–		4	–	5	–	0
Colgate		–		2	–	7	–	0
Villanova		–		1	–	9	–	0
Rankings from AP poll

The 1959 Syracuse Orangemen football team represented Syracuse University in Syracuse, New York, as an independent during the 1959 college football season. Led by eleventh-year head coach Ben Schwartzwalder, the independent Orangemen were undefeated and won the school's only national championship in football, topping the rankings by wide margins in the final polls in early December.

They met fourth-ranked Texas in the Cotton Bowl Classic in Dallas on New Year's Day. They led 15–0 at halftime and 23–6 after the three quarters. Texas scored midway through the fourth quarter to draw to 23–14, but there was no further scoring, and Syracuse gained its first bowl win. Unranked at the start of the season, Syracuse finished with an 11–0 record with five shutouts, and outscored its opponents 413–73.

Notable players included sophomore running back Ernie Davis, winner of the Heisman Trophy in 1961 and the first selection of the 1962 NFL draft. In the Cotton Bowl Classic, he scored the first two touchdowns and threw a pass to Gerhard Schwedes for the third. Davis was helped by an offensive line that included unanimous first team All-American guard Roger Davis.

The team was named national champion by AP, Billingsley, Boand, DeVold, Football News, Football Research, Football Writers, Helms, Litkenhous, NCF, NFF, Poling, Sagarin (ELO-Chess), UPI, and Williamson, leading to a consensus national champion designation.

== Schedule ==
Date	Opponent	Rank	Site	Result	Attendance	Source
September 26	Kansas		Archbold Stadium; Syracuse, NY	W 35–21	25,000	
October 3	Maryland	No. 20	Archbold Stadium; Syracuse, NY	W 29–0	30,000	
October 10	vs. Navy	No. 12	Foreman Field; Norfolk, VA (Oyster Bowl)	W 32–6	31,700	
October 17	Holy Cross	No. 8	Archbold Stadium; Syracuse, NY	W 42–6	30,000	
October 24	West Virginia	No. 6	Archbold Stadium; Syracuse, NY	W 44–0	35,000	
October 31	at Pittsburgh	No. 5	Pitt Stadium; Pittsburgh, PA	W 35–0	25,761	
November 7	at No. 7 Penn State	No. 4	New Beaver Field; University Park, PA	W 20–18	32,800–34,000	
November 14	Colgate	No. 1	Archbold Stadium; Syracuse, NY	W 71–0	31,000	
November 21	at Boston University	No. 1	Boston University Field; Boston, MA	W 46–0	22,000	
December 5	at No. 17 UCLA	No. 1	Los Angeles Memorial Coliseum; Los Angeles, CA	W 36–8	46,436–46,557	
January 1, 1960	vs. No. 4 Texas	No. 1	Cotton Bowl; Dallas, TX (Cotton Bowl Classic)	W 23–14	75,504	
Rankings from AP Poll released prior to the game; Source:

== Game summaries ==
=== Vs. No. 4 Texas (Cotton Bowl Classic) ===
Team	1	2	3	4	Total
• No. 1 Orangemen	7	8	8	0	23
No. 4 Longhorns	0	0	6	8	14

- Date: January 1
- Location: Cotton Bowl, Dallas, Texas
- Game attendance: 98,202
- Television network: CBS

== 1960 NFL draft ==
Player	Position	Round	Pick	NFL club
Roger Davis	Guard	1	7	Chicago Bears
Gerhard Schwedes	Running back	4	47	Baltimore Colts
Bob Yates	Tackle	7	84	New York Giants
Dave Baker	End	17	204	New York Giants
