= 1959 Boston College Eagles football team =

American college football season

1959 Boston College Eagles football
- Conference: Independent
- Record: 5–4
- Head coach: Mike Holovak (9th season)
- Captain: Frank Casey
- Home stadium: Alumni Stadium

1959 Eastern major college football independents records
	Conf.			Overall
Team	W	L	T	W		L		T
No. 1 Syracuse		–		11	–	0	–	0
No. 12 Penn State		–		9	–	2	–	0
Holy Cross		–		6	–	4	–	0
No. 20 Pittsburgh		–		6	–	4	–	0
Boston College		–		5	–	4	–	0
Army		–		4	–	4	–	1
Boston University		–		4	–	5	–	0
Colgate		–		2	–	7	–	0
Villanova		–		1	–	9	–	0
Rankings from AP poll

The 1959 Boston College Eagles football team represented Boston College as an independent during the 1959 college football season. The Eagles were led by ninth-year head coach Mike Holovak and played their home games at Alumni Stadium in Chestnut Hill, Massachusetts. At the conclusion of a 5–4 season, Holovak was fired as head coach. He posted a record of 49–29–3 in his nine seasons at Boston College.

== Schedule ==
Date	Opponent	Site	Result	Attendance	Source
September 19	Navy	Alumni Stadium; Chestnut Hill, MA	L 8–24	23,000	
September 26	at No. 7 Army	Michie Stadium; West Point, NY	L 8–44	22,500	
October 10	Villanova	Alumni Stadium; Chestnut Hill, MA	W 39–6	13,000	
October 17	Dartmouth	Alumni Stadium; Chestnut Hill, MA	W 35–12	17,000	
October 25	Marquette	Alumni Stadium; Chestnut Hill, MA	W 16–0	17,000	
October 30	at Detroit	University of Detroit Stadium; Detroit, MI	W 21–9	15,305	
November 7	Pittsburgh	Alumni Stadium; Chestnut Hill, MA	L 14–22	13,000	
November 14	at Boston University	Boston University Field; Boston, MA (rivalry)	L 7–26	21,000	
November 28	at Holy Cross	Fitton Field; Worcester, MA (rivalry)	W 14–0	23,000	
Rankings from AP Poll released prior to the game
