= 1959 Cornell Big Red football team =

American college football season

1959 Cornell Big Red football
- Conference: Ivy League
- Record: 5–4 (3–4 Ivy)
- Head coach: George K. James (13th season)
- Captain: Dave Feeney
- Home stadium: Schoellkopf Field

1959 Ivy League football standings
	Conf.					Overall
Team	W		L		T	W		L		T
Penn $	6	–	1	–	0	7	–	1	–	1
Dartmouth	5	–	1	–	1	5	–	3	–	1
Harvard	4	–	3	–	0	6	–	3	–	0
Yale	4	–	3	–	0	6	–	3	–	0
Cornell	3	–	4	–	0	5	–	4	–	0
Princeton	3	–	4	–	0	4	–	5	–	0
Brown	1	–	5	–	1	2	–	6	–	1
Columbia	1	–	6	–	0	2	–	7	–	0
$ – Conference champion

The 1959 Cornell Big Red football team was an American football team that represented Cornell University during the 1959 college football season. Cornell tied for fifth place in the Ivy League .

In its 13th season under head coach George K. James, the team compiled a 5–4 record and outscored opponents 136 to 110. Dave Feeney was the team captain.

Cornell's 3–4 conference record tied for fifth place in the Ivy League. The Big Red was outscored 115 to 77 by Ivy opponents.

Cornell played its home games at Schoellkopf Field in Ithaca, New York.

== Schedule ==
Date	Opponent	Site	Result	Attendance	Source
September 26	at Colgate*	Colgate Athletic Field; Hamilton, NY (rivalry)	W 20–15	10,000	
October 3	Lehigh*	Schoellkopf Field; Ithaca, NY	W 13–6	10,000	
October 10	at Harvard	Harvard Stadium; Boston, MA	W 20–16	15,000	
October 17	Yale	Schoellkopf Field; Ithaca, NY	L 0–23	20,000	
October 24	at Princeton	Palmer Stadium; Princeton, NJ	L 0–20	22,000	
October 31	Columbia	Schoellkopf Field; Ithaca, NY (rivalry)	W 13–7	8,500	
November 7	Brown	Schoellkopf Field; Ithaca, NY	W 19–0	8,000	
November 14	at Dartmouth	Memorial Field; Hanover, NH (rivalry)	L 12–21	11,000	
November 26	at Penn	Franklin Field; Philadelphia, PA (rivalry)	L 13–28	23,661	
*Non-conference game
