= 1959 New Mexico State Aggies football team =

American college football season

1959 New Mexico State Aggies football

Sun Bowl champion

Sun Bowl, W 28–8 vs. North Texas State
- Conference: Border Conference
- Record: 8–3 (2–2 Border)
- Head coach: Warren B. Woodson (2nd season)
- Home stadium: Memorial Stadium

1959 Border Conference football standings
	Conf.					Overall
Team	W		L		T	W		L		T
Arizona State $	5	–	0	–	0	10	–	1	–	0
Arizona	2	–	1	–	0	4	–	6	–	0
New Mexico State	2	–	2	–	0	8	–	3	–	0
Hardin–Simmons	2	–	2	–	0	3	–	7	–	0
Texas Western	2	–	3	–	0	3	–	7	–	0
West Texas State	0	–	5	–	0	1	–	9	–	0
$ – Conference champion

The 1959 New Mexico State Aggies football team represented New Mexico State University in the Border Conference during the 1959 college football season. In their second year under head coach Warren B. Woodson, the Aggies compiled an 8–3 record (2–2 against conference opponents), finished in third place in the conference, and defeated North Texas State in the 1959 Sun Bowl.

The team's statistical leaders included Charley Johnson with 1,449 passing yards, Pervis Atkins with 971 rushing yards, and R. Cassell with 519 receiving yards. For the first time in what proved to be four consecutive years, a New Mexico State back won the NCAA rushing title, Pervis Atkins in 1959, Bob Gaiters in 1960, and Preacher Pilot in 1961 and 1962.

Woodson was later inducted into the College Football Hall of Fame.

== Schedule ==
Date	Opponent	Site	Result	Attendance	Source
September 12	Arizona State–Flagstaff*	Memorial Stadium; Las Cruces, NM	W 35–0	7,000	
September 19	at New Mexico	Zimmerman Field; Albuquerque, NM (rivalry)	W 29–12	17,500	
September 26	at Tulsa*	Skelly Field; Tulsa, OK	L 27–28	12,000–14,500	
October 3	McMurry*	Memorial Stadium; Las Cruces, NM	W 43–11		
October 10	at Trinity (TX)*	San Antonio, TX	W 20–18		
October 24	at Texas Western	Kidd Field; El Paso, TX (rivalry)	L 15–20	13,000	
October 31	at Arizona State	Sun Devil Stadium; Tempe, AZ	L 31–35	21,000	
November 14	Hardin–Simmons	Memorial Stadium; Las Cruces, NM	W 42–13	4,100	
November 21	West Texas State ^{†}	Memorial Stadium; Las Cruces, NM	W 35–13	7,000	
November 28	at University of Mexico*	Mexico City, Mexico	W 55–0		
December 31	vs. North Texas State*	Kidd Field; El Paso, TX (Sun Bowl)	W 28–8	14,000	
*Non-conference game; ^{†}Homecoming
