= 1959 Penn Quakers football team =

American college football season

1959 Penn Quakers football

Ivy League champion
- Conference: Ivy League
- Record: 7–1–1 (6–1 Ivy)
- Head coach: Steve Sebo (6th season)
- Captain: Barney Berlinger
- Home stadium: Franklin Field

1959 Ivy League football standings
	Conf.					Overall
Team	W		L		T	W		L		T
Penn $	6	–	1	–	0	7	–	1	–	1
Dartmouth	5	–	1	–	1	5	–	3	–	1
Harvard	4	–	3	–	0	6	–	3	–	0
Yale	4	–	3	–	0	6	–	3	–	0
Cornell	3	–	4	–	0	5	–	4	–	0
Princeton	3	–	4	–	0	4	–	5	–	0
Brown	1	–	5	–	1	2	–	6	–	1
Columbia	1	–	6	–	0	2	–	7	–	0
$ – Conference champion

The 1959 Penn Quakers football team was an American football team that represented the University of Pennsylvania during the 1959 college football season. Penn was named champion of the Ivy League.

In their sixth and final year under head coach Steve Sebo, the Quakers compiled a 7–1–1 record and outscored opponents 195 to 74. Barney Berlinger was the team captain.

Penn's 6–1 conference record was the best in the Ivy League, earning the conference championship. The Quakers outscored their Ivy opponents 147 to 52.

Penn played its home games at Franklin Field adjacent to the university's campus in Philadelphia, Pennsylvania.

== Schedule ==
Date	Opponent	Site	Result	Attendance	Source
September 26	Lafayette*	Franklin Field; Philadelphia, PA	W 26–0	15,974	
October 3	Dartmouth	Franklin Field; Philadelphia, PA	W 13–0	16,184	
October 10	at Princeton	Palmer Stadium; Princeton, NJ (rivalry)	W 18–0	32,000	
October 17	Brown	Franklin Field; Philadelphia, PA	W 36–9	13,083	
October 24	Navy*	Franklin Field; Philadelphia, PA	T 22–22	25,696	
October 31	Harvard	Franklin Field; Philadelphia, PA (rivalry)	L 0–12	15,660	
November 7	Yale	Franklin Field; Philadelphia, PA	W 28–12	25,102	
November 14	at Columbia	Baker Field; New York, NY	W 24–6	46,000	
November 26	Cornell	Franklin Field; Philadelphia, PA (rivalry)	W 28–13	23,661	
*Non-conference game
