= 1959 Colgate Red Raiders football team =

American college football season

1959 Colgate Red Raiders football
- Conference: Independent
- Record: 2–7
- Head coach: Alva Kelley (1st season)
- Captain: Joseph Wignot
- Home stadium: Colgate Athletic Field

1959 Eastern major college football independents records
| | Conf. | | | Overall |
| Team | W | L | T | W | | L | | T |
|---|---|---|---|---|---|---|---|---|
| No. 1 Syracuse | | – | | 11 | – | 0 | – | 0 |
| No. 12 Penn State | | – | | 9 | – | 2 | – | 0 |
| Holy Cross | | – | | 6 | – | 4 | – | 0 |
| No. 20 Pittsburgh | | – | | 6 | – | 4 | – | 0 |
| Boston College | | – | | 5 | – | 4 | – | 0 |
| Army | | – | | 4 | – | 4 | – | 1 |
| Boston University | | – | | 4 | – | 5 | – | 0 |
| Colgate | | – | | 2 | – | 7 | – | 0 |
| Villanova | | – | | 1 | – | 9 | – | 0 |
Rankings from AP poll

The 1959 Colgate Red Raiders football team was an American football team that represented Colgate University as an independent during the 1959 college football season. After the resignation of Fred Rice, the university hired Alva Kelley away from Brown University to be Colgate's new head coach. Kelley led the team to a 2–7 record is his first season. Joseph Wignot was the team captain.

The team played its home games at Colgate Athletic Field in Hamilton, New York.

== Schedule ==
| Date | Opponent | Site | Result | Attendance | Source |
|---|---|---|---|---|---|
| September 26 | Cornell | Colgate Athletic Field; Hamilton, NY (rivalry) | L 15–20 | 10,000 | |
| October 3 | at Penn State | New Beaver Field; State College, PA | L 20–58 | 26,800 | |
| October 10 | at Rutgers | Rutgers Stadium; Piscataway, NJ | L 12–15 | 14,000 | |
| October 17 | at Princeton | Palmer Stadium; Princeton, NJ | L 7–42 | 20,000 | |
| October 24 | at No. 19 Yale | Yale Bowl; New Haven, CT | L 0–21 | 11,000 | |
| October 31 | at Holy Cross | Fitton Field; Worcester, MA | L 12–14 | 6,000 | |
| November 7 | Bucknell | Colgate Athletic Field; Hamilton, NY | W 16–13 | 4,000 | |
| November 14 | at No. 1 Syracuse | Archbold Stadium; Syracuse, NY (rivalry) | L 0–71 | 31,000 | |
| November 26 | at Brown | Brown Stadium; Providence, RI | W 33–14 | 8,000 | |
Rankings from AP Poll released prior to the game

== Leading players ==
Statistical leaders for the 1959 Red Raiders included:

- Rushing: John Maloney, 336 yards and 1 touchdown on 60 attempts
- Passing: Robert Paske, 567 yards, 39 completions and 5 touchdowns on 87 attempts
- Receiving: Jacque MacKinnon, 264 yards and 4 touchdowns on 15 receptions
- Total offense: Robert Paske, 568 yards (567 passing, 1 rushing)
- Scoring: Jacque MacKinnon, 38 points from 6 touchdowns and 1 two-point conversion
- All-purpose yards: Jacque MacKinnon, 960 yards (357 rushing, 264 receiving, 210 punt returning, 76 kickoff returning, 53 interception returning)
