= 1959 Hardin–Simmons Cowboys football team =

American college football season

1959 Hardin–Simmons Cowboys football
- Conference: Border Conference
- Record: 3–7 (2–2 Border)
- Head coach: Sammy Baugh (5th season)
- Home stadium: Public Schools Stadium

1959 Border Conference football standings
	Conf.					Overall
Team	W		L		T	W		L		T
Arizona State $	5	–	0	–	0	10	–	1	–	0
Arizona	2	–	1	–	0	4	–	6	–	0
New Mexico State	2	–	2	–	0	8	–	3	–	0
Hardin–Simmons	2	–	2	–	0	3	–	7	–	0
Texas Western	2	–	3	–	0	3	–	7	–	0
West Texas State	0	–	5	–	0	1	–	9	–	0
$ – Conference champion

The 1959 Hardin–Simmons Cowboys football team was an American football team that represented Hardin–Simmons University in the Border Conference during the 1959 college football season. In its fifth and final season under head coach Sammy Baugh, the team compiled a 3–7 record (2–2 against conference opponents), tied for third place in the conference, and was outscored by a total of 244 to 154. The team played its three home games at Public Schools Stadium in Abilene, Texas.

No Hardin-Simmons players were named to the 1959 All-Border Conference football team.

== Schedule ==
Date	Opponent	Site	Result	Attendance	Source
September 17	North Texas State*	Public Schools Stadium; Abilene, TX	L 24–40	11,000	
September 26	at Wichita*	Veterans Field; Wichita, KS	L 13–27	12,293	
October 3	at Auburn*	Cliff Hare Stadium; Auburn, AL	L 12–35	23,000	
October 10	at Georgia*	Sanford Stadium; Athens, GA	L 6–35	25,000	
October 17	at Tulsa*	Skelly Field; Tulsa, OK	L 8–16	12,317	
October 24	at West Texas State	Buffalo Bowl; Canyon, TX	W 22–0		
October 31	Texas Western^{†}	Public Schools Stadium; Abilene, TX	W 25–14	5,000	
November 7	Trinity (TX)*	Public Schools Stadium; Abilene, TX	W 23–15	4,000	
November 14	at New Mexico A&M	Memorial Stadium; Las Cruces, NM	L 13–42	4,100	
November 21	at Arizona State	Sun Devil Stadium; Tempe, AZ	L 8–14	25,400	
*Non-conference game; ^{†}Homecoming
