= 1959 Yale Bulldogs football team =

American college football season

1959 Yale Bulldogs football
- Conference: Ivy League
- Record: 6–3 (4–3 Ivy)
- Head coach: Jordan Olivar (8th season)
- Captain: Richard Winkler
- Home stadium: Yale Bowl

1959 Ivy League football standings
	Conf.					Overall
Team	W		L		T	W		L		T
Penn $	6	–	1	–	0	7	–	1	–	1
Dartmouth	5	–	1	–	1	5	–	3	–	1
Harvard	4	–	3	–	0	6	–	3	–	0
Yale	4	–	3	–	0	6	–	3	–	0
Cornell	3	–	4	–	0	5	–	4	–	0
Princeton	3	–	4	–	0	4	–	5	–	0
Brown	1	–	5	–	1	2	–	6	–	1
Columbia	1	–	6	–	0	2	–	7	–	0
$ – Conference champion

The 1959 Yale Bulldogs football team represented Yale University in the 1959 college football season. The Bulldogs were led by eighth-year head coach Jordan Olivar, played their home games at the Yale Bowl and finished the season with a 6–3 record.

== Schedule ==
Date	Opponent	Rank	Site	Result	Attendance	Source
September 26	Connecticut*		Yale Bowl; New Haven, CT	W 20–0	30,268	
October 3	Brown		Yale Bowl; New Haven, CT	W 17–0	28,017	
October 10	Columbia		Yale Bowl; New Haven, CT	W 14–0	20,196	
October 17	at Cornell		Schoellkopf Field; Ithaca, NY	W 23–0	20,000	
October 24	Colgate*	No. 19	Yale Bowl; New Haven, CT	W 21–0	11,000	
October 31	Dartmouth	No. 13	Yale Bowl; New Haven, CT	L 8–12	42,741	
November 7	at Penn		Franklin Field; Philadelphia, PA	L 12–28	25,102	
November 14	at Princeton		Palmer Stadium; Princeton, NJ (rivalry)	W 38–20	8,000	
November 21	Harvard		Yale Bowl; New Haven, CT (The Game)	L 6–35	66,053	
*Non-conference game; Rankings from AP Poll released prior to the game
