= 1959 Brown Bears football team =

American college football season

1959 Brown Bears football
- Conference: Ivy League
- Record: 2–6–1 (1–5–1 Ivy)
- Head coach: John McLaughry (1st season)
- Captain: R. Carlin
- Home stadium: Brown Stadium

1959 Ivy League football standings
	Conf.					Overall
Team	W		L		T	W		L		T
Penn $	6	–	1	–	0	7	–	1	–	1
Dartmouth	5	–	1	–	1	5	–	3	–	1
Harvard	4	–	3	–	0	6	–	3	–	0
Yale	4	–	3	–	0	6	–	3	–	0
Cornell	3	–	4	–	0	5	–	4	–	0
Princeton	3	–	4	–	0	4	–	5	–	0
Brown	1	–	5	–	1	2	–	6	–	1
Columbia	1	–	6	–	0	2	–	7	–	0
$ – Conference champion

The 1959 Brown Bears football team was an American football team that represented Brown University during the 1959 college football season. Brown finished second-to-last in the Ivy League.

In their first season under head coach John McLaughry, the Bears compiled a 2–6–1 record and were outscored 139 to 51. R. Carlin was the team captain.

The Bears' 1–5–1 conference record placed seventh in the Ivy League. They were outscored by Ivy opponents 106 to 31.

Brown played its home games at Brown Stadium in Providence, Rhode Island.

== Schedule ==
Date	Opponent	Site	Result	Attendance	Source
September 26	Columbia	Brown Stadium; Providence, RI	L 6–21	7,500	
October 3	at Yale	Yale Bowl; New Haven, CT	L 0–17	28,017	
October 10	at Dartmouth	Memorial Field; Hanover, NH	T 0–0	20,196	
October 17	at Penn	Franklin Field; Philadelphia, PA	L 9–36	13,083	
October 24	Rhode Island*	Brown Stadium; Providence, RI (rivalry)	W 6–0	7,000	
October 31	at Princeton	Palmer Stadium; Princeton, NJ	L 0–7	11,500	
November 7	at Cornell	Schoellkopf Field; Ithaca, NY	L 0–19	8,000	
November 14	Harvard	Brown Stadium; Providence, RI	W 16–6	15,000	
November 21	Colgate*	Brown Stadium; Providence, RI	L 14–33	8,000	
*Non-conference game
