= 1959 West Texas State Buffaloes football team =

American college football season

1959 West Texas State Buffaloes football
- Conference: Border Conference
- Record: 1–9 (0–5 Border)
- Head coach: Clark Jarnagin (2nd season)
- Home stadium: Buffalo Bowl

1959 Border Conference football standings
	Conf.					Overall
Team	W		L		T	W		L		T
Arizona State $	5	–	0	–	0	10	–	1	–	0
Arizona	2	–	1	–	0	4	–	6	–	0
New Mexico State	2	–	2	–	0	8	–	3	–	0
Hardin–Simmons	2	–	2	–	0	3	–	7	–	0
Texas Western	2	–	3	–	0	3	–	7	–	0
West Texas State	0	–	5	–	0	1	–	9	–	0
$ – Conference champion

The 1959 West Texas State Buffaloes football team represented West Texas State College—now known as West Texas A&M University—as a member of the Border Conference during the 1959 college football season. Led by Clark Jarnagin in his second and final season as head coach, the Buffaloes compiled an overall record of 1–9 with a mark of 0–5 in conference play, placing last out of six teams in the Border Conference. West Texas State played home games at the newly-opened Buffalo Bowl in Canyon, Texas.

== Schedule ==
Date	Time	Opponent	Site	Result	Attendance	Source
September 19		at Arizona State	Sun Devil Stadium; Tempe, AZ	L 22–43	25,200	
September 26	8:00 p.m.	Arizona	Buffalo Bowl; Canyon, TX	L 6–7	11,000	
October 3		at North Texas State*	Fouts Field; Denton, TX	L 6–28		
October 10		at Texas Western	Kidd Field; El Paso, TX	L 12–13	7,000	
October 17		No. 1 Mississippi Southern*	Buffalo Bowl; Canyon, TX	L 6–37	5,000	
October 24		Hardin–Simmons	Buffalo Bowl; Canyon, TX	L 0–22	5,000	
October 31	8:00 p.m.	Drake*	Buffalo Bowl; Canyon, TX	W 34–21		
November 7		Virginia Tech*	Buffalo Bowl; Canyon, TX	L 21–26		
November 14		at Trinity (TX)*	Alamo Stadium; San Antonio, TX	L 8–14	801	
November 21		at New Mexico A&M	Memorial Stadium; Las Cruces, NM	L 13–35	7,000	
*Non-conference game; Rankings from UPI Poll released prior to the game; All times are in Central time
