= 1959 Penn State Nittany Lions football team =

American college football season

1959 Penn State Nittany Lions football

Liberty Bowl champion

Liberty Bowl, W 7–0 vs. Alabama
- Conference: Independent

Ranking
- Coaches: No. 10
- AP: No. 12
- Record: 9–2
- Head coach: Rip Engle (10th season)
- Captain: Pat Botula
- Home stadium: New Beaver Field

1959 Eastern major college football independents records
| | Conf. | | | Overall |
| Team | W | L | T | W | | L | | T |
|---|---|---|---|---|---|---|---|---|
| No. 1 Syracuse | | – | | 11 | – | 0 | – | 0 |
| No. 12 Penn State | | – | | 9 | – | 2 | – | 0 |
| Holy Cross | | – | | 6 | – | 4 | – | 0 |
| No. 20 Pittsburgh | | – | | 6 | – | 4 | – | 0 |
| Boston College | | – | | 5 | – | 4 | – | 0 |
| Army | | – | | 4 | – | 4 | – | 1 |
| Boston University | | – | | 4 | – | 5 | – | 0 |
| Colgate | | – | | 2 | – | 7 | – | 0 |
| Villanova | | – | | 1 | – | 9 | – | 0 |
Rankings from AP poll

The 1959 Penn State Nittany Lions football team represented the Pennsylvania State University as an independent during the 1959 college football season. The team was coached by Rip Engle and played its home games in New Beaver Field in University Park, Pennsylvania.

== Schedule ==
| Date | Opponent | Rank | Site | Result | Attendance | Source |
|---|---|---|---|---|---|---|
| September 19 | at Missouri | | Memorial Stadium; Columbia, MO | W 19–8 | 28,000 | |
| September 26 | VMI | No. 18 | New Beaver Field; University Park, PA | W 21–0 | 19,800 | |
| October 3 | Colgate | | New Beaver Field; University Park, PA | W 58–20 | 26,800 | |
| October 10 | at Army | No. 16 | Michie Stadium; West Point, NY | W 17–11 | 27,500 | |
| October 17 | Boston University^{†} | No. 10 | New Beaver Field; University Park, PA | W 21–12 | 25,000 | |
| October 24 | vs. No. 13 Illinois | No. 8 | Cleveland Municipal Stadium; Cleveland, OH | W 20–9 | 15,045 | |
| October 31 | at West Virginia | No. 7 | Mountaineer Field; Morgantown, WV (rivalry) | W 28–10 | 17,000 | |
| November 7 | No. 4 Syracuse | No. 7 | New Beaver Field; University Park, PA (rivalry) | L 18–20 | 32,800–34,000 | |
| November 14 | Holy Cross | No. 10 | New Beaver Field; University Park, PA | W 46–0 | 20,000 | |
| November 21 | at Pittsburgh | No. 7 | Pitt Stadium; Pittsburgh, PA (rivalry) | L 7–22 | 46,104–46,109 | |
| December 19 | vs. No. 11 Alabama | No. 14 | Philadelphia Municipal Stadium; Philadelphia, PA (Liberty Bowl, rivalry) | W 7–0 | 36,211 | |
^{†}Homecoming; Rankings from AP Poll released prior to the game
