= 1959 Columbia Lions football team =

American college football season

1959 Columbia Lions football
- Conference: Ivy League
- Record: 2–7 (1–6 Ivy)
- Head coach: Aldo Donelli (3rd season)
- Captain: Harvey Brookins
- Home stadium: Baker Field

1959 Ivy League football standings
	Conf.					Overall
Team	W		L		T	W		L		T
Penn $	6	–	1	–	0	7	–	1	–	1
Dartmouth	5	–	1	–	1	5	–	3	–	1
Harvard	4	–	3	–	0	6	–	3	–	0
Yale	4	–	3	–	0	6	–	3	–	0
Cornell	3	–	4	–	0	5	–	4	–	0
Princeton	3	–	4	–	0	4	–	5	–	0
Brown	1	–	5	–	1	2	–	6	–	1
Columbia	1	–	6	–	0	2	–	7	–	0
$ – Conference champion

The 1959 Columbia Lions football team was an American football team that represented Columbia University during the 1959 college football season. Columbia finished last in the Ivy League.

In their third season under head coach Aldo "Buff" Donelli, the Lions compiled a 2–7 record and were outscored 210 to 82. Harvey Brookins was the team captain.

The Lions' 1–6 conference record placed eighth in the Ivy League. Columbia was outscored 139 to 56 by Ivy opponents.

Columbia played its home games at Baker Field in Upper Manhattan, in New York City.

== Schedule ==
Date	Opponent	Site	Result	Attendance	Source
September 26	at Brown	Brown Stadium; Providence, RI	W 21–6	7,500	
October 3	Princeton	Baker Field; New York, NY	L 0–22	18,000	
October 10	at Yale	Yale Bowl; New Haven, CT	L 0–14	20,196	
October 17	at Harvard	Harvard Stadium; Boston, MA	L 22–38	12,000	
October 24	Holy Cross*	Baker Field; New York, NY	L 0–34	6,000	
October 31	at Cornell	Schoellkopf Field; Ithaca, NY (rivalry)	L 7–34	8,500	
November 7	Dartmouth^{†}	Baker Field; New York, NY	L 0–22	5,000	
November 14	Penn	Baker Field; New York, NY	L 6–24	46,000	
November 21	Rutgers*	Baker Field; New York, NY	W 26–16	12,000	
*Non-conference game; ^{†}Homecoming
