= 1959 Princeton Tigers football team =

American college football season

1959 Princeton Tigers football
- Conference: Ivy League
- Record: 4–5 (3–4 Ivy)
- Head coach: Dick Colman (3rd season)
- Captain: Frank C. Szvetecz
- Home stadium: Palmer Stadium

1959 Ivy League football standings
	Conf.					Overall
Team	W		L		T	W		L		T
Penn $	6	–	1	–	0	7	–	1	–	1
Dartmouth	5	–	1	–	1	5	–	3	–	1
Harvard	4	–	3	–	0	6	–	3	–	0
Yale	4	–	3	–	0	6	–	3	–	0
Cornell	3	–	4	–	0	5	–	4	–	0
Princeton	3	–	4	–	0	4	–	5	–	0
Brown	1	–	5	–	1	2	–	6	–	1
Columbia	1	–	6	–	0	2	–	7	–	0
$ – Conference champion

The 1959 Princeton Tigers football team was an American football team that represented Princeton University during the 1959 college football season. Princeton tied for fifth in the Ivy League.

In their third year under head coach Dick Colman, the Tigers compiled a 4–5 record but outscored opponents 124 to 97. Frank C. Szvetecz was the team captain.

Princeton's 3–4 conference record tied for fifth-best in the Ivy League. The Tigers were outscored 82 to 76 by Ivy opponents.

Princeton played its home games at Palmer Stadium on the university campus in Princeton, New Jersey.

== Schedule ==
Date	Opponent	Site	Result	Attendance	Source
September 26	Rutgers*	Palmer Stadium; Princeton, NJ (rivalry)	L 6–8	36,000	
October 3	at Columbia	Baker Field; New York, NY	W 22–0	18,000	
October 10	Penn	Palmer Stadium; Princeton, NJ (rivalry)	L 0–18	32,000	
October 17	Colgate*	Palmer Stadium; Princeton, NJ	W 42–7	20,000	
October 24	Cornell	Palmer Stadium; Princeton, NJ	W 20–0	22,000	
October 31	Brown	Palmer Stadium; Princeton, NJ	W 7–0	11,500	
November 7	at Harvard	Harvard Stadium; Boston, MA (rivalry)	L 0–14	20,000	
November 14	Yale	Palmer Stadium; Princeton, NJ (rivalry)	L 20–38	8,000	
November 21	Dartmouth	Palmer Stadium; Princeton, NJ	L 7–12	30,000	
*Non-conference game
