= Dave DiFilippo =

American football player and coach (1916–1983)

No. 26
- Position: Guard

Personal information
- Born: October 9, 1916; Philadelphia, Pennsylvania, U.S.
- Died: August 29, 1983 (aged 66); Somers Point, New Jersey, U.S.
- Listed height: 5 ft 10 in (1.78 m)
- Listed weight: 210 lb (95 kg)

Career information
- High school: West Catholic Preparatory (Philadelphia)
- College: Villanova

Career history
- Philadelphia Eagles (1941); Army Eastern All-Stars (1942); Los Angeles Dons (1946)*
- * Offseason or practice squad member only

David Edward DiFilippo (October 9, 1916 – August 29, 1983) was an American football guard and coach. A native of Philadelphia, he played college football for Villanova and professional football for the Philadelphia Eagles. He held coaching positions in college and professional football and led the Pottstown Firebirds to two Atlantic Coast Football League championships in three years as the head coach.

== Early life ==
DiFilippo was born in Philadelphia in 1916 and attended West Catholic High School. He played college football for Villanova from 1937 to 1939. He was part of the undefeated 1937 and 1938 Villanova teams that were ranked No. 6 and No. 18, respectively in the final AP polls.

== Professional football ==
He then played professional football in the National Football League (NFL) for the Philadelphia Eagles (NFL), appearing in five games, two as a starter, during the 1941 season.

DiFilippo enlisted in the Army and in the fall of 1942 played on the Army Eastern All-Stars, a team of football stars serving in the military who played against NFL teams. He attained the rank of captain and also played on the Kessler Field and First Air Force football teams.

Following his discharge from the military, he played for the Los Angeles Dons of the All-America Football Conference, but did not appear in any regular season games.

== Coaching career ==
From 1947 to 1951, he coached the Tacony semipro football team. He then coached football at St. Thomas More High School from 1951 to 1953. He returned to Villanova in 1954 as a line coach, a position he held until 1959. In the week leading up to a game with West Chester, he spied on the opposition's practice sessions wearing a blond wig, sunglasses, and a raincoat, then returned to Villanova to develop a winning strategy.

He worked briefly as a scout for the Philadelphia Eagles and then as an assistant coach at Temple. He then worked for several minor league football teams, including coaching the Philadelphia Bulldogs of the Continental Football League and general manager and head coach of the Pottstown Firebirds of the Atlantic Coast Football League (ACFL). He won two ACFL championships in three years with Pottstown and was selected in 1970 as ACFL coach of the year.

== Later life ==
In his later years, he worked in the insurance business, operated a beer distributorship and a restaurant known as Coach's Corner, and lived in Ocean City, New Jersey. He was inducted into the Pennsylvania Sports Hall of Fame and the Villanova Hall of Fame. He died in 1983, at Shore Memorial Hospital in Somers Point, New Jersey.
