= 1959 Navy Midshipmen football team =

American college football season

1959 Navy Midshipmen football
- Conference: Independent
- Record: 5–4–1
- Head coach: Wayne Hardin (1st season)
- Captain: Dick Dagampat
- Home stadium: Navy–Marine Corps Memorial Stadium

1959 Southern major college football independents records
	Conf.			Overall
Team	W	L	T	W		L		T
Miami (FL)		–		6	–	4	–	0
Oklahoma State		–		6	–	4	–	0
Navy		–		5	–	4	–	1
Florida State		–		4	–	6	–	0
Texas Tech		–		4	–	6	–	0

The 1959 Navy Midshipmen football team represented the United States Naval Academy (USNA) as an independent during the 1959 college football season. The team was led by first-year head coach Wayne Hardin.

== Schedule ==
Date	Time	Opponent	Rank	Site	TV	Result	Attendance	Source
September 19		at Boston College		Alumni Stadium; Chestnut Hill, MA		W 24–8	23,000	
September 26		William & Mary^{†}	No. 13	Navy–Marine Corps Memorial Stadium; Annapolis, MD		W 29–2	25,003	
October 3		at SMU	No. 15	Cotton Bowl Stadium; Dallas, TX (rivalry)		L 7–20	46,000	
October 10		vs. No. 12 Syracuse		Foreman Field; Norfolk, VA (Oyster Bowl)		L 6–32	31,700	
October 16		at Miami (FL)		Miami Orange Bowl; Miami, FL		L 8–23	51,694	
October 24		at Penn		Franklin Field; Philadelphia, PA		T 22–22	25,696	
October 31		at Notre Dame		Notre Dame Stadium; Notre Dame, IN (rivalry)		L 22–25	58,652	
November 7		vs. Maryland		Memorial Stadium; Baltimore, MD (rivalry)		W 22–14	32,845	
November 14		George Washington		Navy–Marine Corps Memorial Stadium; Annapolis, MD		W 16–8	14,000	
November 28	1:15 p.m.	vs. Army		Philadelphia Municipal Stadium; Philadelphia, PA (Army–Navy Game)	NBC	W 43–12	100,000–102,000	
^{†}Homecoming; Rankings from AP Poll released prior to the game; All times are in Eastern time
