= Frank Reagan =

American football player, coach, and college athletics administrator

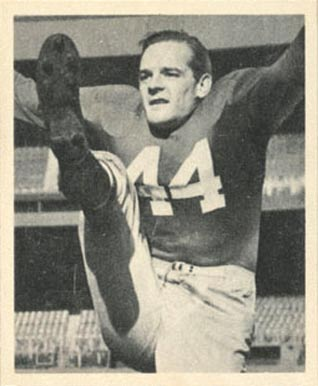
- Reagan on a 1948 Bowman football card

No. 8, 44, 40
- Positions: Safety, punter

Personal information
- Born: July 28, 1919; Philadelphia, Pennsylvania, U.S.
- Died: November 20, 1972 (aged 53); Philadelphia, Pennsylvania, U.S.
- Listed height: 5 ft 11 in (1.80 m)
- Listed weight: 182 lb (83 kg)

Career information
- High school: Northeast Catholic (Philadelphia)
- College: Penn
- NFL draft: 1941: 3rd round, 22nd overall pick

Career history

Playing
- New York Giants (1941, 1946–1948); Philadelphia Eagles (1949–1951)

Coaching
- Philadelphia Eagles (1952–1953) (Backfield); Villanova (1954–1959) (Head coach)

Operations
- Villanova (1957–1961) (Athletic director)

Awards and highlights
- NFL champion (1949); NFL interceptions leader (1947); First-team All-American (1940); First-team All-Eastern (1940); Second-team All-Eastern (1939)

Career NFL statistics
- Interceptions: 35
- Punts: 227
- Punting yards: 9,288
- Punting average: 40.9
- Stats at Pro Football Reference

Francis Xavier Reagan (July 28, 1919 – November 20, 1972) was an American professional football player, coach, and college athletics administrator. He played professionally for the New York Giants and the Philadelphia Eagles during a seven-season National Football League (NFL) career that spanned from 1941 to 1951. Reagan served as the head football coach at Villanova University from 1954 to 1959, compiling a record of 16–36. He was also Villanova's athletic director from 1957 to 1961.

== Early life and playing career ==
Born in Philadelphia, Reagan was a star quarterback and defensive back at Northeast Catholic High School and led the team to championships in 1935 and 1936. He was voted 1st Team All-Scholastic by the Philadelphia Bulletin in his senior year.

Reagan then played college football at the University of Pennsylvania. Standing 5'11" and 182 lbs., Reagan was a varsity player during George Munger's first three seasons as head coach of the Penn Quakers, from 1938 to 1940. Reagan's 135 points scored is still ninth all-time in UPenn history and his 103 points scored as a senior is the second most in one season in over 120 years of Penn football. Reagan had one of the great individual performances of all time against Princeton on October 19, 1940, rushing for 200 yards, scoring five touchdowns and 31 points in a 46–28 victory at Franklin Field. In a game at Michigan in 1938, Reagan was responsible for 356 total yards, rushing for 85, passing for 188, returning kickoffs for 82 and punts for 21. Reagan was named a 1st Team All-American Back for the 1940 season. A captain of both the football and baseball teams, he was awarded the 1941 "Class of 1915 Award" as that member of the senior class who, "most closely approaches the ideal University of Pennsylvania student-athlete". Sportswriter Grantland Rice called him "one of the two best running backs in college football", the other being Heisman Trophy winner Tom Harmon of the University of Michigan.

Reagan was drafted in the third round of the 1941 NFL draft by the New York Giants. After an outstanding rookie season his pro career was interrupted by his military service during World War II. Upon returning to the NFL he led the league in interceptions in 1947. He was traded to the Eagles after the 1948 season and was a big factor in helping the Eagles repeat as NFL Champions in 1949. He played starting safety and recorded seven interceptions. He also punted for a 45-yard average and returned punts for 12.7 yards per return and one touchdown. During his pro career Reagan averaged 40.9 yards on 224 career punts. He finished his NFL career in 1951 with 35 interceptions, which led all of football before former teammate Emlen Tunnell passed him the following year. He also scored six touchdowns on offense and threw a touchdown pass.

== Coaching and administrative career, later life, honors ==
Following his retirement as a player and a brief tenure as an assistant coach of the Eagles, Reagan went on to become head coach at Villanova University in 1954. He stayed in that position until 1959. He remained the school's athletic director until 1961 when he went into partnership in an insurance brokerage firm in Norristown, Pennsylvania.

Reagan died of complications of lung cancer at age 53 in 1972. He is enshrined in both the Northeast Catholic HS Hall of Fame and the University of Pennsylvania Hall of Fame. In 2000, Philadelphia Daily News sports writer Ted Silary named Reagan as the best Philadelphia area born punter of the 20th century.

== Head coaching record ==
Year	Team	Overall	Conference	Standing	Bowl/playoffs
Villanova Wildcats (Independent) (1954–1959)
1954	Villanova	1–9			
1955	Villanova	1–9			
1956	Villanova	5–4			
1957	Villanova	3–6			
1958	Villanova	6–4			
1959	Villanova	0–4			
Villanova:		16–36			
Total:		16–36			
