= List of Hofstra Pride football seasons =

The following is a list of Hofstra Pride football seasons.

== Seasons ==
Year	Team	Overall	Conference	Standing	Bowl/playoffs
Howdy Myers (Independent) (1950–1959)
1950	Hofstra	2–6			
1951	Hofstra	6–2–1			
1952	Hofstra	8–1			
1953	Hofstra	6–3			
1954	Hofstra	7–2			
1955	Hofstra	3–6			
1956	Hofstra	7–3			
1957	Hofstra	9–1			
1958	Hofstra	6–4			
1959	Hofstra	9–0			
Howdy Myers (Middle Atlantic Conference) (1960–1969)
1960	Hofstra	7–1–1	2–0	N/A (Northern College)	
1961	Hofstra	7–2	2–0	N/A (Northern College)	
1962	Hofstra	8–2	1–0	N/A (Northern College)	L Cement Bowl
1963	Hofstra	3–6	0–0	N/A (Northern College)	
1964	Hofstra	6–3–1	0–3–1	T–6th (University)	
1965	Hofstra	8–2	4–1	2nd (University)	
1966	Hofstra	2–8	1–3	6th (University)	
1967	Hofstra	8–2	3–1	2nd (University)	
1968	Hofstra	5–5	1–3	6th (University)	
1969	Hofstra	0–10	0–5	7th (University)	
Howdy Myers (NCAA College Division independent) (1970–1971)
1970	Hofstra	5–5			
1971	Hofstra	5–6			
Howdy Myers (Metropolitan Intercollegiate Conference) (1972–1974)
1972	Hofstra	5–6			
1973	Hofstra	8–3			
1974	Hofstra	1–9–1			
Bill Leete (Metropolitan Intercollegiate Conference) (1975–1977)
1975	Hofstra	3–6			
1976	Hofstra	4–4			
1977	Hofstra	6–3			
Bill Leete (NCAA Division III independent) (1978–1990)
1978	Hofstra	4–5			
1979	Hofstra	5–3–1			
1980	Hofstra	8–2			
Mickey Kwiatkowski (NCAA Division III independent) (1981–1989)
1981	Hofstra	4–6			
1982	Hofstra	6–4			
1983	Hofstra	10–1			L NCAA Division III Quarterfinal
1984	Hofstra	9–1			
1985	Hofstra	4–6			
1986	Hofstra	9–2			L NCAA Division III First Round
1987	Hofstra	9–2			L NCAA Division III First Round
1988	Hofstra	9–2			L NCAA Division III First Round
1989	Hofstra	8–3			L NCAA Division III First Round
Joe Gardi (NCAA Division III independent) (1990–1992)
1990	Hofstra	12–1			L NCAA Division III Semifinal
1991	Hofstra	8–2			
1992	Hofstra	4–6			
Joe Gardi (NCAA Division I-AA independent) (1993–2000)
1993	Hofstra	6–3–1			
1994	Hofstra	8–1–1			
1995	Hofstra	10–2			L NCAA Division I-AA First Round
1996	Hofstra	5–6			
1997	Hofstra	9–3			L NCAA Division I-AA First Round
1998	Hofstra	8–3			
1999	Hofstra	11–2			L NCAA Division I-AA Quarterfinal
2000	Hofstra	9–4			L NCAA Division I-AA Quarterfinal
Joe Gardi (Atlantic-10 Conference) (2001–2005)
2001	Hofstra	9–3	7–2	T–1st	L NCAA Division I-AA First Round
2002	Hofstra	6–6	4–5	T–6th	
2003	Hofstra	2–10	2–6	10th	
2004	Hofstra	5–6	3–5	9th	
2005	Hofstra	7–4	6–3	3rd (North)	
Dave Cohen (Atlantic 10 Conference) (2006)
2006	Hofstra	2–9	1–7	6th (North)	
Dave Cohen (Colonial Athletic Association) (2007–2009)
2007	Hofstra	7–4	4–4	T–2nd (North)	
2008	Hofstra	4–8	2–6	4th (North)	
2009	Hofstra	5–6	3–5	T–3rd (North)	
Total:					
National championship Conference title Conference division title or championship game berth
^{†}Indicates Bowl Coalition, Bowl Alliance, BCS, or CFP / New Years' Six bowl.; ^{#}Rankings from final Coaches Poll.
