= 1959 Eastern Michigan Hurons football team =

American college football season

1959 Eastern Michigan Hurons football
- Conference: Interstate Intercollegiate Athletic Conference
- Record: 1–7 (1–5 IIAC)
- Head coach: Fred Trosko (8th season)
- MVP: Albert E. Day
- Captain: Dave L. Longridge
- Home stadium: Briggs Field

1959 Interstate Intercollegiate Athletic Conference football standings
	Conf.					Overall
Team	W		L		T	W		L		T
No. 2 Western Illinois $	6	–	0	–	0	9	–	0	–	0
No. 17 Northern Illinois State	4	–	2	–	0	7	–	2	–	0
Central Michigan	4	–	2	–	0	7	–	3	–	0
Southern Illinois	4	–	2	–	0	5	–	4	–	0
Eastern Illinois	1	–	4	–	1	3	–	5	–	1
Eastern Michigan	1	–	5	–	0	1	–	7	–	0
Illinois State Normal	0	–	5	–	1	3	–	5	–	1
$ – Conference champion; Rankings from NAIA poll

The 1959 Eastern Michigan Hurons football team represented Eastern Michigan University in the Interstate Intercollegiate Athletic Conference (IIAC) during the 1959 college football season. In their eighth season under head coach Fred Trosko, the Hurons compiled a 1–7 record (1–5 against IIAC opponents) and were outscored by their opponents, 217 to 50. In the second game of the season, the Hurons defeated Illinois State by a 14–7 score, but then lost the six remaining games. Dave L. Longridge was the team captain and also led the team with 513 passing yards and 517 yards of total offense.

Albert Day led the team with 226 rushing yards and was a first-team selection for the All-IIAC team; he was also selected for the team's most valuable player award. The team totaled only 645 net yards of offense.

The Hurons had great success in the 1950s, winning IIAC conference championships in 1954, 1955 and 1957.

However, by 1959, Eastern Michigan had ceased granting athletic scholarships, even though IIAC rules permitted member schools to do so. The school also banned recruiting and drastically reduced the football program's budget to $15,300. University vice president William Lawrence explained: "We feel athletics here are for students with students the participants.

We don't think it's our job to go out and hire a troop of athletes to entertain our students." Using non-scholarship athletes against IIAC schools with scholarship athletes, Trosko's Eastern Michigan teams were unable to compete and suffered a 29-game winless streak (0–27–2) between October 7, 1959, and October 27, 1962.

== Schedule ==
Date	Opponent	Site	Result	Attendance	Source
September 30	Youngstown State*	Briggs Field; Ypsilanti, MI	L 3–21	4,137	
October 7	Illinois State	Briggs Field; Ypsilanti, MI	W 13–7	3,500	
October 14	at Northern Michigan*	Marquette, MI	L 6–39		
October 17	Central Michigan^{†}	Briggs Field; Ypsilanti, MI (rivalry)	L 8–21	5,000	
October 24	at Eastern Illinois	Lincoln Field; Charleston, IL	L 6–32		
October 31	Southern Illinois	Briggs Field; Ypsilanti, MI	L 14–41	600	
November 7	at Northern Illinois*	Glidden Field; DeKalb, IL	L 0–34		
November 14	at No. 9 Western Illinois	Hanson Field; Macomb, IL	L 0–22		
*Non-conference game; ^{†}Homecoming; Rankings from UPI Poll released prior to the game
