= 1959 Eastern Illinois Panthers football team =

American college football season

1959 Eastern Illinois Panthers football
- Conference: Interstate Intercollegiate Athletic Conference
- Record: 3–5–1 (1–4–1 IIAC)
- Head coach: Ralph Kohl (3rd season)
- Home stadium: Lincoln Field

1959 Interstate Intercollegiate Athletic Conference football standings
| | Conf. | | | | | Overall |
| Team | W | | L | | T | W | | L | | T |
|---|---|---|---|---|---|---|---|---|---|---|
| No. 2 Western Illinois $ | 6 | – | 0 | – | 0 | 9 | – | 0 | – | 0 |
| No. 17 Northern Illinois State | 4 | – | 2 | – | 0 | 7 | – | 2 | – | 0 |
| Central Michigan | 4 | – | 2 | – | 0 | 7 | – | 3 | – | 0 |
| Southern Illinois | 4 | – | 2 | – | 0 | 5 | – | 4 | – | 0 |
| Eastern Illinois | 1 | – | 4 | – | 1 | 3 | – | 5 | – | 1 |
| Eastern Michigan | 1 | – | 5 | – | 0 | 1 | – | 7 | – | 0 |
| Illinois State Normal | 0 | – | 5 | – | 1 | 3 | – | 5 | – | 1 |
$ – Conference champion; Rankings from NAIA poll

The 1959 Eastern Illinois Panthers football team represented Eastern Illinois University as a member of the Interstate Intercollegiate Athletic Conference (IIAC) during the 1959 college football season. The team was led by third-year head coach Ralph Kohl and played their home games at Lincoln Field in Charleston, Illinois. The Panthers finished the season with a 3–5–1 record overall and a 1–4–1 record in conference play.

== Schedule ==
| Date | Opponent | Site | Result | Attendance | Source |
|---|---|---|---|---|---|
| September 19 | at Indiana State* | Memorial Stadium; Terre Haute, IN | W 7–6 | 3,000 | |
| September 26 | Austin Peay* | Lincoln Field; Charleston, IL | L 8–12 | | |
| October 3 | Ball State* | Lincoln Field; Charleston, IL | W 14–8 | 1,200 | |
| October 10 | Northern Illinois | Lincoln Field; Charleston, IL | L 6–38 | | |
| October 17 | at Southern Illinois | McAndrew Stadium; Carbondale, IL | L 0–7 | 11,500–13,000 | |
| October 24 | Eastern Michigan | Lincoln Field; Charleston, IL | W 32–6 | | |
| October 31 | No. 11 Western Illinois | Lincoln Field; Charleston, IL | L 8–28 | | |
| November 7 | at Central Michigan | Alumni Field; Mount Pleasant, MI | L 0–26 | 3,400–3,500 | |
| November 14 | at Illinois State Normal | McCormick Field; Normal, IL (rivalry) | T 6–6 | | |
*Non-conference game; Rankings from UPI Poll released prior to the game
