= 1959 Western Michigan Broncos football team =

American college football season

1959 Western Michigan Broncos football
- Conference: Mid-American Conference
- Record: 4–5 (3–3 MAC)
- Head coach: Merle Schlosser (3rd season)
- MVP: Clarence Cheatham
- Captain: Dick Olmsted
- Home stadium: Waldo Stadium

1959 Mid-American Conference football standings
	Conf.					Overall
Team	W		L		T	W		L		T
No. 1 Bowling Green $	6	–	0	–	0	9	–	0	–	0
No. 9 Ohio	4	–	2	–	0	7	–	2	–	0
No. 19 Miami (OH)	3	–	2	–	0	5	–	4	–	0
Kent State	3	–	3	–	0	5	–	3	–	0
Western Michigan	3	–	3	–	0	4	–	5	–	0
Marshall	1	–	4	–	0	1	–	8	–	0
Toledo	0	–	6	–	0	2	–	6	–	1
$ – Conference champion; Rankings from UPI small college poll

The 1959 Western Michigan Broncos football team represented Western Michigan University in the Mid-American Conference (MAC) during the 1959 college football season. In their third season under head coach Merle Schlosser, the Broncos compiled a 4–5 record (3–3 against MAC opponents), finished in fifth place in the MAC, and outscored their opponents, 185 to 116. The team played its home games at Waldo Stadium in Kalamazoo, Michigan.

Guard Dick Olmsted was the team captain. Offensive guard Clarence Cheatham received the team's most outstanding player award.

== Schedule ==
Date	Opponent	Site	Result	Attendance	Source
September 19	at Central Michigan*	Alumni Field; Mount Pleasant, MI (rivalry)	L 15–21	5,800–7,000	
September 26	No. 6 Miami (OH)	Waldo Stadium; Kalamazoo, MI	L 0–21	12,000	
October 3	Marshall	Waldo Stadium; Kalamazoo, MI	W 51–0	10,000	
October 10	at No. 17 Bowling Green	Bowling Green, OH	L 0–34	9,500	
October 17	Washington University*	Waldo Stadium; Kalamazoo, MI	W 78–0	11,500	
October 24	at Toledo	Glass Bowl; Toledo, OH	W 24–14	3,200	
October 31	at No. 10 Ohio	Peden Stadium; Athens, OH	L 9–12	10,200–12,000	
November 7	Kent State	Waldo Stadium; Kalamazoo, MI	W 7–0	6,500	
November 14	Detroit*	Waldo Stadium; Kalamazoo, MI	L 0–14	6,500	
*Non-conference game; Rankings from UPI Poll released prior to the game
