= 1959 Marshall Thundering Herd football team =

American college football season

1959 Marshall Thundering Herd football
- Conference: Mid-American Conference
- Record: 1–8 (1–4 MAC)
- Head coach: Charlie Snyder (1st season)
- Captains: Jim Maddox; Jim O'Conner
- Home stadium: Fairfield Stadium

1959 Mid-American Conference football standings
	Conf.					Overall
Team	W		L		T	W		L		T
No. 1 Bowling Green $	6	–	0	–	0	9	–	0	–	0
No. 9 Ohio	4	–	2	–	0	7	–	2	–	0
No. 19 Miami (OH)	3	–	2	–	0	5	–	4	–	0
Kent State	3	–	3	–	0	5	–	3	–	0
Western Michigan	3	–	3	–	0	4	–	5	–	0
Marshall	1	–	4	–	0	1	–	8	–	0
Toledo	0	–	6	–	0	2	–	6	–	1
$ – Conference champion; Rankings from UPI small college poll

The 1959 Marshall Thundering Herd football team was an American football team that represented Marshall University in the Mid-American Conference (MAC) during the 1959 college football season. In its first season under head coach Charlie Snyder, the team compiled a 1–8 record (1–4 against conference opponents), finished in sixth place out of seven teams in the MAC, and was outscored by a total of 343 to 72. Jim Maddox and Jim O'Conner were the team captains. The team played its home games at Fairfield Stadium in Huntington, West Virginia.

== Schedule ==
Date	Opponent	Site	Result	Attendance	Source
September 19	VMI*	Fairfield Stadium; Huntington, WV	L 0–46	7,500	
September 26	Bowling Green	Fairfield Stadium; Huntington, WV	L 7–51	4,000	
October 3	Western Michigan	Fairfield Stadium; Huntington, WV	L 0–51	10,000	
October 10	at Toledo	Glass Bowl; Toledo, OH	W 20–13	1,000	
October 17	at No. 19 Kent State	Memorial Stadium; Kent, OH	L 7–46		
October 24	at No. 2. Delaware*	Delaware Stadium; Newark, DE	L 6–30	4,896–5,809	
October 31	at Louisville*	Cardinal Stadium; Louisville, KY	L 6–48	2,592	
November 7	No. 11 Ohio^{†}	Fairfield Stadium; Huntington, WV (rivalry)	L 14–21	6,000	
November 21	at No. T–11 Buffalo*	Rotary Field; Buffalo, NY	L 12–37	7,500	
*Non-conference game; ^{†}Homecoming; Rankings from UPI Poll released prior to the game
