= 1959 Temple Owls football team =

American college football season

1959 Temple Owls football
- Conference: Middle Atlantic Conference
- University Division
- Record: 0–9 (0–5 MAC)
- Head coach: Peter P. Stevens (4th season)
- Home stadium: Temple Stadium

1959 Middle Atlantic Conference football standings
	Conf.					Overall
Team	W		L		T	W		L		T
University Division
Delaware x	5	–	0	–	0	8	–	1	–	0
Gettysburg	3	–	2	–	0	5	–	4	–	0
Lafayette	4	–	3	–	0	5	–	4	–	0
Bucknell	3	–	3	–	0	4	–	5	–	0
Rutgers	2	–	2	–	0	6	–	3	–	0
Lehigh	2	–	3	–	0	4	–	5	–	0
Temple	0	–	5	–	0	0	–	9	–	0
Muhlenberg *	1	–	2	–	0	3	–	6	–	0
Northern College Division
Albright x	6	–	1	–	0	7	–	3	–	0
Juniata	5	–	1	–	0	7	–	1	–	0
Wagner	5	–	1	–	0	6	–	2	–	0
Lebanon Valley	3	–	2	–	0	5	–	3	–	0
Susquehanna	3	–	2	–	0	4	–	3	–	0
Moravian	2	–	4	–	0	3	–	5	–	0
Wilkes	2	–	5	–	0	2	–	5	–	0
Lycoming	1	–	4	–	0	3	–	5	–	0
Scranton *	3	–	1	–	0	5	–	4	–	0
Southern College Division
Johns Hopkins x	6	–	0	–	0	7	–	1	–	0
Pennsylvania Military	6	–	2	–	0	6	–	2	–	0
Western Maryland	3	–	2	–	1	5	–	2	–	2
Ursinus	2	–	5	–	0	2	–	6	–	0
Dickinson	1	–	5	–	0	1	–	7	–	0
Haverford	0	–	5	–	0	1	–	5	–	0
Drexel	0	–	5	–	0	1	–	6	–	0
Franklin & Marshall *	1	–	2	–	1	4	–	3	–	1
Swarthmore *	1	–	3	–	0	2	–	5	–	0
West Chester *	0	–	0	–	0	7	–	1	–	0
x – Division champion/co-champions; * – Ineligible for championship due to insufficient conference games

The 1959 Temple Owls football team was an American football team that represented Temple University as a member of the Middle Atlantic Conference (MAC) during the 1959 college football season. In its fourth and final season under head coach Peter P. Stevens, the team compiled a 0–9 record. The season was part of a 21-game losing streak that began on November 2, 1957, and ended on September 24, 1960. The team played its home games at Temple Stadium in Philadelphia.

Stevens resigned as Temple's head football coach on December 31, 1959. He had been associated with Temple football for 17 years, first as a player, then as an assistant coach for nine years, and finally as head coach from 1956 to 1959.

== Schedule ==
Date	Opponent	Site	Result	Attendance	Source
September 26	Buffalo*	Temple Stadium; Philadelphia, PA	L 6–54	4,000	
October 3	Scranton*	Temple Stadium; Philadelphia, PA	L 0–6	3,000	
October 10	Muhlenberg	Temple Stadium; Philadelphia, PA	L 18–21	4,000	
October 17	Lafayette^{†}	Temple Stadium; Philadelphia, PA	L 0–35	6,000	
October 24	Hofstra*	Temple Stadium; Philadelphia, PA	L 6–34	2,500	
October 31	at Drexel*	Drexel Field; Philadelphia, PA	L 8–12	2,500–5,000	
November 7	at No. 1 Delaware	Delaware Stadium; Newark, DE	L 7–14	2,000–4,500	
November 14	at Bucknell	Memorial Stadium; Lewisburg, PA	L 6–26	4,500	
November 21	at Gettysburg	Memorial Field; Gettysburg, PA	L 6–22	3,500	
*Non-conference game; ^{†}Homecoming; Rankings from UPI Poll released prior to the game
