= 1959 Rhode Island Rams football team =

American college football season

1959 Rhode Island Rams football
- Conference: Yankee Conference
- Record: 3–5–1 (1–2–1 Yankee)
- Head coach: Herb Maack (4th season)
- Home stadium: Meade Stadium

1959 Yankee Conference football standings
	Conf.					Overall
Team	W		L		T	W		L		T
Connecticut $	4	–	0	–	0	6	–	3	–	0
UMass	2	–	2	–	0	3	–	5	–	1
Maine	1	–	2	–	2	3	–	3	–	2
New Hampshire	1	–	2	–	1	3	–	3	–	2
Rhode Island	1	–	2	–	1	3	–	5	–	1
Vermont	0	–	1	–	0	4	–	3	–	0
$ – Conference champion

The 1959 Rhode Island Rams football team was an American football team that represented the University of Rhode Island as a member of the Yankee Conference during the 1959 college football season. In its fourth season under head coach Herb Maack, the team compiled a 3–5–1 record (1–2–1 against conference opponents), tied for fourth place out of six teams in the Yankee Conference, and was outscored by a total of 159 to 64. The team played its home games at Meade Stadium in Kingston, Rhode Island.

== Schedule ==
Date	Opponent	Site	Result	Attendance	Source
September 19	at Northeastern*	Boston, MA	W 8–6	4,000	
September 26	Maine	Meade Stadium; Kingston, RI	T 0–0	3,227–3,500	
October 3	New Hampshire	Meade Stadium; Kingston, RI	L 0–45	3,500–4,200	
October 10	at Brandeis*	Waltham, MA	W 20–0	2,000	
October 17	at UMass	Alumni Field; Amherst, MA	W 30–6	6,478–6,500	
October 24	at Brown*	Brown Stadium; Providence, RI (rivalry)	L 0–6	7,000	
October 31	Springfield*	Meade Stadium; Kingston, RI	L 0–21	4,000	
November 7	at No. 9 Buffalo*	Rotary Field; Buffalo, NY	L 6–41	8,500–9,000	
November 14	at Connecticut	Memorial Stadium; Storrs, CT (rivalry)	L 0–34	10,300–10,352	
*Non-conference game; Rankings from UPI Poll released prior to the game
