= 1959 Southern Illinois Salukis football team =

American college football season

1959 Southern Illinois Salukis football
- Conference: Interstate Intercollegiate Athletic Conference
- Record: 5–4 (4–2 IIAC)
- Head coach: Carmen Piccone (1st season)
- Home stadium: McAndrew Stadium

1959 Interstate Intercollegiate Athletic Conference football standings
	Conf.					Overall
Team	W		L		T	W		L		T
No. 2 Western Illinois $	6	–	0	–	0	9	–	0	–	0
No. 17 Northern Illinois State	4	–	2	–	0	7	–	2	–	0
Central Michigan	4	–	2	–	0	7	–	3	–	0
Southern Illinois	4	–	2	–	0	5	–	4	–	0
Eastern Illinois	1	–	4	–	1	3	–	5	–	1
Eastern Michigan	1	–	5	–	0	1	–	7	–	0
Illinois State Normal	0	–	5	–	1	3	–	5	–	1
$ – Conference champion; Rankings from NAIA poll

The 1959 Southern Illinois Salukis football team was an American football team that represented Southern Illinois University (now known as Southern Illinois University Carbondale) in the Interstate Intercollegiate Athletic Conference (IIAC) during the 1959 college football season. Under first-year head coach Carmen Piccone, the team compiled a 5–4 record. The team played its home games at McAndrew Stadium in Carbondale, Illinois.

== Schedule ==
Date	Opponent	Site	Result	Attendance	Source
September 19	at Evansville*	Reitz Bowl; Evansville, IN	L 8–20	5,300	
September 26	at West Virginia State*	Charleston, WV	W 20–6	1,400	
October 3	Northern Illinois	McAndrew Stadium; Carbondale, IL	L 15–20	7,000	
October 10	at No. T–18 Western Illinois	Hanson Field; Macomb, IL	L 6–33	4,300	
October 17	Eastern Illinois^{†}	McAndrew Stadium; Carbondale, IL	W 7–0	11,500–13,000	
October 24	at Illinois State Normal	McCormick Field; Normal, IL	W 19–8	3,000	
October 30	at Eastern Michigan	Briggs Field; Ypsilanti, MI	W 41–14	600	
November 7	No. 4 Bowling Green*	McAndrew Stadium; Carbondale, IL	L 14–23	5,500	
November 14	Central Michigan	McAndrew Stadium; Carbondale, IL	W 51–20	2,000–3,000	
*Non-conference game; ^{†}Homecoming; Rankings from UPI Poll released prior to the game
