= 1959 Lafayette Leopards football team =

American college football season

1959 Lafayette Leopards football
- Conference: Middle Atlantic Conference
- University Division
- Record: 5–4 (4–3 MAC)
- Head coach: James McConlogue (2nd season)
- Captain: Donald Nikles
- Home stadium: Fisher Field

1959 Middle Atlantic Conference football standings
	Conf.					Overall
Team	W		L		T	W		L		T
University Division
Delaware x	5	–	0	–	0	8	–	1	–	0
Gettysburg	3	–	2	–	0	5	–	4	–	0
Lafayette	4	–	3	–	0	5	–	4	–	0
Bucknell	3	–	3	–	0	4	–	5	–	0
Rutgers	2	–	2	–	0	6	–	3	–	0
Lehigh	2	–	3	–	0	4	–	5	–	0
Temple	0	–	5	–	0	0	–	9	–	0
Muhlenberg *	1	–	2	–	0	3	–	6	–	0
Northern College Division
Albright x	6	–	1	–	0	7	–	3	–	0
Juniata	5	–	1	–	0	7	–	1	–	0
Wagner	5	–	1	–	0	6	–	2	–	0
Lebanon Valley	3	–	2	–	0	5	–	3	–	0
Susquehanna	3	–	2	–	0	4	–	3	–	0
Moravian	2	–	4	–	0	3	–	5	–	0
Wilkes	2	–	5	–	0	2	–	5	–	0
Lycoming	1	–	4	–	0	3	–	5	–	0
Scranton *	3	–	1	–	0	5	–	4	–	0
Southern College Division
Johns Hopkins x	6	–	0	–	0	7	–	1	–	0
Pennsylvania Military	6	–	2	–	0	6	–	2	–	0
Western Maryland	3	–	2	–	1	5	–	2	–	2
Ursinus	2	–	5	–	0	2	–	6	–	0
Dickinson	1	–	5	–	0	1	–	7	–	0
Haverford	0	–	5	–	0	1	–	5	–	0
Drexel	0	–	5	–	0	1	–	6	–	0
Franklin & Marshall *	1	–	2	–	1	4	–	3	–	1
Swarthmore *	1	–	3	–	0	2	–	5	–	0
West Chester *	0	–	0	–	0	7	–	1	–	0
x – Division champion/co-champions; * – Ineligible for championship due to insufficient conference games

The 1959 Lafayette Leopards football team was an American football team that represented Lafayette College during the 1959 college football season. Lafayette finished third in the University Division of the Middle Atlantic Conference and second in the Middle Three Conference.

In their second year under head coach James McConlogue, the Leopards compiled a 5–4 record. Donald Nikles was the team captain.

In conference play, Lafayette had the second-most wins in the University Division, with a 4–3 record against conference opponents, but placed behind Gettysburg's 3–2 in win percentage. The Leopards went 1–1 against the Middle Three, losing to Rutgers and beating Lehigh.

Lafayette played its home games at Fisher Field on College Hill in Easton, Pennsylvania.

== Schedule ==
Date	Opponent	Site	Result	Attendance	Source
September 26	at Penn*	Franklin Field; Philadelphia, PA	L 0–26	15,974	
October 3	at Muhlenberg	Muhlenberg Field; Allentown, PA	W 19–6	6,000	
October 10	No. 9 Delaware	Fisher Field; Easton, PA	L 8–26	6,000–9,000	
October 17	at Temple	Temple Stadium; Philadelphia, PA	W 52–20	6,000	
October 24	No. 11 Bucknell	Fisher Field; Easton, PA	W 12–6	8,000–9,500	
October 31	at Gettysburg	Memorial Field; Gettysburg, PA	L 13–16	3,500	
November 7	Rutgers	Fisher Field; Easton, PA	L 14–16	5,500	
November 16	Tufts*	Fisher Field; Easton, PA	W 13–0	1,500	
November 23	at Lehigh	Taylor Stadium; Bethlehem, PA (The Rivalry)	W 28–6	17,000	
*Non-conference game; Rankings from UPI Poll released prior to the game
