= 1959 New Hampshire Wildcats football team =

American college football season

1959 New Hampshire Wildcats football
- Conference: Yankee Conference
- Record: 3–3–2 (1–2–1 Yankee)
- Head coach: Chief Boston (11th season)
- Home stadium: Cowell Stadium

1959 Yankee Conference football standings
	Conf.					Overall
Team	W		L		T	W		L		T
Connecticut $	4	–	0	–	0	6	–	3	–	0
UMass	2	–	2	–	0	3	–	5	–	1
Maine	1	–	2	–	2	3	–	3	–	2
New Hampshire	1	–	2	–	1	3	–	3	–	2
Rhode Island	1	–	2	–	1	3	–	5	–	1
Vermont	0	–	1	–	0	4	–	3	–	0
$ – Conference champion

The 1959 New Hampshire Wildcats football team was an American football team that represented the University of New Hampshire as a member of the Yankee Conference during the 1959 college football season. In its 11th year under head coach Chief Boston, the team compiled a 3–3–2 record (1–2–1 against conference opponents) and tied for fourth place out of six teams in the Yankee Conference.

== Schedule ==
Date	Opponent	Site	Result	Attendance	Source
September 26	Northeastern*	Cowell Stadium; Durham, NH	W 33–14	5,200	
October 3	at Rhode Island	Meade Stadium; Kingston, RI	W 45–0	3,500–4,200	
October 10	Maine	Cowell Stadium; Durham, NH (Battle for the Brice–Cowell Musket)	T 7–7	8,500	
October 17	at No. 3 Delaware*	Delaware Stadium; Newark, DE	L 12–50	7,000–8,500	
October 24	Brandeis*	Cowell Stadium; Durham, NH	T 6–6	2,300	
October 31	at Connecticut	Memorial Stadium; Storrs, CT	L 38–39	6,049–6,200	
November 7	at Springfield (MA)*	Pratt Field; Springfield, MA	W 34–9		
November 14	UMass	Cowell Stadium; Durham, NH (rivalry)	L 6–19		
*Non-conference game; Rankings from UPI Poll released prior to the game
