= 1959 Ohio Bobcats football team =

American college football season

1959 Ohio Bobcats football
- Conference: Mid-American Conference
- Record: 7–2 (4–2 MAC)
- Head coach: Bill Hess (2nd season)
- Home stadium: Peden Stadium

1959 Mid-American Conference football standings
	Conf.					Overall
Team	W		L		T	W		L		T
No. 1 Bowling Green $	6	–	0	–	0	9	–	0	–	0
No. 9 Ohio	4	–	2	–	0	7	–	2	–	0
No. 19 Miami (OH)	3	–	2	–	0	5	–	4	–	0
Kent State	3	–	3	–	0	5	–	3	–	0
Western Michigan	3	–	3	–	0	4	–	5	–	0
Marshall	1	–	4	–	0	1	–	8	–	0
Toledo	0	–	6	–	0	2	–	6	–	1
$ – Conference champion; Rankings from UPI small college poll

The 1959 Ohio Bobcats football team was an American football team that represented Ohio University in the Mid-American Conference (MAC) during the 1959 college football season. In their second season under head coach Bill Hess, the Bobcats compiled a 7–2 record (4–2 against MAC opponents), finished in second place in the MAC, and outscored all opponents by a combined total of 215 to 101. They played their home games in Peden Stadium in Athens, Ohio.

== Schedule ==
Date	Opponent	Rank	Site	Result	Attendance	Source
September 26	at No. 19 Toledo		Glass Bowl; Toledo, OH	W 36–7	8,000	
October 3	Kent State		Peden Stadium; Athens, OH	W 46–0	7,500	
October 10	Xavier*	No. 11	Peden Stadium; Athens, OH	W 25–7	7,500	
October 17	at Youngstown State*	No. 8	Rayen Stadium; Youngstown, OH	W 44–12	8,000	
October 24	at No. 4 Miami (OH)	No. 6	Miami Field; Oxford, OH (rivalry)	L 0–24	15,000	
October 31	Western Michigan	No. 10	Peden Stadium; Athens, OH	W 12–9	10,200–12,000	
November 7	at Marshall	No. 11	Fairfield Stadium; Huntington, WV (rivalry)	W 21–14	6,000	
November 14	at Louisville*	No. 12	Fairgrounds Stadium; Louisville, KY	W 22–15	4,500	
November 21	No. 1 Bowling Green	No. 9	Peden Stadium; Athens, OH	L 9–13	12,000	
*Non-conference game; Rankings from UPI Poll released prior to the game
