= 1959 Lehigh Engineers football team =

American college football season

1959 Lehigh Engineers football
- Conference: Middle Atlantic Conference
- University Division
- Record: 4–5 (2–3 MAC)
- Head coach: Bill Leckonby (14th season)
- Captains: Edward Murphy; Alfred Richmond
- Home stadium: Taylor Stadium

1959 Middle Atlantic Conference football standings
	Conf.					Overall
Team	W		L		T	W		L		T
University Division
Delaware x	5	–	0	–	0	8	–	1	–	0
Gettysburg	3	–	2	–	0	5	–	4	–	0
Lafayette	4	–	3	–	0	5	–	4	–	0
Bucknell	3	–	3	–	0	4	–	5	–	0
Rutgers	2	–	2	–	0	6	–	3	–	0
Lehigh	2	–	3	–	0	4	–	5	–	0
Temple	0	–	5	–	0	0	–	9	–	0
Muhlenberg *	1	–	2	–	0	3	–	6	–	0
Northern College Division
Albright x	6	–	1	–	0	7	–	3	–	0
Juniata	5	–	1	–	0	7	–	1	–	0
Wagner	5	–	1	–	0	6	–	2	–	0
Lebanon Valley	3	–	2	–	0	5	–	3	–	0
Susquehanna	3	–	2	–	0	4	–	3	–	0
Moravian	2	–	4	–	0	3	–	5	–	0
Wilkes	2	–	5	–	0	2	–	5	–	0
Lycoming	1	–	4	–	0	3	–	5	–	0
Scranton *	3	–	1	–	0	5	–	4	–	0
Southern College Division
Johns Hopkins x	6	–	0	–	0	7	–	1	–	0
Pennsylvania Military	6	–	2	–	0	6	–	2	–	0
Western Maryland	3	–	2	–	1	5	–	2	–	2
Ursinus	2	–	5	–	0	2	–	6	–	0
Dickinson	1	–	5	–	0	1	–	7	–	0
Haverford	0	–	5	–	0	1	–	5	–	0
Drexel	0	–	5	–	0	1	–	6	–	0
Franklin & Marshall *	1	–	2	–	1	4	–	3	–	1
Swarthmore *	1	–	3	–	0	2	–	5	–	0
West Chester *	0	–	0	–	0	7	–	1	–	0
x – Division champion/co-champions; * – Ineligible for championship due to insufficient conference games

The 1959 Lehigh Engineers football team was an American football team that represented Lehigh University during the 1959 college football season. Lehigh finished sixth in the Middle Atlantic Conference, University Division, and last in the Middle Three Conference.

In their 14th year under head coach Bill Leckonby, the Engineers compiled a 4–5 record. Edward Murphy and Alfred Richmond were the team captains.

In conference play, Lehigh missed fourth place in the University Division by half a game, with a record of 2–3 against conference opponents, compared to Bucknell's 3–3 and Rutgers' 2–2. The Engineers went 0–2 against the Middle Three, losing to both Rutgers and Lafayette.

Lehigh played its home games at Taylor Stadium on the university campus in Bethlehem, Pennsylvania.

== Schedule ==
Date	Opponent	Site	Result	Attendance	Source
September 26	at Delaware	Delaware Stadium; Newark, DE (rivalry)	L 7–12	7,000–7,205	
October 3	at Cornell*	Schoellkopf Field; Ithaca, NY	L 6–13	10,000	
October 10	at Gettysburg*	Memorial Field; Gettysburg, PA	W 15–14	3,000–5,000	
October 17	Tufts*	Taylor Stadium; Bethlehem, PA	W 63–0	14,000	
October 24	at Rutgers	Rutgers Stadium; Piscataway, NJ	L 0–23	11,000	
October 31	Bucknell	Taylor Stadium; Bethlehem, PA	W 14–0	4,600	
November 7	VMI*	Taylor Stadium; Bethlehem, PA	L 6–7	4,500	
November 14	at Davidson*	Richardson Stadium; Davidson, NC	W 14–0	5,000	
November 21	Lafayette	Taylor Stadium; Bethlehem, PA (The Rivalry)	L 6–28	17,000	
*Non-conference game
