= 1959 Western Illinois Leathernecks football team =

American college football season

1959 Western Illinois Leathernecks football

IIAC champion
- Conference: Interstate Intercollegiate Athletic Conference
- Record: 9–0 (6–0 IIAC)
- Head coach: Lou Saban (3rd season)
- Home stadium: Hanson Field

1959 Interstate Intercollegiate Athletic Conference football standings
	Conf.					Overall
Team	W		L		T	W		L		T
No. 2 Western Illinois $	6	–	0	–	0	9	–	0	–	0
No. 17 Northern Illinois State	4	–	2	–	0	7	–	2	–	0
Central Michigan	4	–	2	–	0	7	–	3	–	0
Southern Illinois	4	–	2	–	0	5	–	4	–	0
Eastern Illinois	1	–	4	–	1	3	–	5	–	1
Eastern Michigan	1	–	5	–	0	1	–	7	–	0
Illinois State Normal	0	–	5	–	1	3	–	5	–	1
$ – Conference champion; Rankings from NAIA poll

The 1959 Western Illinois Leathernecks football team represented Western Illinois University as a member of the Interstate Intercollegiate Athletic Conference (IIAC) during the 1959 college football season. They were led by third-year head coach Lou Saban and played their home games at Hanson Field. The Leathernecks finished the season with a perfect 9–0 record overall and a 6–0 record in conference play, winning the IIAC title. Despite its record, the team was unable to participate in a postseason bowl game, as the Illinois state teachers college board banned its schools from participating in postseason sporting events.

== Schedule ==
Date	Opponent	Rank	Site	Result	Attendance	Source
September 19	at St. Ambrose*		Davenport, IA	W 40–7		
September 24	Bradley*		Hanson Field; Macomb, IL	W 56–31		
October 3	at Central Michigan		Alumni Field; Mount Pleasant, MI	W 26–20	4,800	
October 10	Southern Illinois	No. T–18	Hanson Field; Macomb, IL	W 33–6	4,300	
October 17	at Northern Illinois		Glidden Field; DeKalb, IL	W 18–13		
October 24	at Arkansas State*	No. 17	Kays Stadium; Jonesboro, AR	W 22–19		
October 31	at Eastern Illinois	No. 11	Charleston, IL	W 28–8		
November 7	Illinois State Normal	No. 10	Hanson Field; Macomb, IL	W 58–0		
November 14	Eastern Michigan	No. 9	Hanson Field; Macomb, IL	W 22–0		
*Non-conference game; Rankings from UPI Poll released prior to the game
