= 1959 Bucknell Bison football team =

American college football season

1959 Bucknell Bison football
- Conference: Middle Atlantic Conference
- University Division
- Record: 4–5 (3–3 MAC)
- Head coach: Bob Odell (2nd season)
- Captain: Larry Mathias
- Home stadium: Memorial Stadium

1959 Middle Atlantic Conference football standings
	Conf.					Overall
Team	W		L		T	W		L		T
University Division
Delaware x	5	–	0	–	0	8	–	1	–	0
Gettysburg	3	–	2	–	0	5	–	4	–	0
Lafayette	4	–	3	–	0	5	–	4	–	0
Bucknell	3	–	3	–	0	4	–	5	–	0
Rutgers	2	–	2	–	0	6	–	3	–	0
Lehigh	2	–	3	–	0	4	–	5	–	0
Temple	0	–	5	–	0	0	–	9	–	0
Muhlenberg *	1	–	2	–	0	3	–	6	–	0
Northern College Division
Albright x	6	–	1	–	0	7	–	3	–	0
Juniata	5	–	1	–	0	7	–	1	–	0
Wagner	5	–	1	–	0	6	–	2	–	0
Lebanon Valley	3	–	2	–	0	5	–	3	–	0
Susquehanna	3	–	2	–	0	4	–	3	–	0
Moravian	2	–	4	–	0	3	–	5	–	0
Wilkes	2	–	5	–	0	2	–	5	–	0
Lycoming	1	–	4	–	0	3	–	5	–	0
Scranton *	3	–	1	–	0	5	–	4	–	0
Southern College Division
Johns Hopkins x	6	–	0	–	0	7	–	1	–	0
Pennsylvania Military	6	–	2	–	0	6	–	2	–	0
Western Maryland	3	–	2	–	1	5	–	2	–	2
Ursinus	2	–	5	–	0	2	–	6	–	0
Dickinson	1	–	5	–	0	1	–	7	–	0
Haverford	0	–	5	–	0	1	–	5	–	0
Drexel	0	–	5	–	0	1	–	6	–	0
Franklin & Marshall *	1	–	2	–	1	4	–	3	–	1
Swarthmore *	1	–	3	–	0	2	–	5	–	0
West Chester *	0	–	0	–	0	7	–	1	–	0
x – Division champion/co-champions; * – Ineligible for championship due to insufficient conference games

The 1959 Bucknell Bison football team was an American football team that represented Bucknell University during the 1959 college football season. Bucknell finished fourth in the University Division of the Middle Atlantic Conference.

In its second season under head coach Bob Odell, the team compiled a 4–5 record, 3–3 against division opponents. Larry Mathias was the team captain.

Following their defeat of Rutgers, an NCAA University Division team, Bucknell earned a national No. 11 ranking in the UPI small college poll. The following week, the Bison lost to unranked Lafayette, and were pushed out of the top 20. Bucknell remained unranked through the end of the season.

The team played its home games at Memorial Stadium on the university campus in Lewisburg, Pennsylvania.

== Schedule ==
Date	Opponent	Site	Result	Attendance	Source
September 26	vs. Gettysburg	Hershey Stadium; Hershey, PA (Rotary Bowl)	W 21–0	8,500	
October 3	at Harvard*	Harvard Stadium; Boston, MA	L 6–20	9,000	
October 10	No. 5 Buffalo*	Memorial Stadium; Lewisburg, PA	W 26–21	5,000	
October 17	Rutgers^{†}	Memorial Stadium; Lewisburg, PA	W 15–8	10,000	
October 24	at Lafayette	Fisher Field; Easton, PA	L 6–12	8,000–9,500	
October 31	at Lehigh	Taylor Stadium; Bethlehem, PA	L 0–14	4,600	
November 7	at Colgate*	Colgate Athletic Field; Hamilton, NY	L 13–16	4,000	
November 14	Temple	Memorial Stadium; Lewisburg, PA	W 26–6	4,500	
November 21	No. 4 Delaware	Memorial Stadium; Lewisburg, PA	L 6–22	8,000	
*Non-conference game; ^{†}Homecoming; Rankings from UPI Poll released prior to the game
