= 1959 Delaware Fightin' Blue Hens football team =

American college football season

1959 Delaware Fightin' Blue Hens football

MAC University Division champion
- Conference: Middle Atlantic Conference
- University Division
- Record: 8–1 (5–0 MAC)
- Head coach: David M. Nelson (9th season)
- Captain: Mark Hurm
- Home stadium: Delaware Stadium

1959 Middle Atlantic Conference football standings
	Conf.					Overall
Team	W		L		T	W		L		T
University Division
Delaware x	5	–	0	–	0	8	–	1	–	0
Gettysburg	3	–	2	–	0	5	–	4	–	0
Lafayette	4	–	3	–	0	5	–	4	–	0
Bucknell	3	–	3	–	0	4	–	5	–	0
Rutgers	2	–	2	–	0	6	–	3	–	0
Lehigh	2	–	3	–	0	4	–	5	–	0
Temple	0	–	5	–	0	0	–	9	–	0
Muhlenberg *	1	–	2	–	0	3	–	6	–	0
Northern College Division
Albright x	6	–	1	–	0	7	–	3	–	0
Juniata	5	–	1	–	0	7	–	1	–	0
Wagner	5	–	1	–	0	6	–	2	–	0
Lebanon Valley	3	–	2	–	0	5	–	3	–	0
Susquehanna	3	–	2	–	0	4	–	3	–	0
Moravian	2	–	4	–	0	3	–	5	–	0
Wilkes	2	–	5	–	0	2	–	5	–	0
Lycoming	1	–	4	–	0	3	–	5	–	0
Scranton *	3	–	1	–	0	5	–	4	–	0
Southern College Division
Johns Hopkins x	6	–	0	–	0	7	–	1	–	0
Pennsylvania Military	6	–	2	–	0	6	–	2	–	0
Western Maryland	3	–	2	–	1	5	–	2	–	2
Ursinus	2	–	5	–	0	2	–	6	–	0
Dickinson	1	–	5	–	0	1	–	7	–	0
Haverford	0	–	5	–	0	1	–	5	–	0
Drexel	0	–	5	–	0	1	–	6	–	0
Franklin & Marshall *	1	–	2	–	1	4	–	3	–	1
Swarthmore *	1	–	3	–	0	2	–	5	–	0
West Chester *	0	–	0	–	0	7	–	1	–	0
x – Division champion/co-champions; * – Ineligible for championship due to insufficient conference games

The 1959 Delaware Fightin' Blue Hens football team was an American football team that represented the University of Delaware in the Middle Atlantic Conference during the 1959 college football season. In its ninth season under head coach David M. Nelson, the team compiled an 8–1 record (5–0 against MAC opponents) and outscored opponents by a total of 286 to 95. Mark Hurm was the team captain.

The Blue Hens started the year unranked, but early victories over Lafayette, Lehigh and Massachusetts catapulted them into the UPI small college poll's national top 3 by mid-October. Delaware held the No. 1 spot for two weeks in November before ceding it to Bowling Green in a head-to-head matchup. Delaware dropped to No. 4, and remained at that rank through the end of the season.

The team played its home games at Delaware Stadium in Newark, Delaware.

== Schedule ==
Date	Opponent	Rank	Site	Result	Attendance	Source
September 26	Lehigh		Delaware Stadium; Newark, DE (rivalry)	W 12–7	7,000–7,205	
October 3	at UMass*	No. T–16	Alumni Field; Amherst, MA	W 42–12	4,500	
October 10	at Lafayette	No. 9	Fisher Field; Easton, PA	W 26–8	6,000–9,000	
October 17	New Hampshire^{†}*	No. 3	Delaware Stadium; Newark, DE	W 50–12	7,000–8,500	
October 24	Marshall*	No. 2	Delaware Stadium; Newark, DE	W 30–6	4,896–5,809	
October 31	Rutgers	No. 2	Rutgers Stadium; Piscataway, NJ	W 34–14	10,500	
November 7	Temple	No. 1	Delaware Stadium; Newark, DE	W 62–0	2,000–4,500	
November 14	at No. 3 Bowling Green*	No. 1	University Stadium; Bowling Green, OH	L 8–30	8,700	
November 21	at Bucknell	No. 4	Memorial Stadium; Lewisburg, PA	W 22–6	8,000	
*Non-conference game; ^{†}Homecoming; Rankings from UPI Poll released prior to the game
