= 1959 Kent State Golden Flashes football team =

American college football season

1959 Kent State Golden Flashes football
- Conference: Mid-American Conference
- Record: 5–3 (3–3 MAC)
- Head coach: Trevor J. Rees (14th season)
- Home stadium: Memorial Stadium

1959 Mid-American Conference football standings
	Conf.					Overall
Team	W		L		T	W		L		T
No. 1 Bowling Green $	6	–	0	–	0	9	–	0	–	0
No. 9 Ohio	4	–	2	–	0	7	–	2	–	0
No. 19 Miami (OH)	3	–	2	–	0	5	–	4	–	0
Kent State	3	–	3	–	0	5	–	3	–	0
Western Michigan	3	–	3	–	0	4	–	5	–	0
Marshall	1	–	4	–	0	1	–	8	–	0
Toledo	0	–	6	–	0	2	–	6	–	1
$ – Conference champion; Rankings from UPI small college poll

The 1959 Kent State Golden Flashes football team was an American football team that represented Kent State University in the Mid-American Conference (MAC) during the 1959 college football season. In their 14th season under head coach Trevor J. Rees, the Golden Flashes compiled a 5–3 record (3–3 against MAC opponents), finished in fourth place in the MAC, and outscored all opponents by a combined total of 144 to 124.

The team's statistical leaders included John Martin with 391 rushing yards, Dick Mostardo with 164 passing yards, and Lou Perry with 141 receiving yards.

== Schedule ==
Date	Opponent	Rank	Site	Result	Attendance	Source
September 25	Baldwin–Wallace*		Memorial Stadium; Kent, OH	W 46–12		
October 3	at Ohio		Peden Stadium; Athens, OH	L 0–46	7,500	
October 10	No. 2 Miami (OH)		Memorial Stadium; Kent, OH	W 14–6	9,500	
October 17	at Marshall	No. 18	Fairfield Stadium; Huntington, WV	W 46–7		
October 24	No. 8 Bowling Green	No. T–15	Memorial Stadium; Kent, OH (rivalry)	L 8–25	11,000	
October 31	at Toledo		Glass Bowl; Toledo, OH	W 14–7	2,000	
November 7	at Western Michigan		Waldo Stadium; Kalamazoo, MI	L 0–7	6,500	
November 21	Louisville*		Memorial Stadium; Kent, OH	W 16–14		
*Non-conference game; Rankings from UPI Poll released prior to the game
