= 1959 Rutgers Scarlet Knights football team =

American college football season

1959 Rutgers Scarlet Knights football

Middle Three champion
- Conference: Middle Atlantic Conference
- University Division
- Record: 6–3 (2–2 MAC University)
- Head coach: John Stiegman (4th season)
- Captain: Robert Simms
- Home stadium: Rutgers Stadium

1959 Middle Atlantic Conference football standings
	Conf.					Overall
Team	W		L		T	W		L		T
University Division
Delaware x	5	–	0	–	0	8	–	1	–	0
Gettysburg	3	–	2	–	0	5	–	4	–	0
Lafayette	4	–	3	–	0	5	–	4	–	0
Bucknell	3	–	3	–	0	4	–	5	–	0
Rutgers	2	–	2	–	0	6	–	3	–	0
Lehigh	2	–	3	–	0	4	–	5	–	0
Temple	0	–	5	–	0	0	–	9	–	0
Muhlenberg *	1	–	2	–	0	3	–	6	–	0
Northern College Division
Albright x	6	–	1	–	0	7	–	3	–	0
Juniata	5	–	1	–	0	7	–	1	–	0
Wagner	5	–	1	–	0	6	–	2	–	0
Lebanon Valley	3	–	2	–	0	5	–	3	–	0
Susquehanna	3	–	2	–	0	4	–	3	–	0
Moravian	2	–	4	–	0	3	–	5	–	0
Wilkes	2	–	5	–	0	2	–	5	–	0
Lycoming	1	–	4	–	0	3	–	5	–	0
Scranton *	3	–	1	–	0	5	–	4	–	0
Southern College Division
Johns Hopkins x	6	–	0	–	0	7	–	1	–	0
Pennsylvania Military	6	–	2	–	0	6	–	2	–	0
Western Maryland	3	–	2	–	1	5	–	2	–	2
Ursinus	2	–	5	–	0	2	–	6	–	0
Dickinson	1	–	5	–	0	1	–	7	–	0
Haverford	0	–	5	–	0	1	–	5	–	0
Drexel	0	–	5	–	0	1	–	6	–	0
Franklin & Marshall *	1	–	2	–	1	4	–	3	–	1
Swarthmore *	1	–	3	–	0	2	–	5	–	0
West Chester *	0	–	0	–	0	7	–	1	–	0
x – Division champion/co-champions; * – Ineligible for championship due to insufficient conference games

The 1959 Rutgers Scarlet Knights football team represented Rutgers University in the 1959 college football season. In their fourth and final season under head coach John Stiegman, the Scarlet Knights compiled a 6–3 record, won the Middle Three Conference championship, and outscored their opponents 132 to 121. Rutgers finished fifth in the Middle Atlantic Conference, University Division, with a 2–2 record in conference play.

The team's statistical leaders included Sam Mudie with 339 passing yards, Jim Rogers with 161 rushing yards, and Bob Simms with 345 receiving yards.

The Scarlet Knights played their home games in Rutgers Stadium, in Piscataway, New Jersey, across the river from Rutgers' New Brunswick main campus.

== Schedule ==
Date	Opponent	Site	Result	Attendance	Source
September 26	at Princeton*	Palmer Stadium; Princeton, NJ (rivalry)	W 8–6	36,000	
October 3	Connecticut*	Rutgers Stadium; Piscataway, NJ	W 20–8	7,500	
October 10	Colgate*	Rutgers Stadium; Piscataway, NJ	W 15–12	14,000	
October 17	at Bucknell	Memorial Stadium; Lewisburg, PA	L 8–15	10,000	
October 24	Lehigh	Rutgers Stadium; Piscataway, NJ	W 23–0	11,000	
October 31	Delaware	Rutgers Stadium; Piscataway, NJ	L 14–34	10,500	
November 7	at Lafayette	Fisher Field; Easton, PA	W 16–14	5,500	
November 14	Villanova*	Rutgers Stadium; Piscataway, NJ	W 12–6	14,500	
November 21	at Columbia*	Baker Field; New York, NY	L 16–26	12,000	
*Non-conference game
