= 1959 Central Michigan Chippewas football team =

American college football season

1959 Central Michigan Chippewas football
- Conference: Interstate Intercollegiate Athletic Conference
- Record: 7–3 (4–2 IIAC)
- Head coach: Kenneth Kelly (9th season)
- MVP: Walter Beach
- Captain: Al Bernardi
- Home stadium: Alumni Field

1959 Interstate Intercollegiate Athletic Conference football standings
	Conf.					Overall
Team	W		L		T	W		L		T
No. 2 Western Illinois $	6	–	0	–	0	9	–	0	–	0
No. 17 Northern Illinois State	4	–	2	–	0	7	–	2	–	0
Central Michigan	4	–	2	–	0	7	–	3	–	0
Southern Illinois	4	–	2	–	0	5	–	4	–	0
Eastern Illinois	1	–	4	–	1	3	–	5	–	1
Eastern Michigan	1	–	5	–	0	1	–	7	–	0
Illinois State Normal	0	–	5	–	1	3	–	5	–	1
$ – Conference champion; Rankings from NAIA poll

The 1959 Central Michigan Chippewas (football team) represented Central Michigan University in the Interstate Intercollegiate Athletic Conference (IIAC) during the 1959 college football season. In their ninth season under head coach Kenneth Kelly, the Chippewas compiled a 7–3 record (4–2 against IIAC opponents) and outscored their opponents by a combined total of 233 to 155.

The team's statistical leaders included Oarie Lemanski with 962 passing yards and Jerry O'Neil with 821 rushing yards and 296 receiving yards. Halfback Walter Beach received the team's most valuable player award for the second consecutive year. No Central Michigan players received first-team honors on the All-IIAC team.

== Schedule ==
Date	Opponent	Rank	Site	Result	Attendance	Source
September 12	vs. Bolling Air Force*		Arthur Hill Stadium; Saginaw, MI	L 13–19	9,000	
September 19	Western Michigan*		Alumni Field; Mount Pleasant, MI (rivalry)	W 21–15	5,800–7,000	
September 25	at Drake*	No. T–20	Drake Stadium; Des Moines, IA	W 41–21	4,500	
October 3	Western Illinois		Alumni Field; Mount Pleasant, MI	L 20–26	4,800	
October 10	at Illinois State Normal		Normal, IL	W 22–0	1,000	
October 17	at Eastern Michigan		Briggs Field; Ypsilanti, MI (rivalry)	W 21–8	5,000	
October 24	Northern Illinois^{†}		Alumni Field; Mount Pleasant, MI	W 29–7	9,000	
October 31	Northern Michigan*		Alumni Field; Mount Pleasant, MI	W 20–8	3,200	
November 7	Eastern Illinois		Alumni Field; Mount Pleasant, MI	W 26–0	3,400–3,500	
November 14	Southern Illinois		Alumni Field; Mount Pleasant, MI	L 20–51	2,000–3,000	
*Non-conference game; ^{†}Homecoming; Rankings from UPI Poll released prior to the game
