= 1959 Toledo Rockets football team =

American college football season

1959 Toledo Rockets football
- Conference: Mid-American Conference
- Record: 2–6–1 (0–6 MAC)
- Head coach: Harry Larche (3rd season)
- Home stadium: Glass Bowl

1959 Mid-American Conference football standings
| | Conf. | | | | | Overall |
| Team | W | | L | | T | W | | L | | T |
|---|---|---|---|---|---|---|---|---|---|---|
| No. 1 Bowling Green $ | 6 | – | 0 | – | 0 | 9 | – | 0 | – | 0 |
| No. 9 Ohio | 4 | – | 2 | – | 0 | 7 | – | 2 | – | 0 |
| No. 19 Miami (OH) | 3 | – | 2 | – | 0 | 5 | – | 4 | – | 0 |
| Kent State | 3 | – | 3 | – | 0 | 5 | – | 3 | – | 0 |
| Western Michigan | 3 | – | 3 | – | 0 | 4 | – | 5 | – | 0 |
| Marshall | 1 | – | 4 | – | 0 | 1 | – | 8 | – | 0 |
| Toledo | 0 | – | 6 | – | 0 | 2 | – | 6 | – | 1 |
$ – Conference champion; Rankings from UPI small college poll

The 1959 Toledo Rockets football team was an American football team that represented Toledo University in the Mid-American Conference (MAC) during the 1959 college football season. In their third and final season under head coach Harry Larche, the Rockets compiled a 2–6–1 record (0–6 against MAC opponents), finished in seventh place in the MAC, and were outscored by their opponents by a combined total of 200 to 123.

The team's statistical leaders included Dennis Wilkie with 723 passing yards, Occie Burt with 437 rushing yards, and Bob Smith with 455 receiving yards.

== Schedule ==
| Date | Opponent | Rank | Site | Result | Attendance | Source |
|---|---|---|---|---|---|---|
| September 19 | Eastern Kentucky* | | Glass Bowl; Toledo, OH | W 20–2 | 5,000 | |
| September 26 | Ohio | No. 19 | Glass Bowl; Toledo, OH | L 7–36 | 8,000 | |
| October 3 | Baldwin–Wallace* | | Glass Bowl; Toledo, OH | W 26–20 | 5,500 | |
| October 10 | Marshall | | Glass Bowl; Toledo, OH | L 13–20 | 1,000 | |
| October 17 | at No. 11 Bowling Green | | University Stadium; Bowling Green, OH (rivalry) | L 21–51 | 4,500 | |
| October 24 | Western Michigan | | Glass Bowl; Toledo, OH | L 14–24 | 3,200 | |
| October 31 | Kent State | | Glass Bowl; Toledo, OH | L 7–14 | 2,000 | |
| November 7 | at No. 7 Miami (OH) | | Miami Field; Oxford, OH | L 7–25 | 8,500 | |
| November 12 | at Youngstown State* | | Rayen Stadium; Youngstown, OH | T 8–8 | 4,000 | |
*Non-conference game; Rankings from UPI Poll released prior to the game

== After the season ==
=== NFL draft ===
The following Rocket was selected in the 1960 NFL draft following the season.

| Round | Pick | Player | Position | NFL club |
|---|---|---|---|---|
| 19 | 224 | Jack Campbell | End | Cleveland Browns |
