= 1959 Vermont Catamounts football team =

American college football season

1959 Vermont Catamounts football
- Conference: Yankee Conference
- Record: 4–3 (0–1 Yankee)
- Head coach: J. Edward Donnelly (8th season)
- Home stadium: Centennial Field

1959 Yankee Conference football standings
	Conf.					Overall
Team	W		L		T	W		L		T
Connecticut $	4	–	0	–	0	6	–	3	–	0
UMass	2	–	2	–	0	3	–	5	–	1
Maine	1	–	2	–	2	3	–	3	–	2
New Hampshire	1	–	2	–	1	3	–	3	–	2
Rhode Island	1	–	2	–	1	3	–	5	–	1
Vermont	0	–	1	–	0	4	–	3	–	0
$ – Conference champion

The 1959 Vermont Catamounts football team was an American football team that represented the University of Vermont in the Yankee Conference during the 1959 college football season. In their eighth year under head coach J. Edward Donnelly, the team compiled a 4–3 record.

== Schedule ==
Date	Opponent	Site	Result	Attendance	Source
September 26	Coast Guard*	Centennial Field; Burlington, VT	W 34–6	5,500	
October 3	at Maine	Alumni Field; Orono, ME	L 14–52	5,000–5,200	
October 10	Hobart*	Centennial Field; Burlington, VT	W 31–6	4,500	
October 17	Rochester*^{†}	Centennial Field; Burlington, VT	L 6–27	3,000–4,000	
October 24	Norwich*	Centennial Field; Burlington, VT	W 7–0	5,000–6,500	
October 31	at St. Lawrence*	Weeks Field; Canton, NY	W 20–14	2,000	
November 7	at Middlebury*	Porter Field; Middlebury, VT	L 0–28	3,200	
*Non-conference game; ^{†}Homecoming
