= 1959 Drexel Dragons football team =

American college football season

1959 Drexel Dragons football
- Conference: Middle Atlantic Conference
- College–Southern Division
- Record: 1–6 (0–5 MAC)
- Head coach: Jack Hinkle (2nd season)
- Captains: Tom O'Connor; Mike Piernock
- Home stadium: Drexel Field

1959 Middle Atlantic Conference football standings
	Conf.					Overall
Team	W		L		T	W		L		T
University Division
Delaware x	5	–	0	–	0	8	–	1	–	0
Gettysburg	3	–	2	–	0	5	–	4	–	0
Lafayette	4	–	3	–	0	5	–	4	–	0
Bucknell	3	–	3	–	0	4	–	5	–	0
Rutgers	2	–	2	–	0	6	–	3	–	0
Lehigh	2	–	3	–	0	4	–	5	–	0
Temple	0	–	5	–	0	0	–	9	–	0
Muhlenberg *	1	–	2	–	0	3	–	6	–	0
Northern College Division
Albright x	6	–	1	–	0	7	–	3	–	0
Juniata	5	–	1	–	0	7	–	1	–	0
Wagner	5	–	1	–	0	6	–	2	–	0
Lebanon Valley	3	–	2	–	0	5	–	3	–	0
Susquehanna	3	–	2	–	0	4	–	3	–	0
Moravian	2	–	4	–	0	3	–	5	–	0
Wilkes	2	–	5	–	0	2	–	5	–	0
Lycoming	1	–	4	–	0	3	–	5	–	0
Scranton *	3	–	1	–	0	5	–	4	–	0
Southern College Division
Johns Hopkins x	6	–	0	–	0	7	–	1	–	0
Pennsylvania Military	6	–	2	–	0	6	–	2	–	0
Western Maryland	3	–	2	–	1	5	–	2	–	2
Ursinus	2	–	5	–	0	2	–	6	–	0
Dickinson	1	–	5	–	0	1	–	7	–	0
Haverford	0	–	5	–	0	1	–	5	–	0
Drexel	0	–	5	–	0	1	–	6	–	0
Franklin & Marshall *	1	–	2	–	1	4	–	3	–	1
Swarthmore *	1	–	3	–	0	2	–	5	–	0
West Chester *	0	–	0	–	0	7	–	1	–	0
x – Division champion/co-champions; * – Ineligible for championship due to insufficient conference games

The 1959 Drexel Dragons football team represented the Drexel Institute of Technology (renamed Drexel University in 1970) as a member of the Middle Atlantic Conference during the 1959 college football season. Jack Hinkle was the team's head coach.

== Schedule ==
Date	Time	Opponent	Site	Result	Attendance	Source
September 26	8:00 pm	at Albright	Reading, PA	L 12–23	4,000	
October 3	1:30 pm	Gettysburg*	Drexel Field; Philadelphia, PA	L 12–36	3,000	
October 10	1:30 pm	Scranton	Drexel Field; Philadelphia, PA	L 0–28	2,000	
October 24	1:30 pm	at Pennsylvania Military	Chester, PA	L 7–20	3,500	
October 31	1:30 pm	Temple*^{†}	Drexel Field; Philadelphia, PA	W 12–8	2,500–5,000	
November 7	1:30 pm	Juniata	Drexel Field; Philadelphia, PA	L 0–47	1,000	
November 14	1:30 pm	at Western Maryland	Hoffa Field; Westminster, MD	L 6–26	3,000	
*Non-conference game; ^{†}Homecoming; All times are in Eastern time

== Roster ==
1959 Drexel Dragons football team roster
Players
Coaches
Offense

Pos.	#	Name	Class
TE		Ray Miller
TE		Bob Saracein
TE		Cliff Dirkes
TE		Jack Geary
TE		Skip Becker
OT		Jim Valentine
OT		Frank Garofolo
OT		Walt Danz
OT		Dick Kohl
G		Pete Gable
G		Mike Dobulewicz
C		Dick Frazier
C		Jerry Humphrey
C		John McGovern
C		George Kelley
HB		Frank Bell
HB		Butch Lewoc
HB		Harry O'Neil
HB		Ken Suter
HB		Knobbe Deitz
HB		Jack Salvucci
FB		Tom O'Connor (C)
FB		Mike Piernock
FB		Pat Brett
QB		Jim Holden
QB		Tony DiGiovacchino
QB		George Carter

Defense

Pos.	#	Name	Class

Special teams

Pos.	#	Name	Class

Head coach

- Jack Hinkle (Syracuse)

Coordinators/assistant coaches

- Ben Kish (Pittsburgh)
- Don Shank (Penn State)

Legend

- (C) Team captain
- (S) Suspended
- (I) Ineligible
- Injured
- Redshirt
