= 1959 UMass Redmen football team =

American college football season

1959 UMass Redmen football
- Conference: Yankee Conference
- Record: 3–5–1 (2–2 Yankee)
- Head coach: Charlie O'Rourke (8th season)
- Home stadium: Alumni Field

1959 Yankee Conference football standings
	Conf.					Overall
Team	W		L		T	W		L		T
Connecticut $	4	–	0	–	0	6	–	3	–	0
UMass	2	–	2	–	0	3	–	5	–	1
Maine	1	–	2	–	2	3	–	3	–	2
New Hampshire	1	–	2	–	1	3	–	3	–	2
Rhode Island	1	–	2	–	1	3	–	5	–	1
Vermont	0	–	1	–	0	4	–	3	–	0
$ – Conference champion

The 1959 UMass Redmen football team represented the University of Massachusetts Amherst in the 1959 college football season as a member of the Yankee Conference. The team was coached by Charlie O'Rourke and played its home games at Alumni Field in Amherst, Massachusetts. The 1959 season was O'Rourke's last as coach of the Minutemen. UMass finished the season with a record of 3–5–1 overall and 2–2 in conference play.

== Schedule ==
Date	Opponent	Rank	Site	Result	Attendance	Source
September 19	Maine		Alumni Field; Amherst, MA	W 21–16	5,250–6,000	
September 26	at Harvard*		Harvard Stadium; Boston, MA	L 22–36	11,500	
October 3	Delaware*	No. T–16	Alumni Field; Amherst, MA	L 12–42	4,500–4,879	
October 10	at Connecticut		Memorial Stadium; Storrs, CT (rivalry)	L 0–26	9,147	
October 17	Rhode Island^{†}		Alumni Field; Amherst, MA	L 6–30	6,478–6,500	
October 24	at Northeastern*		Kent Street Field; Brookline, MA	T 0–0	1,100	
October 31	at Boston University*		Nickerson Field; Boston, MA	L 6–20	2,896	
November 7	Brandeis*		Alumni Field; Amherst, MA	W 25–6	2,744	
November 14	at New Hampshire		Cowell Stadium; Durham, NH (rivalry)	W 19–6	6,200	
*Non-conference game; ^{†}Homecoming; Rankings from UPI Poll released prior to the game
