= 1959 Miami Redskins football team =

American college football season

1959 Miami Redskins football
- Conference: Mid-American Conference
- Record: 5–4 (3–2 MAC)
- Head coach: John Pont (4th season)
- Captains: James Daniels; Dave Girbert
- Home stadium: Miami Field

1959 Mid-American Conference football standings
	Conf.					Overall
Team	W		L		T	W		L		T
No. 1 Bowling Green $	6	–	0	–	0	9	–	0	–	0
No. 9 Ohio	4	–	2	–	0	7	–	2	–	0
No. 19 Miami (OH)	3	–	2	–	0	5	–	4	–	0
Kent State	3	–	3	–	0	5	–	3	–	0
Western Michigan	3	–	3	–	0	4	–	5	–	0
Marshall	1	–	4	–	0	1	–	8	–	0
Toledo	0	–	6	–	0	2	–	6	–	1
$ – Conference champion; Rankings from UPI small college poll

The 1959 Miami Redskins football team was an American football team that represented Miami University in the Mid-American Conference (MAC) during the 1959 college football season. In its fourth season under head coach John Pont, Miami compiled a 5–4 record (3–2 against MAC opponents), finished in third place in the MAC, held five of nine opponents to seven or fewer points, and outscored all opponents by a combined total of 158 to 94.

James Daniels and Dave Girbert were the team captains. Girbert led the team with 332 rushing yards. Other statistical leaders included Thomas Kilmurray with 454 passing yards and Howie Millisor with 132 receiving yards.

== Schedule ==
Date	Opponent	Rank	Site	Result	Attendance	Source
September 26	at Western Michigan	No. 6	Waldo Stadium; Kalamazoo, MI	W 21–0	12,000	
October 3	Xavier*	No. 2	Miami Field; Oxford, OH	W 33–7	13,000	
October 10	at Kent State	No. 2	Memorial Stadium; Kent, OH	L 6–14	9,500	
October 17	Villanova*	No. 5	Miami Field; Oxford, OH	W 26–6	10,000	
October 24	No. 6 Ohio	No. 4	Miami Field; Oxford, OH (rivalry)	W 24–0	15,000	
October 31	at No. 6 Bowling Green	No. 3	University Stadium; Bowling Green, OH	L 16–33	9,400	
November 7	Toledo	No. 7	Miami Field; Oxford, OH	W 25–7	8,500	
November 14	at Dayton*	No. 8	UD Stadium; Dayton, OH	L 0–13	6,000	
November 26	at Cincinnati*	No. 19	Nippert Stadium; Cincinnati, OH (rivalry)	L 7–14	20,000	
*Non-conference game; Rankings from UPI Poll released prior to the game
