= 1959 Maine Black Bears football team =

American college football season

1959 Maine Black Bears football
- Conference: Yankee Conference, Maine Intercollegiate Athletic Association
- Record: 3–3–2 (1–2–2 Yankee, 2–1 MIAA)
- Head coach: Harold Westerman (9th season)
- Captains: Robert Bragg; John Welch
- Home stadium: Alumni Field

1959 Yankee Conference football standings
	Conf.					Overall
Team	W		L		T	W		L		T
Connecticut $	4	–	0	–	0	6	–	3	–	0
UMass	2	–	2	–	0	3	–	5	–	1
Maine	1	–	2	–	2	3	–	3	–	2
New Hampshire	1	–	2	–	1	3	–	3	–	2
Rhode Island	1	–	2	–	1	3	–	5	–	1
Vermont	0	–	1	–	0	4	–	3	–	0
$ – Conference champion

The 1959 Maine Black Bears football team was an American football team that represented the University of Maine as a member of the Yankee Conference and Maine Intercollegiate Athletic Association during the 1959 college football season. In its ninth season under head coach Harold Westerman, the team compiled a 3–3–2 record (1–2–2 against Yankee Conference and 2–1 against MIAA opponents) and finished second out of the six teams in the Yankee Conference. The team played its home games at Alumni Field in Orono, Maine. Robert Bragg and John Welch were the team captains.

The team's statistical leaders included halfback David Cloutier with 534 rushing yards and 38 points scored (six touchdowns and one two-point conversion); quarterback Manchester Wheeler with 293 passing yards; and end Maurice Dore with 197 receiving yards.

== Schedule ==
Date	Opponent	Site	Result	Attendance	Source
September 19	at UMass	Alumni Field; Amherst, MA	L 16–21	5,250–6,000	
September 26	at Rhode Island	Meade Stadium; Kingston, RI	T 0–0	3,227–3,500	
October 3	Vermont	Alumni Field; Orono, ME	W 52–14	5,000–5,200	
October 10	at New Hampshire	Cowell Stadium; Durham, NH (rivalry)	T 7–7	8,500	
October 17	Connecticut	Alumni Field; Orono, ME	L 15–18	5,800	
October 24	at Bates	Garcelon Field; Lewiston, ME	W 12–0	2,000	
October 31	at Colby	Seaverns Field; Waterville, ME	L 6–14	5,000	
November 7	Bowdoin	Alumni Field; Orono, ME	W 18–8	6,800	
