= Carmen Piccone =

American football player and coach (1929–2005)

Biographical details
- Born: August 19, 1929; Philadelphia, Pennsylvania, U.S.
- Died: July 10, 2005 (aged 75); Wynnewood, Pennsylvania, U.S.

Playing career
- 1951–1953: Temple
- Position: Quarterback

Coaching career (HC unless noted)
- 1954: Temple (assistant)
- 1955–1958: Southern Illinois (assistant)
- 1959–1963: Southern Illinois
- 1964–1965: VMI (backfield)
- 1966: Cornell (offensive backfield)
- 1967–1974: Cornell (OC)
- 1975–1976: Trenton State

Head coaching record
- Overall: 36–28–1

Accomplishments and honors

Championships
- 2 IIAC (1960–1961)

Carmen A. Piccone (August 19, 1929 – July 10, 2005) was an American football coach. He served as the head football coach at Southern Illinois University Carbondale from 1959 to 1963 and at Trenton State College—now known as The College of New Jersey—from 1975 to 1976, compiling a career college football coaching record of 36–28–1.

== Head coaching record ==
Year	Team	Overall	Conference	Standing	Bowl/playoffs
Southern Illinois Salukis (Interstate Intercollegiate Athletic Conference) (1959–1961)
1959	Southern Illinois	5–4	4–2	T–2nd	
1960	Southern Illinois	8–2	6–0	1st	
1961	Southern Illinois	7–3	5–1	1st	
Southern Illinois Salukis (NCAA College Division independent) (1962–1963)
1962	Southern Illinois	4–6			
1963	Southern Illinois	4–5			
Southern Illinois:		28–20	15–3		
Trenton State Lions (New Jersey State Athletic Conference) (1975–1976)
1975	Trenton State	5–4	3–2	3rd	
1976	Trenton State	3–4–1	2–2–1	T–3rd	
Trenton State:		8–8–1	5–4–1		
Total:		36–28–1			
National championship Conference title Conference division title or championship game berth
