= 1959 Bowling Green Falcons football team =

American college football season

1959 Bowling Green Falcons football

UPI small college national champion MAC champion
- Conference: Mid-American Conference
- Record: 9–0 (6–0 MAC)
- Head coach: Doyt Perry (5th season)
- MVP: Bob Colburn
- Captains: Bob Colburn; Bob Zimpfer
- Home stadium: University Stadium

1959 Mid-American Conference football standings
	Conf.					Overall
Team	W		L		T	W		L		T
No. 1 Bowling Green $	6	–	0	–	0	9	–	0	–	0
No. 9 Ohio	4	–	2	–	0	7	–	2	–	0
No. 19 Miami (OH)	3	–	2	–	0	5	–	4	–	0
Kent State	3	–	3	–	0	5	–	3	–	0
Western Michigan	3	–	3	–	0	4	–	5	–	0
Marshall	1	–	4	–	0	1	–	8	–	0
Toledo	0	–	6	–	0	2	–	6	–	1
$ – Conference champion; Rankings from UPI small college poll

The 1959 Bowling Green Falcons football team was an American football team that represented Bowling Green State University in the Mid-American Conference (MAC) during the 1959 college football season. In their fifth season under head coach Doyt Perry, the Falcons compiled a perfect 9–0 record (6–0 against MAC opponents), won the MAC championship, and outscored opponents by a combined total of 274 to 83. The team was voted by the United Press International Board of Coaches as the 1959 national small college champion. The team was inducted as a group into the Bowling Green Hall of Fame in 2013.

The team's statistical leaders were Bob Colburn with 788 passing yards, Chuck Comer with 361 rushing yards, and Bernie Casey with 264 receiving yards. Colburn and tackle Bob Zimpfer were selected by the UPI as first-team All-Ohio players. Colburn received the team's Most Valuable Player award. Jack Harbaugh, who later gained fame as a football coach, set a school record with three interceptions in the November 14 game against No. 1 Delaware.

== Schedule ==
Date	Opponent	Rank	Site	Result	Attendance	Source
September 26	at Marshall		Fairfield Stadium; Huntington, WV	W 51–7	4,000	
October 3	Dayton*	No. 14	University Stadium; Bowling Green, OH	W 14–0	7,500	
October 10	Western Michigan	No. 17	University Stadium; Bowling Green, OH	W 34–0	9,500	
October 17	Toledo	No. 11	University Stadium; Bowling Green, OH (rivalry)	W 51–21	4,500	
October 24	at No. T–15 Kent State	No. 8	Memorial Stadium; Kent, OH (rivalry)	W 25–8	11,000	
October 31	Miami (OH)	No. 6	University Stadium; Bowling Green, OH	W 33–16	9,400	
November 7	at Southern Illinois*	No. 4	McAndrew Stadium; Carbondale, IL	W 23–14	5,500	
November 14	No. 1 Delaware*	No. 3	University Stadium; Bowling Green, OH	W 30–8	8,700	
November 21	at No. 9 Ohio	No. 1	Peden Stadium; Athens, OH	W 13–9	12,000	
*Non-conference game; Rankings from UPI Poll released prior to the game

== See also ==
- NCAA Division II Football Championship
