= Al Day =

American football player (1938–1979)

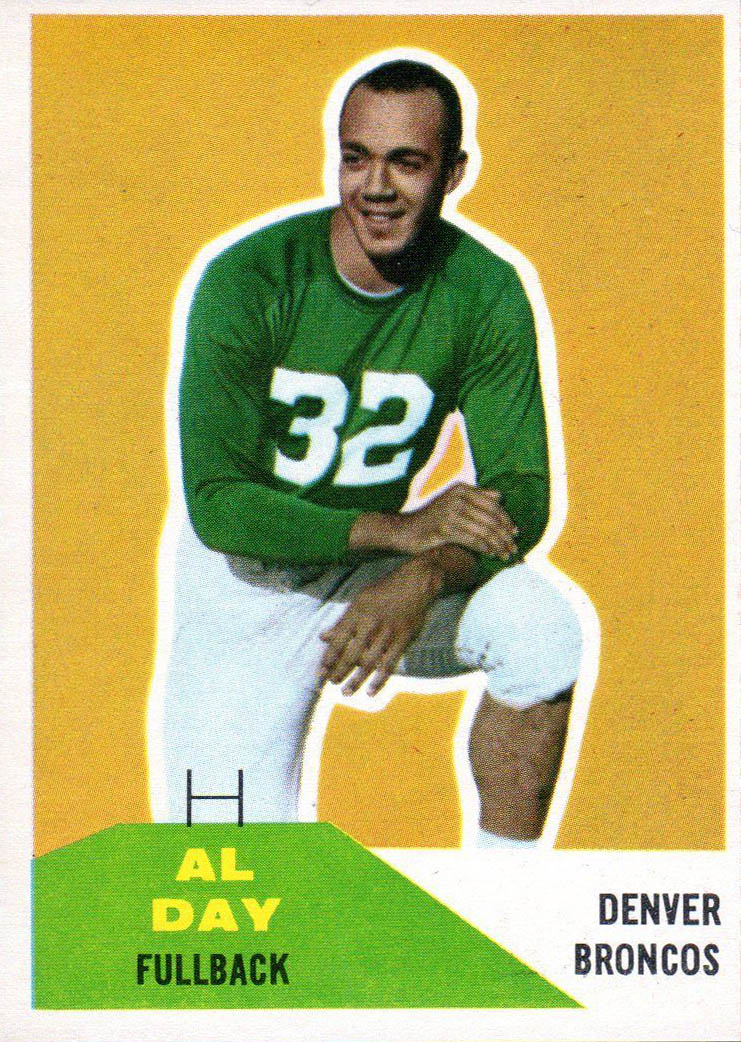

No. 84
- Position: Linebacker

Personal information
- Born: March 18, 1938; Detroit, Michigan, U.S.
- Died: April 26, 1979 (aged 41); Detroit, Michigan, U.S.
- Listed height: 6 ft 2 in (1.88 m)
- Listed weight: 216 lb (98 kg)

Career information
- High school: Pershing (Detroit)
- College: Eastern Michigan (1956–1959)
- NFL draft: 1960: undrafted

Career history
- Denver Broncos (1960)
- Stats at Pro Football Reference

Albert Edward Day (March 18, 1938 – April 26, 1979) was an American professional football linebacker who played for the Denver Broncos of the American Football League (AFL). He played college football at Eastern Michigan College.

== Early life ==
Albert Edward Day was born on March 16, 1938, in Detroit, Michigan. He attended Pershing High School in Detroit.

== College career ==
Day played college football at Eastern Michigan College, where he was a four-year letterman for the Eastern Michigan Hurons from 1956 to 1959. He first played end on offense before being switched to fullback in 1958. He was a guard/linebacker on defense. Day quit the team on October 20, 1958, stating "Football has become too much of a grind and too much trouble." However, he later returned. On May 29, 1959, Day was arrested for window peeping at an Eastern Michigan coed dorm, and fined $25. Later that day, he was sentenced to 30 days in jail after failing to pay the fine. As a senior in 1959, Day earned All-Interstate Intercollegiate Athletic Conference honors on defense. He was named team MVP that year as well. He also participated in track and field at Eastern Michigan as a shot putter.

== Professional career ==
On May 13, 1960, it was reported that Day had signed with the Denver Broncos of the American Football League. He played in all 14 games, starting seven, for the Broncos during the team's inaugural 1960 season and posted two sacks. Denver finished the year with a 4–9–1 record. Day was listed as a linebacker while with the Broncos.

== Personal life ==
Day died on April 26, 1979, in Detroit.
