= Howdy Myers =

Biographical details
- Born: August 23, 1910
- Died: February 12, 1980 (aged 69); Baltimore, Maryland, U.S.

Coaching career (HC unless noted)

Football
- 1946–1949: Johns Hopkins
- 1950–1974: Hofstra
- 1979: Johns Hopkins

Basketball
- 1946–1949: Johns Hopkins

Lacrosse
- 1936-1946: St. Paul's School
- 1947–1949: Johns Hopkins
- 1950–1975: Hofstra
- 1976–1978: Hampden–Sydney

Administrative career (AD unless noted)
- 1951–1975: Hofstra

Head coaching record
- Overall: 167–112–5 (college football); 22–35 (college basketball); 261–159–4 (college lacrosse)

Accomplishments and honors

Championships
- Football; 1 Mason–Dixon (1948)

Howard "Howdy" Myers Jr. (August 23, 1910 – February 12, 1980) was an American football, basketball and lacrosse coach and college athletics administrator. He served as head football coach for Johns Hopkins University from 1946 to 1949 and again in 1979 and at Hofstra University from 1950 to 1974, compiling a career college football record of 167–112–5. Myers was also the head lacrosse coach at Johns Hopkins from 1946 to 1949, at Hofstra from 1950 to 1975, and at Hampden–Sydney College from 1976 to 1978, amassing a career college lacrosse record of 261–159–4. In addition, he was the head basketball coach at Johns Hopkins from 1946 to 1949, tallying a mark of 22–35. Myers coached lacrosse at St. Paul's School in Brooklandville, Maryland where he coached that team to four straight undefeated seasons, with a record of 61 wins and no losses. In 1971, Myers was inducted into the National Lacrosse Hall of Fame.

Myers died of heart failure on February 12, 1980, at Johns Hopkins Hospital in Baltimore, after having undergone cancer surgery a week earlier.

== Head coaching record ==
=== College football ===
Year	Team	Overall	Conference	Standing	Bowl/playoffs
Johns Hopkins Blue Jays (Mason–Dixon Conference) (1946–1949)
1946	Johns Hopkins	5–3	2–0	2nd	
1947	Johns Hopkins	5–2–1	2–1–1	3rd	
1948	Johns Hopkins	7–1	3–0	1st	
1949	Johns Hopkins	4–4	2–1	T–2nd	
Hofstra Flying Dutchmen (Independent) (1950–1959)
1950	Hofstra	2–6			
1951	Hofstra	6–2–1			
1952	Hofstra	8–1			
1953	Hofstra	6–3			
1954	Hofstra	7–2			
1955	Hofstra	3–6			
1956	Hofstra	7–3			
1957	Hofstra	9–1			
1958	Hofstra	6–4			
1959	Hofstra	9–0			
Hofstra Flying Dutchmen (Middle Atlantic Conference) (1960–1969)
1960	Hofstra	7–1–1	2–0	N/A (Northern College)	
1961	Hofstra	7–2	2–0	N/A (Northern College)	
1962	Hofstra	8–2	1–0	N/A (Northern College)	L Cement Bowl
1963	Hofstra	3–6	0–0	N/A (Northern College)	
1964	Hofstra	6–3–1	0–3–1	T–6th (University)	
1965	Hofstra	8–2	4–1	2nd (University)	
1966	Hofstra	2–8	1–3	6th (University)	
1967	Hofstra	8–2	3–1	2nd (University)	
1968	Hofstra	5–5	1–3	6th (University)	
1969	Hofstra	0–10	0–5	7th (University)	
Hofstra Flying Dutchmen (NCAA College Division independent) (1970–1971)
1970	Hofstra	5–5			
1971	Hofstra	5–6			
Hofstra Flying Dutchmen (Metropolitan Intercollegiate Conference) (1972–1975)
1972	Hofstra	5–6	1–2	3rd	
1973	Hofstra	8–3	4–1	2nd	
1974	Hofstra	1–9–1	0–4–1	6th	
Hofstra:		141–98–4	19–24–2		
Johns Hopkins Blue Jays (Middle Atlantic Conference) (1979)
1979	Johns Hopkins	5–4	4–4 (Southern)	T–6th	
Johns Hopkins:		26–14–1	13–6–1		
Total:		167–112–5			
National championship Conference title Conference division title or championship game berth

== Honors ==
Hofstra University honored Howdy Myers by placing a bust outside its main athletic complex.

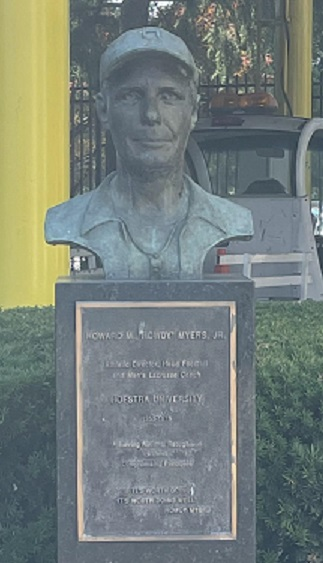
Head bust of Howdy Meyers on Hofstra University campus which stands outside the main athletic complex.

== See also ==
- List of college men's lacrosse coaches with 250 wins
- List of college football head coaches with non-consecutive tenure
