= Bill Leete =

Biographical details
- Born: 1944 or 1945 (age 80–81); Williamstown, Massachusetts, U.S.

Playing career

Football
- 1965–1966: Vermont

Baseball
- 1966–1967: Vermont
- Positions: Defensive back, quarterback (football); Third baseman (baseball)

Coaching career (HC unless noted)

Football
- 1967–1968: Vermont (assistant)
- 1969–1974: Hofstra (DC)
- 1975–1980: Hofstra

Baseball
- 1970–1978: Hofstra

Administrative career (AD unless noted)
- 1975–1981: Hofstra (assistant AD)
- 1981–?: New Haven
- 1984–1990: NECC (commissioner)

Head coaching record
- Overall: 30–23–1 (football); 79–136–1 (baseball)

William M. Leete Jr. (born c. 1944) is an American former football and baseball player, coach, and college athletics administrator. He was the head coach of Hofstra University's football team from 1975 to 1980. He compiled a 30–23–1 overall record. After leaving Hofstra, Leete went on to become the athletic director at the University of New Haven.

== Head coaching record ==
=== Football ===
Year	Team	Overall	Conference	Standing	Bowl/playoffs
Hofstra Flying Dutchmen (Metropolitan Intercollegiate Conference) (1975–1977)
1975	Hofstra	3–6	1–4	5th	
1976	Hofstra	4–4	2–3	3rd	
1977	Hofstra	6–3	3–2	3rd	
Hofstra Flying Dutchmen (NCAA Division III independent) (1978–1990)
1978	Hofstra	4–5			
1979	Hofstra	5–3–1			
1980	Hofstra	8–2			
Hofstra:		30–23–1	6–9		
Total:		30–23–1			
