= 1959 Hofstra Flying Dutchmen football team =

American college football season

1959 Hofstra Flying Dutchmen football
- Conference: Independent
- Record: 9–0
- Head coach: Howdy Myers (10th season)
- Captains: George Dempster; Chet O'Neill
- Home stadium: Hofstra Field

1959 Eastern non-major college football independents records
| | Conf. | | | Overall |
| Team | W | L | T | W | | L | | T |
|---|---|---|---|---|---|---|---|---|
| Hofstra | | – | | 9 | – | 0 | – | 0 |
| Buffalo | | – | | 8 | – | 1 | – | 0 |
| Carnegie Tech | | – | | 7 | – | 1 | – | 0 |
| No. 8 Southern Connecticut State ^ | | – | | 8 | – | 2 | – | 0 |
| Northeastern | | – | | 1 | – | 6 | – | 1 |
^ – NAIA playoff participant; Rankings from NAIA poll

The 1959 Hofstra Flying Dutchmen football team was an American football team that represented Hofstra College as an independent during the 1959 college football season. In their tenth year under head coach Howdy Myers, the Flying Dutchmen compiled a 9–0 record and outscored opponents by a total of 275 to 44. George Dempster and Chet O'Neill were the team co-captains. It was the first undefeated season in the 25-year history of Hofstra's football program. The team broke the school's single-game scoring record with 65 points against Post.

The team's statistical leaders included Tom MacDonald with 1,168 passing yards, Bill Kolb with 371 rushing yards, and Bob DeNeef with 545 receiving yards and 39 points scored.

The Flying Dutchmen played their home games at Hofstra Field in Hempstead on Long Island, New York.

== Schedule ==
| Date | Opponent | Site | Result | Attendance | Source |
|---|---|---|---|---|---|
| October 2 | at Upsala | East Orange, NJ | W 6–0 | | |
| October 10 | Bridgeport | Hofstra Field; Hempstead, NY | W 47–0 | | |
| October 17 | C.W. Post | Hofstra Field; Hempstead, NY | W 65–14 | | |
| October 24 | at Temple | Temple Stadium; Philadelphia, PA | W 15–0 | 2,500 | |
| October 31 | Muhlenberg^{†} | Hofstra Field; Hempstead, NY | W 18–0 | | |
| November 7 | Gettysburg | Hofstra Field; Hempstead, NY | W 18–6 | | |
| November 14 | at Springfield | Springfield, MA | W 31–6 | | |
| November 21 | at Merchant Marine | Kings Point, NY | W 40–18 | | |
| November 26 | Scranton | Hofstra Field; Hempstead, NY | W 35–0 | 5,500 | |
^{†}Homecoming
