= 1959 Connecticut Huskies football team =

American college football season

1959 Connecticut Huskies football

Yankee Conference champion
- Conference: Yankee Conference
- Record: 6–3 (4–0 Yankee)
- Head coach: Bob Ingalls (8th season)
- Home stadium: Memorial Stadium

1959 Yankee Conference football standings
	Conf.					Overall
Team	W		L		T	W		L		T
Connecticut $	4	–	0	–	0	6	–	3	–	0
UMass	2	–	2	–	0	3	–	5	–	1
Maine	1	–	2	–	2	3	–	3	–	2
New Hampshire	1	–	2	–	1	3	–	3	–	2
Rhode Island	1	–	2	–	1	3	–	5	–	1
Vermont	0	–	1	–	0	4	–	3	–	0
$ – Conference champion

The 1959 Connecticut Huskies football team represented the University of Connecticut in the 1959 college football season. The Huskies were led by eighth-year head coach Bob Ingalls, and completed the season with a record of 6–3.

== Schedule ==
Date	Opponent	Rank	Site	Result	Attendance	Source
September 19	Springfield*		Memorial Stadium; Storrs, CT	W 35–8	8,208	
September 26	at Yale*	No. 5	Yale Bowl; New Haven, CT	L 0–20	30,268	
October 3	at Rutgers*	No. 13	Rutgers Stadium; Piscataway, NJ	L 8–20	7,500	
October 10	UMass		Memorial Stadium; Storrs, CT (rivalry)	W 26–0	9,147	
October 17	at Maine		Alumni Field; Orono, ME	W 18–15	5,800	
October 23	at Boston University*		Boston University Field; Boston, MA	L 7–8	10,000	
October 31	New Hampshire		Memorial Stadium; Storrs, CT	W 39–38	6,049–6,200	
November 7	at Northeastern*		Parsons Field; Brookline, MA	W 30–2	2,500	
November 14	Rhode Island		Memorial Stadium; Storrs, CT (rivalry)	W 34–0	10,300–10,352	
*Non-conference game; Rankings from Coaches' Poll released prior to the game
