= 1959 Northern Illinois Huskies football team =

American college football season

1959 Northern Illinois Huskies football
- Conference: Interstate Intercollegiate Athletic Conference
- Record: 7–2 (4–2 IIAC)
- Head coach: Howard Fletcher (4th season)
- MVP: Lew Flinn
- Captains: Wayne Dannehl; Dale Berman
- Home stadium: Glidden Field

1959 Interstate Intercollegiate Athletic Conference football standings
	Conf.					Overall
Team	W		L		T	W		L		T
No. 2 Western Illinois $	6	–	0	–	0	9	–	0	–	0
No. 17 Northern Illinois State	4	–	2	–	0	7	–	2	–	0
Central Michigan	4	–	2	–	0	7	–	3	–	0
Southern Illinois	4	–	2	–	0	5	–	4	–	0
Eastern Illinois	1	–	4	–	1	3	–	5	–	1
Eastern Michigan	1	–	5	–	0	1	–	7	–	0
Illinois State Normal	0	–	5	–	1	3	–	5	–	1
$ – Conference champion; Rankings from NAIA poll

The 1959 Northern Illinois Huskies football team represented Northern Illinois University as a member of the Interstate Intercollegiate Athletic Conference (IIAC) during the 1959 college football season. Led by fourth-year head coach Howard Fletcher, the Huskies compiled an overall record of 7–2 with a mark of 4–2 in conference play, tying for second place in the IIAC. The team played home games at the 5,500-seat Glidden Field, located on the east end of campus, in DeKalb, Illinois.

== Schedule ==
Date	Opponent	Site	Result	Attendance	Source
September 19	Wheaton (IL)*	Glidden Field; DeKalb, IL	W 35–8		
September 26	at North Central*	Naperville, IL	W 27–6		
October 3	at Southern Illinois	McAndrew Stadium; Carbondale, IL	W 20–15	7,000	
October 10	at Eastern Illinois	Lincoln Field; Charleston, IL	W 38–6		
October 17	Western Illinois	Glidden Field; DeKalb, IL	L 13–18		
October 24	at Central Michigan	Alumni Field; Mount Pleasant, MI	L 7–29	9,000	
October 31	Illinois State	Glidden Field; DeKalb, IL	W 40–14		
November 7	Eastern Michigan	Glidden Field; DeKalb, IL	W 34–0		
November 14	at Hillsdale*	Hillsdale, MI	W 33–27		
*Non-conference game
