= 1959 Buffalo Bulls football team =

American college football season

1959 Buffalo Bulls football
- Conference: Independent
- Record: 8–1
- Head coach: Dick Offenhamer (5th season)
- Captains: Sam Sanders; Stan Kowalski
- Home stadium: Rotary Field

1959 Eastern non-major college football independents records
	Conf.			Overall
Team	W	L	T	W		L		T
Hofstra		–		9	–	0	–	0
Buffalo		–		8	–	1	–	0
Carnegie Tech		–		7	–	1	–	0
No. 8 Southern Connecticut State ^		–		8	–	2	–	0
Northeastern		–		1	–	6	–	1
^ – NAIA playoff participant; Rankings from NAIA poll

The 1959 Buffalo Bulls football team represented the University at Buffalo as an independent during the 1959 college football season. Led by fifth-year head coach Dick Offenhamer, the Bulls compiled a record of 8–1 and outscored opponents 279 points to 93.

== Schedule ==
Date	Opponent	Rank	Site	Result	Attendance	Source
September 26	at Temple	No. T–20	Temple Stadium; Philadelphia, PA	W 28–14	4,000	
October 3	Cortland	No. 8	Rotary Field; Buffalo, NY	W 68–2	8,500	
October 10	at Bucknell	No. 5	Memorial Stadium; Lewisburg, PA	L 21–26	5,000	
October 17	at Baldwin–Wallace	No. 10	Berea, OH	W 27–18	4,000	
October 24	Western Reserve	No. 9	Rotary Field; Buffalo, NY	W 22–2	6,000	
October 31	at Youngstown	No. 8	Youngstown, OH	W 16–7	4,500	
November 7	Rhode Island	No. 9	Rotary Field; Buffalo, NY	W 41–6	8,500–9,000	
November 14	Gettysburg	No. 10	Rotary Field; Buffalo, NY	W 19–6	3,000	
November 21	Marshall	No. T–11	Rotary Field; Buffalo, NY	W 37–12	7,500	
Rankings from UPI Poll released prior to the game
