= 1959 small college football rankings =

- Selector: UPI
- No. 1: Bowling Green
- Small college football rankings (AP, UPI)
- «1958 1960»

The 1959 small college football rankings are rankings of college football teams representing smaller college and university teams during the 1959 college football season and the 1959 NAIA football season. The rankings were prepared and published by United Press International (UPI). The Associated Press (AP) did not begin publishing small-college rankings until 1960.

The UPI's small-college rankings for 1959 were based on voting by the UPI's board of coaches. The undefeated 1959 Bowling Green Falcons football team outscored opponents 274 to 83 and was ranked first by wide margin with 24 first-place votes and 407 total points.

The 1959 Mississippi Southern Southerners football team (6–4), with losses to University Division Texas A&M and Auburn, were ranked second. Mississippi Southern had been named the small-college national champion in 1958. The UPI ranked 1959 Middle Tennessee Blue Raiders football team at No. 3. The Blue Raiders also compiled an undefeated record (10–0–1) and went on to win the 1960 Tangerine Bowl. The 1959 Delaware Fightin' Blue Hens football team (8–1), led by College Football Hall of Fame coach David M. Nelson, lost to Bowling Green and was ranked at No. 4. A third undefeated team, the 1959 Western Illinois Leathernecks football team (9–0), was ranked sixth.

== Legend ==
	Increase in ranking
	Decrease in ranking
	Not ranked previous week
(#–#)	Win–loss record
(Italics)	Number of first place votes
т	Tied with team above or below also with this symbol

== UPI coaches poll ==
	Week 1 Sept 24	Week 2 Oct 1	Week 3 Oct 8	Week 4 Oct 15	Week 5 Oct 22	Week 6 Oct 29	Week 7 Nov 5	Week 8 Nov 12	Week 9 Nov 19	Week 10 Nov 26	
1.	Mississippi Southern (11)	Mississippi Southern (1–0) (27)	Mississippi Southern (1–1) (22)	Mississippi Southern (2–1) (32)	Mississippi Southern (3–1) (32)	Mississippi Southern (4–1) (32)	Delaware (6–0) (18)	Delaware (7–0) (23)	Bowling Green (8–0) (20)	Bowling Green (9–0) (23)	1.
2.	West Chester (7)	Miami (OH) (1–0) (4)	Miami (OH) (2–0) (9)	West Chester (3–0) (2)	Delaware (4–0) (1)	Delaware (5–0) (2)	Mississippi Southern (4–2) (13)	Mississippi Southern (5–2) (7)	Mississippi Southern (6–2) (5)	Mississippi Southern (6–3) (5)	2.
3.	Chattanooga (2) т	West Chester (2–0) (5)	East Texas State (3–0) (3)	Delaware (3–0) (2)	West Chester (4–0) (2)	Miami (OH) (4–1) (1)	West Chester (6–0) (2)	Bowling Green (7–0) (4)	Middle Tennessee (9–0) (3)	Middle Tennessee (9–0) (2)	3.
4.	East Texas State (2) т	East Texas State (2–0) (1)	West Chester (2–0) (2)	Montana State (3–1) (1)	Miami (OH) (3–1)	West Chester (5–0)	Bowling Green (6–0) (4)	Middle Tennessee (8–0) (2)	Delaware (7–1) (4)	Delaware (8–1) (1)	4.
5.	Connecticut (1)	Xavier (3–0)	Buffalo (2–0) (1)	Miami (OH) (2–1)	Middle Tennessee (5–0) (2)	Middle Tennessee (6–0) (1)	Middle Tennessee (7–0) (3)	East Texas State (7–1)	East Texas State (8–1)	East Texas State (9–1)	5.
6.	Miami (OH) (1)	Montana State (2–0) (1)	Chattanooga (2–1)	Middle Tennessee (4–0)	Ohio (4–0)	Bowling Green (5–0) (3)	East Texas State (6–1)	West Chester (6–1)	Western Illinois (9–0) (1)	Western Illinois (9–0)	6.
7.	Xavier (3)	Chattanooga (1–1)	Montana State (2–1) (1)	East Texas State (3–1) (1)	East Texas State (4–1)	East Texas State (5–1)	Miami (OH) (4–2) (1)	Memphis State (5–2) (1)	West Chester (7–1)	Memphis State (5–4)	7.
8.	Arizona State–Flagstaff (2)	Buffalo (1–0)	Middle Tennessee (3–0) (1)	Ohio (3–0) (3)	Bowling Green (4–0)	Buffalo (4–1)	Memphis State (5–2) (2)	Miami (OH) (5–2)	Memphis State (5–3)	Louisiana Tech (8–1) (2)	8.
9.	Northeastern State (1)	Northeastern State (2–1)	Delaware (2–0)	Chattanooga (2–2)	Buffalo (3–1)	Lamar Tech (7–0) (1)	Buffalo (4–1)	Western Illinois (8–0)	Ohio (7–1)	Ohio (7–2)	9.
10.	Middle Tennessee	Arizona State–Flagstaff (1–2)	Xavier (3–1)	Buffalo (2–1)	Montana State (3–2)	Ohio (4–1)	Western Illinois (7–0)	Buffalo (5–1)	Louisiana Tech (6–1)	West Chester (7–1)	10.
11.	Hillsdale	Memphis State	Ohio	Bowling Green (1)	Lamar Tech т	Western Illinois	Ohio	Hillsdale	Buffalo т	Lenoir–Rhyne (1)	11.
12.	Cal Poly	Middle Tennessee	Arizona State–Flagstaff	Lamar Tech	Bucknell т	Montana State	Lamar Tech	Ohio	Lenoir–Rhyne т	Buffalo	12.
13.	Montana State (1)	Connecticut	Northeastern State	Arizona State–Flagstaff	Hillsdale	Louisiana Tech	Hillsdale	Lenoir–Rhyne	Butler	Butler	13.
14.	Memphis State (1)	Bowling Green (1)	Lamar Tech	Memphis State т	Memphis State	Hillsdale	Lenoir–Rhyne	Louisiana Tech т	Hillsdale	Florida A&M	14.
15.	Gustavus Adolphus	Hillsdale	McMurry	Hillsdale т	Chattanooga т	Memphis State	Montana State	Montana State т	Miami (OH)	Hillsdale	15.
16.	Northern Illinois	Delaware т	Hillsdale	Northeastern State	Kent State т	Lenoir–Rhyne	Arizona State–Flagstaff	Lamar Tech	Presbyterian	Idaho State	16.
17.	Lamar Tech	Butler т	Bowling Green	Butler	Western Illinois	Presbyterian т	Butler	Butler	Northern Illinois т	San Francisco State	17.
18.	Butler	Lamar Tech	Western Illinois т	Kent State	Lenoir–Rhyne т	Arizona State–Flagstaff т	Chattanooga	Idaho State т	Tennessee State т	Presbyterian	18.
19.	Toledo	McMurry	Louisiana Tech т	Texas A&I т	Arizona State–Flagstaff т	Chattanooga	Presbyterian	William Jewell т	Idaho State	Miami (OH)	19.
20.	Pittsburg State т	Fresno State	Butler	Xavier т	Louisiana Tech	Tennessee State A&I	Louisiana Tech	Florida A&M	Montana State	McMurry т	20.
21.	Buffalo т			Louisiana Tech т						Hofstra т	21.
22.	Central Michigan т										22.
23.	UMass т										23.
	Week 1 Sept 24	Week 2 Oct 1	Week 3 Oct 8	Week 4 Oct 15	Week 5 Oct 22	Week 6 Oct 29	Week 7 Nov 5	Week 8 Nov 12	Week 9 Nov 19	Week 10 Nov 26	
		Dropped: 12 Cal Poly; 15 Gustavus Adolphus; 16 Northern Illinois; 19 Toledo; 20 Pittsburg State; 20 Central Michigan; 20 UMass	Dropped: 11 Memphis State; 13 Connecticut; 20 Fresno State	Dropped: 15 McMurry; 18 Western Illinois	Dropped: 16 Northeastern State; 17 Butler; 19 Texas A&I; 20 Xavier	Dropped: 12 Bucknell; 16 Kent State	Dropped: 20 Tennessee State A&I	Dropped: 16 Arizona State–Flagstaff; 18 Chattanooga; 19 Presbyterian	Dropped: 16 Lamar Tech; 19 William Jewell; 20 Florida A&M	Dropped: 17 Northern Illinois; 18 Tennessee State; 20 Montana State	

== Associated Negro Press rankings ==
The Associated Negro Press ranked the top 1959 teams from historically black colleges and universities in an era when college football was often racially segregated.

The rankings were published on December 18:

- 1. Florida A&M (10–0)
- 2. Tennessee A&I (9–1)
- 3. Southern (8–2)
- 4. Prairie View A&M (9–2)
- 5. North Carolina A&T (6–2)
- 6. Morris Brown (6–3)
- 7. Texas Southern (7–3)
- 8. Jackson State (6–4)
- 9. Winston-Salem State (6–2)
- 10. Virginia Union (7–0–2)
- 11. Lincoln (MO) (6–2–1)
- 12. Maryland State (6–1–1)
- 13. Clark (6–1–2)
- 14. Bethune-Cookman (5–2)
- 15. Virginia State (7–2)
- 16. North Carolina College (4–4–1)
- 17. St. Augustine's (7–2)
- 18. Norfolk State (7–1–1)
- 19. Grambling (5–5)
- 20. Fort Valley State (5–3–1)
- 21. Kentucky State (3–5–1)
- 22. Central State (4–3–1)
- 23. Morehouse (5–2–1)
- 24. Knoxville (4–2)
- 25. Tuskegee (4–4–1)
