= List of LSU Tigers bowl games =

The LSU Tigers football team represents Louisiana State University in the sport of American football. LSU has competed in 54 bowl games (with 53 being sanctioned by the NCAA) in its history, going 29–24–1 in NCAA sanctioned bowl games. The Tigers have played in at least one bowl game in every season since 2000; their streak of 20 bowl seasons is the fourth-longest active streak in the NCAA and second-longest in the Southeastern Conference.

== Bowl games ==
Season	Date	Coach	Bowl	Opponent	Result
1907	December 25, 1907	Edgar Wingard	Bacardi Bowl (Note: LSU does not count the victory against the University of Havana in 1907 among its bowl games and bowl wins.)	Havana	W 56–0
1935	January 1, 1936	Bernie Moore	Sugar Bowl	TCU	L 2–3
1936	January 1, 1937	Bernie Moore	Sugar Bowl	Santa Clara	L 14–21
1937	January 1, 1938	Bernie Moore	Sugar Bowl	Santa Clara	L 0–6
1943	January 1, 1944	Bernie Moore	Orange Bowl	Texas A&M	W 19–14
1946	January 1, 1947	Bernie Moore	Cotton Bowl Classic	Arkansas	T 0–0
1949	January 2, 1950	Gaynell Tinsley	Sugar Bowl	Oklahoma	L 0–35
1958	January 1, 1959	Paul Dietzel	Sugar Bowl	Clemson	W 7–0
1959	January 1, 1960	Paul Dietzel	Sugar Bowl	Ole Miss	L 0–21
1961	January 1, 1962	Paul Dietzel	Orange Bowl	Colorado	W 25–7
1962	January 1, 1963	Charles McClendon	Cotton Bowl Classic	Texas	W 13–0
1963	December 21, 1963	Charles McClendon	Bluebonnet Bowl	Baylor	L 7–14
1964	January 1, 1965	Charles McClendon	Sugar Bowl	Syracuse	W 13–10
1965	January 1, 1966	Charles McClendon	Cotton Bowl Classic	Arkansas	W 14–7
1967	January 1, 1968	Charles McClendon	Sugar Bowl	Wyoming	W 20–13
1968	December 30, 1968	Charles McClendon	Peach Bowl	Florida State	W 31–27
1970	January 1, 1971	Charles McClendon	Orange Bowl	Nebraska	L 12–17
1971	December 18, 1971	Charles McClendon	Sun Bowl	Iowa State	W 33–15
1972	December 30, 1972	Charles McClendon	Astro-Bluebonnet Bowl	Tennessee	L 17–24
1973	January 1, 1974	Charles McClendon	Orange Bowl	Penn State	L 9–16
1977	December 31, 1977	Charles McClendon	Sun Bowl	Stanford	L 14–24
1978	December 23, 1978	Charles McClendon	Liberty Bowl	Missouri	L 15–20
1979	December 22, 1979	Charles McClendon	Tangerine Bowl	Wake Forest	W 34–10
1982	January 1, 1983	Jerry Stovall	Orange Bowl	Nebraska	L 20–21
1984	January 1, 1985	Bill Arnsparger	Sugar Bowl	Nebraska	L 10–28
1985	December 27, 1985	Bill Arnsparger	Liberty Bowl	Baylor	L 7–21
1986	January 1, 1987	Bill Arnsparger	Sugar Bowl	Nebraska	L 15–30
1987	December 31, 1987	Mike Archer	Gator Bowl	South Carolina	W 30–13
1988	January 2, 1989	Mike Archer	Hall of Fame Bowl	Syracuse	L 10–23
1995	December 29, 1995	Gerry DiNardo	Independence Bowl	Michigan State	W 45–26
1996	December 28, 1996	Gerry DiNardo	Peach Bowl	Clemson	W 10–7
1997	December 28, 1997	Gerry DiNardo	Independence Bowl	Notre Dame	W 27–9
2000	December 29, 2000	Nick Saban	Peach Bowl	Georgia Tech	W 28–14
2001	January 2, 2002	Nick Saban	Sugar Bowl	Illinois	W 47–34
2002	January 1, 2003	Nick Saban	Cotton Bowl Classic	Texas	L 20–35
2003	January 4, 2004	Nick Saban	Sugar Bowl (BCS National Championship)	Oklahoma	W 21–14
2004	January 1, 2005	Nick Saban	Capital One Bowl	Iowa	L 25–30
2005	December 30, 2005	Les Miles	Peach Bowl	Miami (FL)	W 40–3
2006	January 3, 2007	Les Miles	Sugar Bowl	Notre Dame	W 41–14
2007	January 7, 2008	Les Miles	BCS National Championship Game	Ohio State	W 38–24
2008	December 31, 2008	Les Miles	Chick-Fil-A Bowl	Georgia Tech	W 38–3
2009	January 1, 2010	Les Miles	Capital One Bowl	Penn State	L 17–19
2010	January 7, 2011	Les Miles	Cotton Bowl Classic	Texas A&M	W 41–24
2011	January 9, 2012	Les Miles	BCS National Championship Game	Alabama	L 0–21
2012	December 31, 2012	Les Miles	Chick-Fil-A Bowl	Clemson	L 24–25
2013	January 1, 2014	Les Miles	Outback Bowl	Iowa	W* 21–14
2014	December 30, 2014	Les Miles	Music City Bowl	Notre Dame	L 28–31
2015	December 29, 2015	Les Miles	Texas Bowl	Texas Tech	W* 56–27
2016	December 31, 2016	Ed Orgeron	Citrus Bowl	Louisville	W 29–9
2017	January 1, 2018	Ed Orgeron	Citrus Bowl	Notre Dame	L 17–21
2018	January 1, 2019	Ed Orgeron	Fiesta Bowl	UCF	W 40–32
2019	December 28, 2019	Ed Orgeron	Peach Bowl – CFP Semifinal	Oklahoma	W 63–28
2019	January 13, 2020	Ed Orgeron	CFP National Championship	Clemson	W 42–25
2021	January 4, 2022	Brad Davis	Texas Bowl	Kansas State	L 20–42
2022	January 2, 2023	Brian Kelly	Citrus Bowl	Purdue	W 63–7
2023	January 1, 2024	Brian Kelly	ReliaQuest Bowl	Wisconsin	W 35–31
2024	December 31, 2024	Brian Kelly	Texas Bowl	Baylor	W 44–31

== Notes ==
* The NCAA vacated all of LSU's wins from 2012–2015 after its use of a player eventually ruled ineligible.
