= Bobby Franklin (American football) =

American football player and coach (1936–2025)

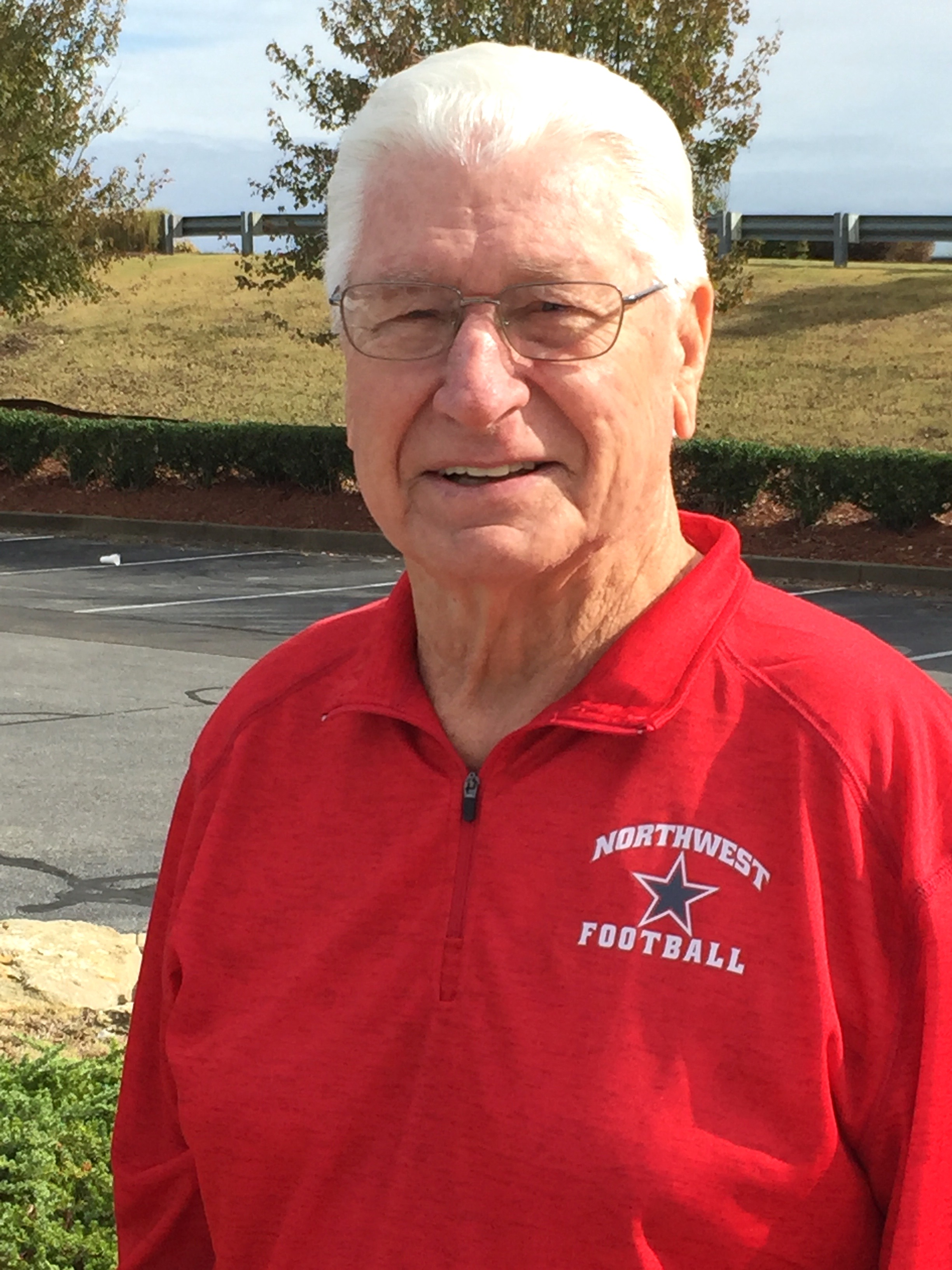
- Franklin in 2019

No. 24, 22
- Position: Safety

Personal information
- Born: October 5, 1936; Clarksdale, Mississippi, U.S.
- Died: May 13, 2025 (aged 88); Senatobia, Mississippi, U.S.
- Listed height: 5 ft 11 in (1.80 m)
- Listed weight: 182 lb (83 kg)

Career information
- High school: Clarksdale
- College: Ole Miss
- NFL draft: 1960: 11th round, 127th overall pick
- AFL draft: 1960

Career history

Playing
- Cleveland Browns (1960–1966)

Coaching
- Georgia Tech (1967) Assistant coach; Dallas Cowboys (1968–1971) Defensive backfield coach; Dallas Cowboys (1972) Special teams coach; Baltimore Colts (1973) Defensive backfield coach; Northwest Mississippi CC (1979–1980) Offensive coordinator; Northwest Mississippi CC (1981–2004) Head coach

Operations
- Seattle Seahawks (1980–1985) Scout

Awards and highlights
- NFL champion (1964); Second-team All-SEC (1958)

Career NFL statistics
- Interceptions: 13
- Touchdowns: 3
- Stats at Pro Football Reference

Bobby Ray Franklin (October 5, 1936 – May 13, 2025) was an American football player and coach. He played professionally as a defensive back for the Cleveland Browns of the National Football League (NFL).

Franklin played college football as a quarterback for the Ole Miss Rebels before playing in the NFL as a safety for Cleveland. He served as the head football coach at Northwest Mississippi Community College from 1981 to 2004, leading his teams to NJCAA National Football Championships in 1982 and 1992. He has been named to seven halls of fame for his athletic and coaching accomplishments.

After retiring as a player, he coached at Georgia Tech and then became the defensive backs coach and the special teams coach for the Dallas Cowboys from 1968 to 1972. He later coached for the Baltimore Colts and scouted for the Seattle Seahawks.

== Early life ==
Franklin was a four-sport letterman at Clarksdale High School in Clarksdale, Mississippi. He was also named All-State, All-Southern Team and All America.

Franklin was recruited by both Mississippi State University and the University of Mississippi. After initially committing to play at Mississippi State, he ultimately chose Ole Miss and was provided a full scholarship, attending the school from 1956 through 1960. He starred at quarterback for the Rebels, and led the team to three consecutive bowl game appearances. He was chosen MVP in the 1958 Gator Bowl in which his team defeated the Florida Gators 7-3. He was also named the MVP in the 1960 Sugar Bowl, throwing two touchdown passes in a 21-0 victory as the second-ranked Rebels defeated defending national champion and third-ranked LSU. Franklin had been injured earlier in the season and had been replaced in the lineup by Jake Gibbs. LSU had defeated the Rebels in an October 31 regular season game 7-3 with the only touchdown scored on Billy Cannon's famous "Halloween Run" punt return.

While Gibbs passed for one touchdown in the Sugar Bowl game, Franklin led the attack, completing 10 of 15 passes for 146 yards. The team was named NCAA national champions by various selection committees.

== Professional playing career ==
=== Cleveland Browns ===
Franklin was an 11th round selection by the Cleveland Browns in the 1960 NFL draft, and was also selected by the Los Angeles Chargers of the newly-formed American Football League (AFL). The Browns also selected Ole Miss teammates Johnny Brewer in the fourth round and offensive lineman/placekicker Robert Khayat in the sixth round. Brewer played for the Browns until 1967 as a tight end and linebacker. Khayat never played for the Browns as he was packaged with offensive tackle Fran O'Brien in a 1960 trade with the Washington Redskins for running back and placekicker Sam Baker. Khayat played for Washington through 1963, primarily as a placekicker. He achieved greater fame by returning to the University of Mississippi in 1995 as its 15th Chancellor.

In joining the Browns, Franklin was reunited with former Ole Miss teammate, guard Gene Hickerson, drafted by the Browns in 1957. The two became lifelong friends and Franklin delivered the presenting speech on behalf of Hickerson when the latter was named to the Pro Football Hall of Fame in 2007. Hickerson, suffering from dementia, was unable to make his own acceptance speech.

The Browns utilized Franklin in the defensive backfield, where he played right safety. Prior to joining the team as rookie, he played in the 1960 College All-Star Game. Franklin led the Browns with eight interceptions in 1960, finishing fourth in the league. Three of those came in a single game, and two were returned for touchdowns of 31 and 37 yards in a 42-0 victory over the Chicago Bears on December 11, a day in which the Browns intercepted seven passes in handing the Bears their worst defeat ever. The two touchdown returns stood as a single game team record until David Bowens repeated the feat in 2010.

In 1961, the Browns employed Franklin as a kickoff specialist in addition to his defensive duties.

Franklin, who also served as the holder for field goals and extra points at Ole Miss, performed the same duties throughout his years with Cleveland, teaming with kickers Baker (1960) and Hall of Famer Lou Groza (1961-1966). In his rookie season, he scored the game's first touchdown with a 19-yard run on a fake field goal in the Browns' final exhibition game, a 14-10 home victory over the Detroit Lions. He repeated the feat in a 1961 league game against the St. Louis Cardinals, going 12 yards to score in a 21-0 victory.

He was a member of the Browns that won the 1964 NFL Championship Game over the Baltimore Colts, pairing with Groza for three extra points and two field goals in the game. Franklin, who served as Cleveland's backup punter throughout his career with the team, punted four times for the Browns in 1965 and appeared in that season's championship game against the Green Bay Packers, which the Browns lost, 23-12.

Exposed by the Browns in the 1966 NFL expansion draft to stock the new Atlanta Falcons franchise, Franklin was selected along with teammates Larry Benz and Dale Memmelaar. Released by Atlanta prior to the start of the regular season, Franklin joined Georgia Tech as a freshman coach. He rejoined the Browns in late September. He remained with the team through the rest of the season after which he announced his retirement to rejoin the coaching staff at Georgia Tech.

== Coaching career ==
=== NFL ===
In 1968, Franklin joined the Dallas Cowboys coaching staff under Tom Landry, serving as defensive backfield coach for four seasons, from 1968 to 1971, and as special teams coach in 1972. He coached in Super Bowl V and Super Bowl VI, earning his second NFL Championship ring in the second game.

Franklin served as the defensive backfield coach of the Baltimore Colts for the 1973 season and scouted for the Seattle Seahawks from 1980 to 1985.

=== Northwest Mississippi ===
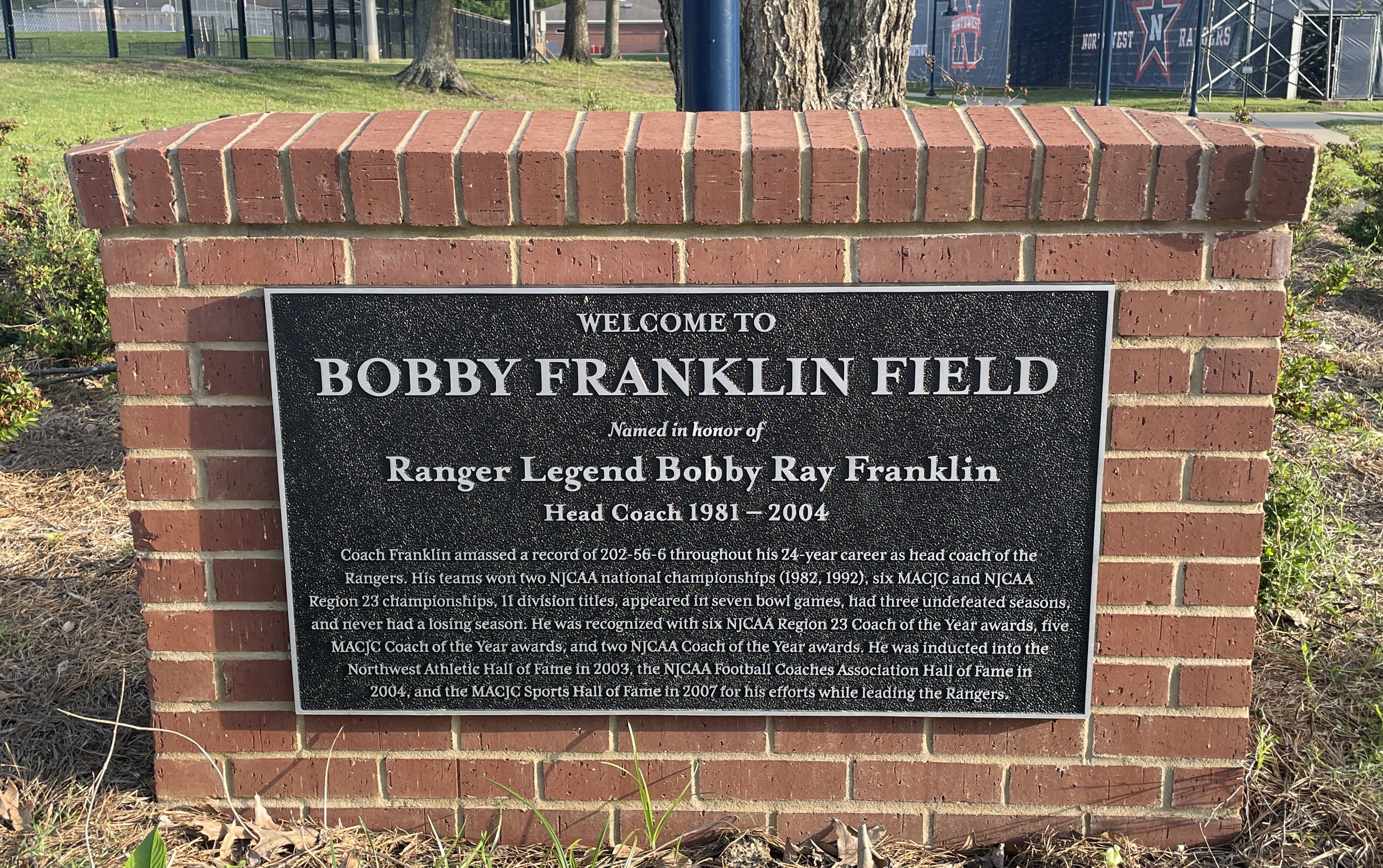
Bobby Franklin Field Plaque at Northwest Mississippi Community College, Senatobia, Mississippi

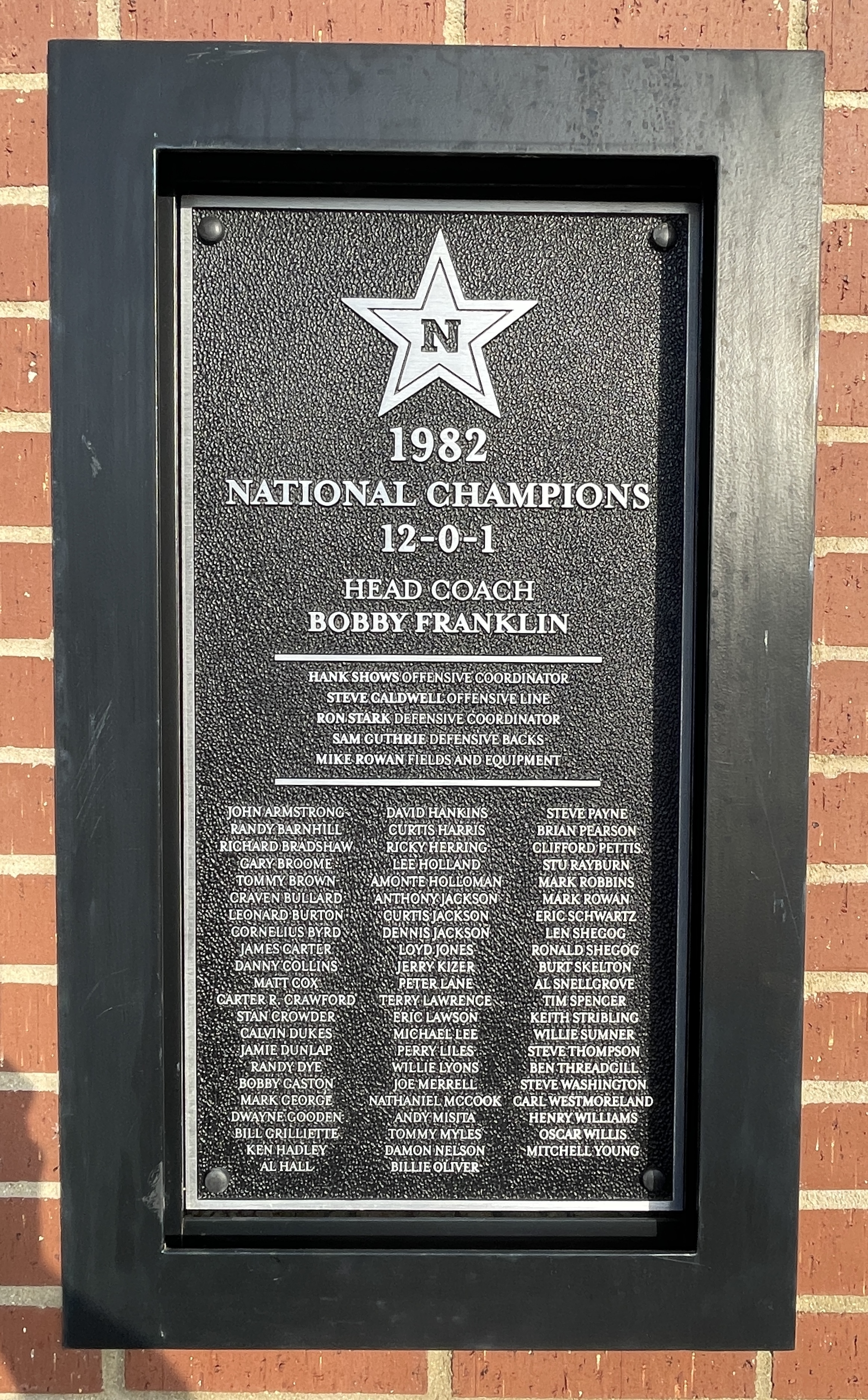
1982 NJCAA National Champions plaque Northwest Mississippi Community College

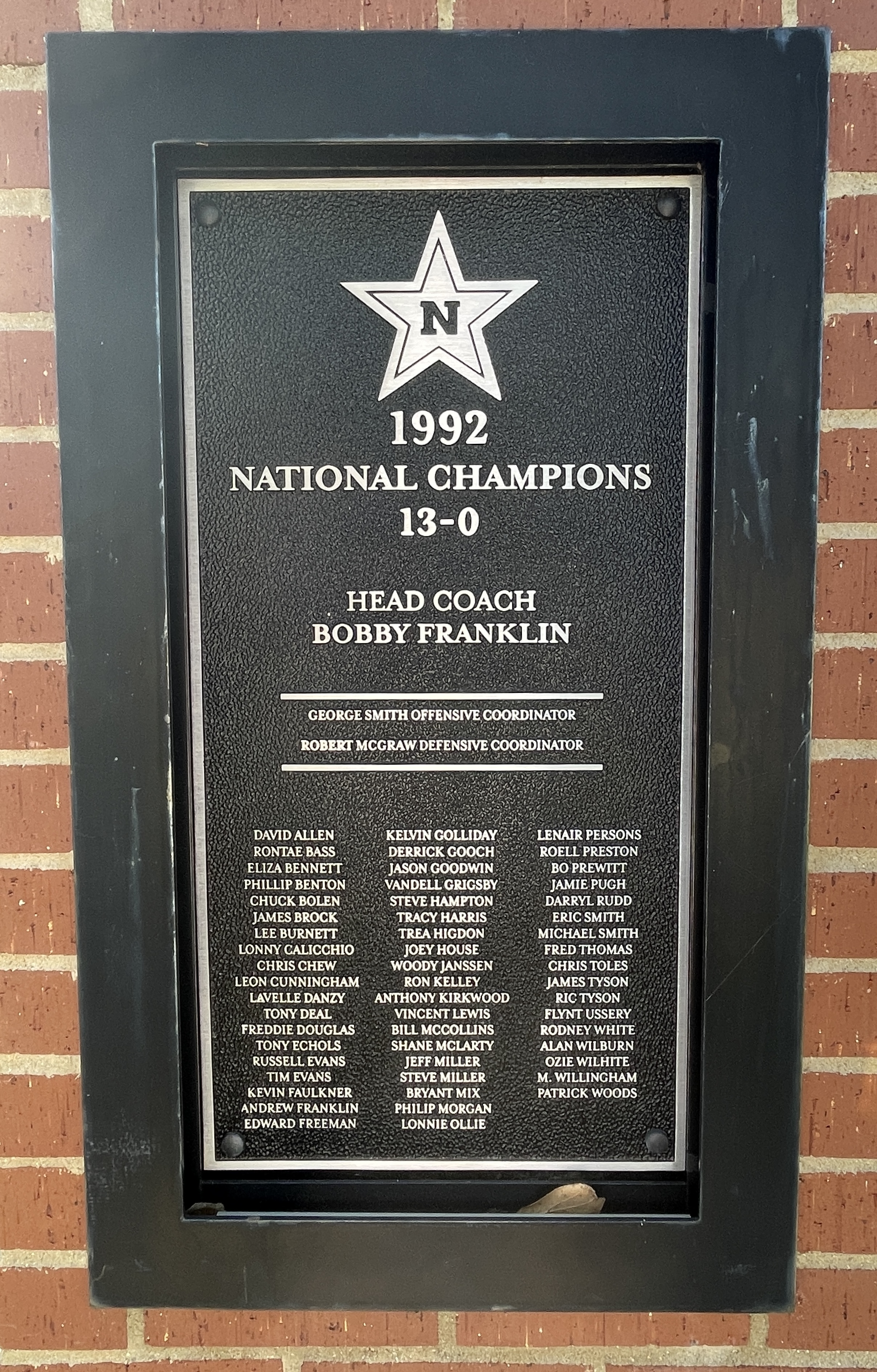
1992 NJCAA National Champions plaque at Northwest Mississippi Community College

Franklin purchased Best Dollar Store in Tunica, Mississippi and operated it as Bobby Franklin's Dollar Store for three years before accepting an offer to join the coaching staff of Northwest Mississippi Community College in 1979. He served as offensive coordinator for two seasons under head coach Ray Poole. He was named head coach in 1981, a post he held for 24 years, leading the Rangers to eight bowl games, finishing with a record of 201–57–6 before retiring after the 2004 season. Under Franklin, the team won the NJCAA National Football Championship in 1982 and 1992 and was runner-up in 1991. As head coach, Franklin helped to develop 35 players who went on to have careers in the NFL or the Canadian Football League (CFL). Franklin was named to the school's Hall of Fame in 2003. The school named its football stadium Bobby Franklin Field in tribute to Franklin in 2005.

== Death ==
Franklin died in Senatobia, Mississippi on May 13, 2025, at the age of 88.

== Honors ==
Franklin has been named to eight halls of fame:

- 1988: Ole Miss M Club HOF
- 2003: Northwest Mississippi Community College HOF
- 2005: Mississippi Sports HOF and Museum
- 2005: National Junior College Athletic Association HOF
- 2007: Mississippi Community College Sports HOF
- 2010: Mississippi Association of Coaches HOF
- 2013: Clarksdale/Coahoma County Sports HOF
- 2025: Allstate Sugar Bowl HOF
