= 1970 Maryland Terrapins football team =

American college football season

1970 Maryland Terrapins football
- Conference: Atlantic Coast Conference
- Record: 2–9 (2–4 ACC)
- Head coach: Roy Lester (2nd season)
- Home stadium: Byrd Stadium

1970 Atlantic Coast Conference football standings
| | Conf. | | | | | Overall |
| Team | W | | L | | T | W | | L | | T |
|---|---|---|---|---|---|---|---|---|---|---|
| Wake Forest $ | 5 | – | 1 | – | 0 | 6 | – | 5 | – | 0 |
| North Carolina | 5 | – | 2 | – | 0 | 8 | – | 4 | – | 0 |
| Duke | 5 | – | 2 | – | 0 | 6 | – | 5 | – | 0 |
| South Carolina | 3 | – | 2 | – | 1 | 4 | – | 6 | – | 1 |
| NC State | 2 | – | 3 | – | 1 | 3 | – | 7 | – | 1 |
| Clemson | 2 | – | 4 | – | 0 | 3 | – | 8 | – | 0 |
| Maryland | 2 | – | 4 | – | 0 | 2 | – | 9 | – | 0 |
| Virginia | 0 | – | 6 | – | 0 | 5 | – | 6 | – | 0 |
$ – Conference champion; Rankings from AP Poll

The 1970 Maryland Terrapins football team represented the University of Maryland in the 1970 NCAA University Division football season. In their second season under head coach Roy Lester, the Terrapins compiled a 2–9 record (2–4 in conference), finished in seventh place in the Atlantic Coast Conference, and were outscored by their opponents 241 to 112. The team's statistical leaders included Jeff Shugars with 836 passing yards, Art Seymore with 945 rushing yards and 309 receiving yards.

== Schedule ==
| Date | Time | Opponent | Site | Result | Attendance | Source |
|---|---|---|---|---|---|---|
| September 12 | 1:30 p.m. | Villanova* | Byrd Stadium; College Park, MD | L 3–21 | 24,500 | |
| September 19 | | at Duke | Wallace Wade Stadium; Durham, NC | L 12–13 | 12,877 | |
| September 26 | | North Carolina | Byrd Stadium; College Park, MD | L 20–53 | 20,806 | |
| October 2 | 8:15 p.m. | at Miami (FL)* | Miami Orange Bowl; Miami, FL | L 11–18 | 30,190 | |
| October 10 | | at Syracuse* | Archbold Stadium; Syracuse, NY | L 7–23 | 19,872 | |
| October 17 | | South Carolina | Byrd Stadium; College Park, MD | W 21–15 | 15,400 | |
| October 24 | | vs. NC State | Foreman Field; Norfolk, VA (Oyster Bowl) | L 0–6 | 18,200 | |
| October 31 | | Clemson | Byrd Stadium; College Park, MD | L 11–24 | 12,500 | |
| November 7 | | Penn State* | Byrd Stadium; College Park, MD (rivalry) | L 0–34 | 23,400 | |
| November 21 | | at Virginia | Scott Stadium; Charlottesville, VA (rivalry) | W 17–14 | 14,000 | |
| November 28 | | West Virginia* | Byrd Stadium; College Park, MD (rivalry) | L 10–20 | 12,821 | |
*Non-conference game; All times are in Eastern time

== Roster ==
1970 Maryland Terrapins football team roster
Players
Coaches
Offense

| Pos. | # | Name | Class |
|---|---|---|---|
| WR | 22 | Larry Marshall | Jr |

Defense

| Pos. | # | Name | Class |
|---|---|---|---|
| DB | 30 | Tony Greene | Sr |
| DE | 71 | Guy Roberts | Jr |

Special teams

| Pos. | # | Name | Class |

Head coach

- Roy Lester

Coordinators/assistant coaches

- Bob Brush
  (Wide receivers coach)

Legend

- (C) Team captain
- (S) Suspended
- (I) Ineligible
- Injured
- Redshirt
