= 1970 Davidson Wildcats football team =

American college football season

1970 Davidson Wildcats football
- Conference: Southern Conference
- Record: 2–8 (2–4 SoCon)
- Head coach: Dave Fagg (1st season)
- Home stadium: Richardson Stadium

1970 Southern Conference football standings
	Conf.					Overall
Team	W		L		T	W		L		T
William & Mary $	3	–	1	–	0	5	–	7	–	0
The Citadel	4	–	2	–	0	5	–	6	–	0
Furman	3	–	2	–	0	8	–	3	–	0
East Carolina	2	–	2	–	0	3	–	8	–	0
Richmond	3	–	3	–	0	4	–	6	–	0
Davidson	2	–	4	–	0	2	–	8	–	0
VMI	1	–	4	–	0	1	–	10	–	0
$ – Conference champion

The 1970 Davidson Wildcats football team represented Davidson College as a member of the Southern Conference (SoCon) during the 1970 NCAA University Division football season. Led by first-year head coach Dave Fagg, the Wildcats compiled an overall record of 2–8 with a mark of 2–4 in conference play, placing sixth in the SoCon.

== Schedule ==
Date	Opponent	Site	Result	Attendance	Source
September 26	at Richmond	City Stadium; Richmond, VA	W 14–5	10,000	
October 3	Trinity (TX)*	Richardson Stadium; Davidson, NC	L 9–20		
October 10	Bucknell*	Richardson Stadium; Davidson, NC	L 20–21	4,000	
October 17	Furman^{†}	Richardson Stadium; Davidson, NC	L 24–31	7,400	
October 24	at Wofford*	Snyder Field; Spartanburg, SC	L 13–35		
October 31	at VMI	Alumni Memorial Field; Lexington, VA	W 55–21	2,400	
November 7	Lafayette*	Richardson Stadium; Davidson, NC	L 34–53	4,500	
November 14	William & Mary	Richardson Stadium; Davidson, NC	L 28–29	1,800	
November 21	at The Citadel	Johnson Hagood Stadium; Charleston, SC	L 9–44	15,250	
November 28	East Carolina	Richardson Stadium; Davidson, NC	L 18–36	2,500	
*Non-conference game; ^{†}Homecoming
