= 1970 Duke Blue Devils football team =

American college football season

1970 Duke Blue Devils football
- Conference: Atlantic Coast Conference
- Record: 6–5 (5–2 ACC)
- Head coach: Tom Harp (5th season)
- Offensive coordinator: Jacque Hetrick (5th season)
- Defensive coordinator: George Hill (5th season)
- MVP: Leo Hart
- Captains: Dick Biddle; Leo Hart
- Home stadium: Wallace Wade Stadium

1970 Atlantic Coast Conference football standings
	Conf.					Overall
Team	W		L		T	W		L		T
Wake Forest $	5	–	1	–	0	6	–	5	–	0
North Carolina	5	–	2	–	0	8	–	4	–	0
Duke	5	–	2	–	0	6	–	5	–	0
South Carolina	3	–	2	–	1	4	–	6	–	1
NC State	2	–	3	–	1	3	–	7	–	1
Clemson	2	–	4	–	0	3	–	8	–	0
Maryland	2	–	4	–	0	2	–	9	–	0
Virginia	0	–	6	–	0	5	–	6	–	0
$ – Conference champion; Rankings from AP Poll

The 1970 Duke Blue Devils football team was an American football team that represented Duke University as a member of the Atlantic Coast Conference (ACC) during the 1970 NCAA University Division football season. In their fifth year under head coach Tom Harp, the Blue Devils compiled an overall record of 6–5, with a conference record of 5–2, and finished tied for second in the ACC.

== Schedule ==
Date	Opponent	Site	Result	Attendance	Source
September 12	vs. Florida*	Gator Bowl Stadium; Jacksonville, FL	L 19–21	53,841	
September 19	Maryland	Wallace Wade Stadium; Durham, NC	W 13–12	12,877	
September 26	Virginia	Wallace Wade Stadium; Durham, NC	W 17–7	24,478	
October 3	at No. 1 Ohio State*	Ohio Stadium; Columbus, OH	L 10–34	86,123	
October 10	at No. 11 West Virginia*	Mountaineer Field; Morgantown, WV	W 21–13	35,000	
October 17	at NC State	Carter Stadium; Raleigh, NC (rivalry)	W 22–6	26,400	
October 24	at Clemson	Memorial Stadium; Clemson, SC	W 21–10	29,581	
October 31	Georgia Tech*^{†}	Wallace Wade Stadium; Durham, NC	L 16–24	32,650	
November 7	Wake Forest	Wallace Wade Stadium; Durham, NC (rivalry)	L 14–28	28,600	
November 14	at South Carolina	Carolina Stadium; Columbia, SC	W 42–38	42,454	
November 21	at North Carolina	Kenan Stadium; Chapel Hill, NC (Victory Bell)	L 34–59	48,600	
*Non-conference game; ^{†}Homecoming; Rankings from AP Poll released prior to the game

== Roster ==
1970 Duke Blue Devils football team roster
Players
Coaches
Offense

Pos.	#	Name	Class
QB	17	Todd Auryansen	So
TE	84	Bill Baker	Jr
FB	49	Nate Baydoun	Sr
WR	20	L. G. Bryant	Sr
TE	80	Randy Chambers	So
WR	94	Tom Chambers	So
WR	41	Wes Chesson	Sr
G	65	John Dull	Sr
WR	14	Brad Evans	Jr
G	60	Bob Fitch	Jr
C	53	Darryl Fox	Sr
OT	69	Guy Guthrie	Sr
QB	10	Leo Hart	Sr
RB	33	John Johnston	Jr
RB	46	Steve Jones	So
OT	66	Tom Kehl	So
C	58	Ken Krueger	Jr
OT	64	Ed Newman	So
TE	88	C. G. Newsome	Jr
TE	95	Dan Phelan	Jr
OT	72	Joe Politon	So
G	57	Fred Rojas	Sr
QB	18	Dennis Satyshur	Jr
WR	11	John Spoganetz	So
RB	45	Bob Zwirko	Jr

Defense

Pos.	#	Name	Class
LB	35	Phil Asack	Sr
DB	36	Dave Atkins	So
LB	64	Dick Biddle	Sr
DT	79	John Blount	So
DB	23	Mike Davies	Jr
DB	42	Dana Eckel	Jr
LB	85	Jerry Griffin	Jr
DB	30	Bill Hanenberg	So
DB	29	Bob Hayes	Jr
DB	13	Ernie Jackson	Jr
DB	22	Bob Lebby	So
DT	86	Ken Marinak	So
DE	89	Bruce Mills	Jr
LB	37	Lanny Murdock	Jr
DE	81	Bob Parrish	So
DB	19	Ollie Phillips	So
LB	31	Mike Peck	So
DT	71	Curt Rawley	Sr
DB	12	Rich Searl	Jr
DT	51	Jim Tomanchek	Jr
DT	76	John Van Norman	So
DT	56	Bob Wenzel	Jr

Special teams

Pos.	#	Name	Class
K	1	David Wright	Jr

Head coach

- Tom Harp

Coordinators/assistant coaches

- John Gutekunst
  (Freshman coach)

Legend

- (C) Team captain
- (S) Suspended
- (I) Ineligible
- Injured
- Redshirt
