= 1970 William & Mary Indians football team =

American college football season

1970 William & Mary Indians football

SoCon champion

Tangerine Bowl, L 12–40 vs. Toledo
- Conference: Southern Conference
- Record: 5–7 (3–1 SoCon)
- Head coach: Lou Holtz (2nd season)
- Defensive coordinator: Bobby Ross (1st season)
- Captains: Joe Pilch; Bob Herb
- Home stadium: Cary Field

1970 Southern Conference football standings
	Conf.					Overall
Team	W		L		T	W		L		T
William & Mary $	3	–	1	–	0	5	–	7	–	0
The Citadel	4	–	2	–	0	5	–	6	–	0
Furman	3	–	2	–	0	8	–	3	–	0
East Carolina	2	–	2	–	0	3	–	8	–	0
Richmond	3	–	3	–	0	4	–	6	–	0
Davidson	2	–	4	–	0	2	–	8	–	0
VMI	1	–	4	–	0	1	–	10	–	0
$ – Conference champion

The 1970 William & Mary Indians football team represented the College of William & Mary as a member of the Southern Conference (SoCon) during the 1970 NCAA University Division football season. Led by Lou Holtz in his second year as head coach, William & Mary finished the season 5–7 overall and 3–1 in conference play, winning the SoCon title. The Indians were invited to the Tangerine Bowl, where they lost to Toledo.

== Schedule ==
Date	Time	Opponent	Site	Result	Attendance	Source
September 12		at No. T–20 West Virginia*	Mountaineer Field; Morgantown, WV	L 7–43	32,000	
September 18	8:06 p.m.	at Miami (FL)*	Miami Orange Bowl; Miami, FL	L 14–36	27,286	
September 26	1:30 p.m.	Cincinnati*	Cary Field; Williamsburg, VA	L 10–17	7,000	
October 3		Ohio Wesleyan*	Cary Field; Williamsburg, VA	W 33–29	5,000	
October 10		The Citadel	Cary Field; Williamsburg, VA	L 7–16	10,000	
October 17		at VMI	Alumni Memorial Field; Lexington, VA (rivalry)	W 24–10	6,500	
October 24		at Virginia*	Scott Stadium; Charlottesville, VA	L 6–33	17,800	
October 31		Virginia Tech*	Cary Field; Williamsburg, VA	L 14–35	11,000	
November 7		Connecticut*	Cary Field; Williamsburg, VA	W 28–15	7,000	
November 14		at Davidson	Richardson Stadium; Davidson, NC	W 29–28	1,800	
November 21		at Richmond	City Stadium; Richmond, VA (rivalry)	W 34–33	12,000	
December 28		vs. No. 15 Toledo*	Tangerine Bowl; Orlando, FL (Tangerine Bowl)	L 12–40	15,664	
*Non-conference game; Rankings from AP Poll released prior to the game; All times are in Eastern time

== NFL draft ==
= Pro Football Hall of Fame	= Canadian Football Hall of Fame	= College Football Hall of Fame

NFL draft selections

#	Year	Round	Pick	Overall	Name	Team	Position
1	1971	15	19	383	Andy Giles	Oakland Raiders	Defensive end
