= Magnolia Bowl =

American college football rivalry

- LSU Tigers Ole Miss Rebels
- First meeting: December 3, 1894; Ole Miss, 26–6
- Latest meeting: September 19, 2026; Ole Miss, 32–24
- Next meeting: TBD, 2027
- Trophy: Magnolia Bowl Trophy (since 2008)

Statistics
- Total meetings: 115
- All-time series: LSU leads, 64–44–4
- Largest victory: LSU, 52–3 (2011)
- Longest win streak: LSU, 8 (1928–1937)
- Current win streak: Ole Miss, 2 (2025–present)

Locations of LSU and Ole Miss

The Magnolia Bowl is the name given to the LSU–Ole Miss football rivalry. It is an American college football rivalry game played annually by the LSU Tigers football team of Louisiana State University (LSU) and the Ole Miss Rebels football team of the University of Mississippi (Ole Miss). The teams compete for the Magnolia Bowl Trophy. The Tigers and the Rebels first met in 1894, and have been regular opponents in Southeastern Conference (SEC), meeting annually, without interruption, since 1945.

The rivalry was at its height during the 1950s and 1960s, when both teams were highly ranked and during which time both teams claimed a national championship. The rivalry died down from the 1970s to the 1990s, owing to Ole Miss not returning to conference or national prominence since the 1970s and because LSU has seen new rivalries emerge when the SEC split into two divisions in 1992, most notably Alabama, Arkansas, Auburn, Florida and Texas A&M. Even though the rivalry has not attracted the same national attention in recent years, it still stirs up passion in both Oxford and Baton Rouge.

In 2008, the student bodies of both schools elected to christen the yearly contest the "Magnolia Bowl", the magnolia flower being the state flower of both Louisiana and Mississippi, and award a trophy to the winner. Ole Miss defeated LSU 31–13 in Baton Rouge, Louisiana to become the first winner of the new trophy.

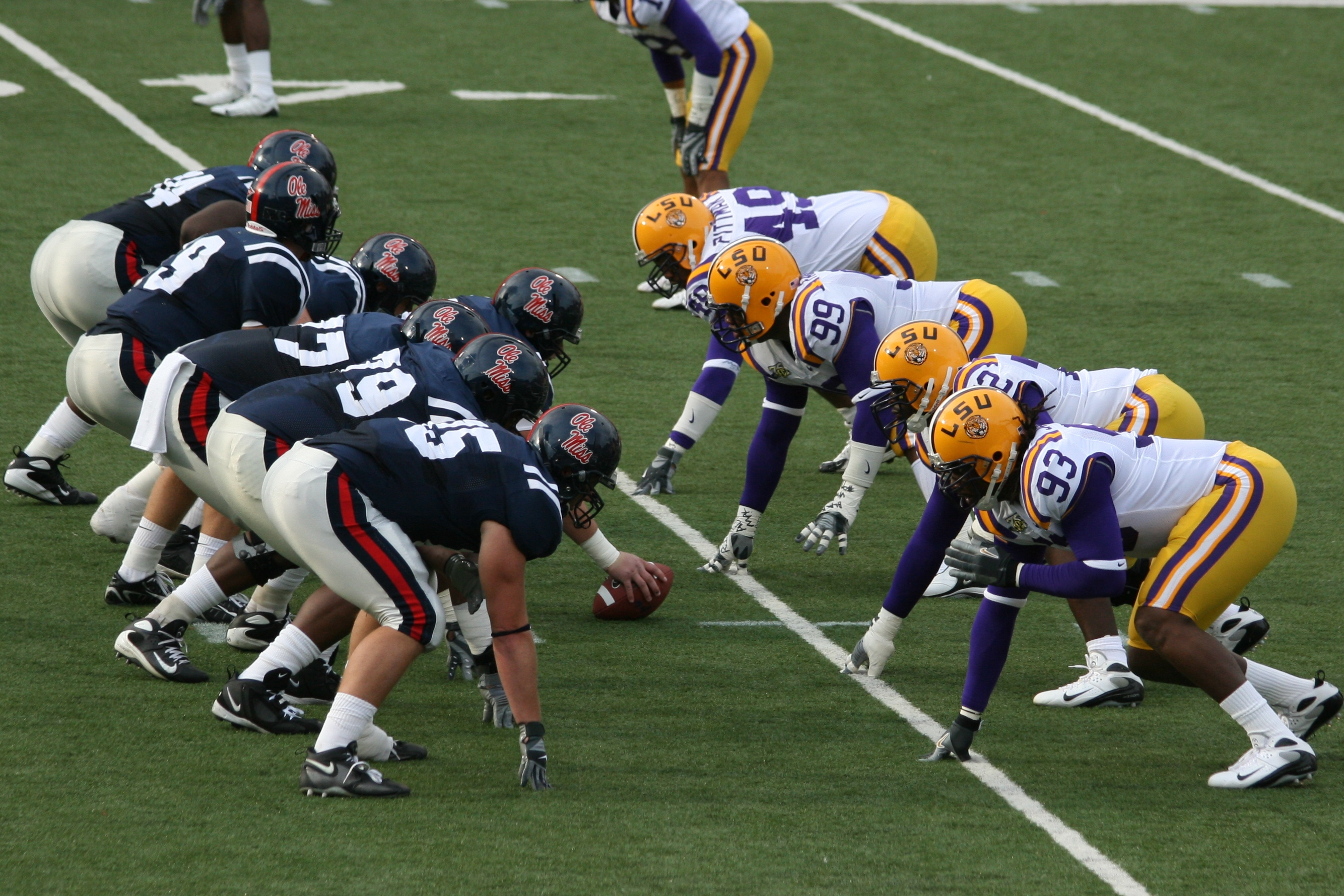
The 2007 Magnolia Bowl

It is the second most played rivalry for both teams. The 2011 edition in Oxford was the 100th meeting between the two schools. It was also the most lopsided game in series history, as top-ranked LSU defeated Ole Miss and coach Houston Nutt 52–3. In many cases, wins have come in streaks with the longest being 8, (LSU: 1928–1937). The next longest win streak is 6, a total reached by both Ole Miss and LSU. The Tigers won from 2002 to 2007, while the Rebels were able to defeat LSU from 1952 to 1957. LSU leads the series 64–44–4, with Ole Miss having vacated one victory and LSU vacating two.

== Notable games ==
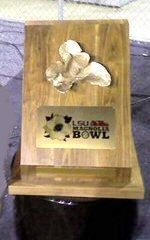
Magnolia Bowl Trophy

- 1959 – Cannon's Halloween Run – Late in the game between #1 LSU and #3 Ole Miss, LSU was trailing 3–0. Then Billy Cannon returned a punt 89 yards for a TD, breaking seven tackles. The Rebels then drove down the field but were stopped on the LSU 1-yard line as the game ended resulting in a 7–3 victory for LSU in Tiger Stadium. The Rebels would get revenge however in the Sugar Bowl by defeating the Tigers 21–0, and were declared national champions by several polls.
- 1960 – LSU fought Ole Miss to a 6–6 tie which was the Rebels' only blemish (9–0–1) en route to a 1960 national title and were awarded the Grantland Rice Trophy by the Football Writers Association of America.
- 1971 – Ole Miss defeated LSU 24–22 at Jackson in the last major college football game between two all-white squads. The Rebels and Tigers each fielded their first black varsity players the next season.
- 1972 – Jones to Davis;. "The Night The Clock Stopped" – #6 LSU survived an upset bid from unranked Ole Miss in Tiger Stadium by winning the game on a TD pass from QB Bert Jones to RB Brad Davis. Ole Miss fans say the 1972 contest featured a few seconds of free football. The Tigers trailed the Rebels 16–10 with four seconds to play and the ball on the Ole Miss ten-yard line. After a short incompletion by Jones to Jimmy LeDoux at the goal line, the game clock still showed one second remaining. The Tigers used the precious second to win the game on the "last play", 17–16. The home-clock advantage inspired a sign at the Louisiana state line reading, "You are now entering Louisiana. Set your clocks back four seconds."
- 1989 – The 1989 contest in Oxford, the first visit by LSU to the Ole Miss campus since 1960, proved to have a much different flavor than most college football games. One week earlier, Rebels safety Chucky Mullins suffered a career-ending (and ultimately, fatal) injury making a tackle vs. Vanderbilt. The student body passed buckets around the stadium to a then record crowd of 42,700 at Vaught–Hemingway Stadium. In excess of $150,000 was raised for the Mullins fund. The Rebels nearly pulled off a comeback of 21 points against the 1–6 Tigers, only to have the ball intercepted in the end zone in the waning seconds, allowing LSU to hold on for a 35–30 victory.
- 1997 – The Rebels upset #7 LSU 36–21 one week after the Tigers shocked the then top-ranked Florida Gators. It would spark a three-game winning streak against the Tigers, including a thrilling overtime victory in 1998 (37–31).
- 2003 – Ole Miss entered the game an undefeated 6–0 in SEC conference play while LSU entered the game with only a loss to Florida. The winner of this game would represent the SEC West in the SEC Championship Game in Atlanta. If Ole Miss won, they would be the outright SEC West champion and make the SEC Championship game for the first time. If LSU won, both teams would be SEC West co-champions but LSU would go to Atlanta due to the head-to-head victory tiebreaker. LSU won the game 17–14, which was played before the then all-time record crowd to ever watch an on-campus football game in Mississippi. The Tigers then went on to win both the SEC championship in Atlanta and the BCS national championship.
- 2008 – Ole Miss beat #18 LSU 31–13 in Baton Rouge to snap a six-game losing streak to LSU and to win the first Magnolia Bowl trophy.
- 2009 – With nine seconds remaining, down by 2 (25–23) on 4th and 26, LSU completed a 40-yard pass to the Ole Miss six-yard line, leaving one second left on the clock. In the culmination of a series of late-game miscues, LSU attempted to spike the ball, rather than try for a potential game-winning field goal. This came shortly after Ole Miss running back Dexter McCluster elected not to attempt to recover an LSU onside kick even though replays clearly showed him near the ball at one point and the Tigers received a fortuitous bounce and recovered it. However, with no timeouts, they did not have enough time to execute any sort of play as time expired before LSU could even get off a snap. Ole Miss won the game by a score of 25–23, prevailing for their first win at home against LSU since 1998. This was also the first time the Rebels defeated the Tigers two years in a row in regulation since the late 1960's before integration of both teams took place.
- 2013 – LSU came into Oxford ranked #6 facing an unranked Ole Miss team that had lost their last 3 games. Buoyed by 3 Zach Mettenberger interceptions, however, Ole Miss took a 17–0 lead a third of the way into the third quarter. LSU would then take advantage of numerous Ole Miss miscues and, following a blocked Andrew Ritter field goal and a 4th and long conversion, tied the game at 24 via a Mettenberger touchdown pass to wide receiver Jarvis Landry. But Ole Miss quarterback Bo Wallace would lead a drive that brought the Rebels to the LSU 24 and was highlighted by two 3rd down conversions in Ole Miss territory. Ritter redeemed himself with a 41-yard field goal with 2 seconds left, putting Ole Miss up 27–24 for good. The upset win gave Ole Miss their first victory over LSU since 2009. Ole Miss would later vacate this win due to NCAA violations.
- 2014 – Undefeated #3 Ole Miss came into Death Valley facing the 6–2 #24 LSU Tigers. Early in the game, LSU had multiple chances to put points on the board, but failed to do so, missing a 29-yard field goal and fumbling the ball on the goal line. Ole Miss struck first with a late first-quarter touchdown, but LSU's young defense did not allow Ole Miss to score another point. LSU's offense shot themselves in the foot against one of the best defenses in the country, fumbling twice and throwing two interceptions. At halftime, Ole Miss led 7–3; midway through the fourth quarter LSU was given the ball at their own 5-yard line. LSU ran the ball 12 straight times on the backs of Leonard Fournette and Kenny Hilliard, but it would be Anthony Jennings who threw a 3-yard touchdown pass to TE Logan Stokes, his first catch of his career, to take the lead 10–7. Ole Miss was given another chance to win the game. Bo Wallace converted multiple times on third and fourth down to drive Ole Miss down the field. With 9 seconds left Ole Miss had the ball on LSU's 25, and prepared to send out the kicker for a 42-yard field goal; however, due to a delay of game penalty the ball was moved to the 30. Ole Miss kept their freshman kicker on the field, but when LSU head coach Les Miles called a timeout Ole Miss sent Bo Wallace and the offense back onto the field. Instead of attempting a short pass to the sidelines, Bo Wallace threw an under-thrown ball to the end zone where it was intercepted by senior safety Ronald Martin. LSU won the game 10–7 and ended Ole Miss's undefeated season and possible shot to go to the first annual College Football Playoffs.
- 2015 – Ole Miss quarterback Chad Kelly threw for 280 yards and two touchdowns as Ole Miss won the 2015 Magnolia Bowl over LSU by a commanding margin of 38–17. Having entered the game with losses to rivals Alabama and Arkansas over the previous two games, the loss marked LSU's first three-game losing streak in a season since 1999. The loss also increased chatter and rumors about LSU head coach Les Miles' job security, and Miles would be fired as LSU head coach in September 2016.
- 2017 – When asked about what he remembered most about his time at Ole Miss in a press conference the week before the 2017 Magnolia Bowl, LSU head coach Ed Orgeron (who had previously been Ole Miss' head coach from 2005 to 2007) replied, "You know, I used to stop at the Exxon and get chicken on a stick, and it was fantastic." The comment was seen as an insult and infuriated many Ole Miss fans. In Orgeron's first time back in Oxford as LSU head coach, #24 LSU defeated Ole Miss by a score of 40–24.
- 2021 – The 2021 edition of the Magnolia Bowl was of particular importance for Ole Miss due to the game featuring the jersey retirement ceremony of the Number 10, worn by Rebel legend Eli Manning at halftime. As such, the end zones featured Manning's last name painted white with the Rebels’ signature red background. Despite the Tigers’ promising start—which included a 90-yard scoring drive on the opening possession—the twelfth-ranked Rebels’ high-scoring offense overpowered the LSU defense and jumped out to a 17–7 halftime lead thanks to a 43-yard field goal from kicker Caden Costa and both a passing and rushing touchdown from quarterback Matt Corral. The Rebels stretched the lead to 24 by the end of the third quarter due to a pair of rushing scores courtesy of running backs Henry Parrish Jr. and Jerrion Ealy, which effectively put the game out of reach for the Tigers. Ole Miss went on to defeat LSU 31–17, ending the Tigers’ five game winning streak in the rivalry. This was Ole Miss' only victory over LSU during former Rebels head coach Ed Orgeron's time leading the LSU football program.
- 2023 – The 2023 edition was the first matchup since 2016 where both teams were ranked in the Top 25. LSU was ranked #13 with just a 45–24 loss to #5 Florida State on their resume, while #20 Ole Miss had lost 24–10 to Alabama in Tuscaloosa the week before. Ole Miss' high-scoring offense got to work quickly, holding a 21–7 lead to start the second quarter. The Rebels ultimately found themselves leading LSU 31–28 after the Tigers missed a field goal right before halftime. The second half turned into a scoring frenzy, and LSU went up 42-34 right before the 4th quarter. Ole Miss then scored a few plays later, but missed the 2-point conversion, which put the score at 42-40 LSU. Later, a controversial touchdown call put LSU in front 49–40, but Ole Miss was able to respond with another touchdown of their own, which made the score 49–47. With 39 seconds left to play, Ole Miss took a 55–49 lead after a successful touchdown and 2-point conversion, but LSU still had plenty of opportunities to win. LSU's Jayden Daniels threw 2 incomplete passes, however Ole Miss' Jeremiah Jean-Baptiste committed a horse collar penalty against Daniels, which resulted in an LSU first down. Daniels threw another incomplete pass, however, and there were 5 seconds left to play. Ole Miss head coach Lane Kiffin called a timeout and told his players to avoid getting a pass interference penalty, as the Rebels had already gotten way more penalties than LSU that night. Jayden Daniels threw one last pass to the endzone on 2nd down, but it was broken up, and Ole Miss won 55–49. Fans rushed the field in celebration, resulting in a $100,000 fine levied by the Southeastern Conference, and this win not only put Ole Miss' record at 4–1, but also essentially eliminated LSU from the College Football Playoff race as the Tigers fell to 3–2. The 2023 Magnolia Bowl is the highest-scoring game in the history of the rivalry.
- 2024 - Despite never taking the lead in regulation, #13 LSU managed to win in overtime 29-26 upsetting #9 Ole Miss. LSU would move up to #8 in the polls while Ole Miss fell to #18. LSU never led during the game, but won due to a walk-off touchdown reception by Kyren Lacy in overtime.
- 2025 - This was the first time that both LSU (4–0) and Ole Miss (4–0) came into the game undefeated since 1959. LSU started off their season with a win at #4 Clemson and eventually climbed up to #4 in the rankings. Ole Miss was ranked #13. LSU scored first to go up 7–0, but the Tigers would never regain the lead for the rest of the game. Ole Miss led 17–7 at halftime, and the Rebels cruised to a 24–19 upset over the 4th-ranked Tigers. Ole Miss quarterback Trinidad Chambliss (who previously played for Division II Ferris State) threw for 314 yards and a touchdown, while LSU quarterback Garrett Nussmeier struggled, throwing for just 197 yards, a touchdown, and an interception. The win for Ole Miss moved the Rebels to 5–0 on the season, and they would jump all the way up to #4 in the rankings a day later. The two programs saw different trajectories following this game as well. Ole Miss went on to finish with an 11–1 record (with their only loss being a 43–35 loss to Georgia in Athens), while LSU fired Brian Kelly after a home loss to Texas A&M in late October and ultimately finished 7–5. Adding even more fuel to the rivalry, Ole Miss head coach Lane Kiffin accepted the LSU head coaching job after the conclusion of the regular season.
- 2026 - After Kiffin's departure from Ole Miss, to LSU in 2025, college football fans eagerly awaited Kiffin's return to Ole Miss and Oxford, Mississippi. Both LSU and Ole Miss came into the week 3 matchup with a 2–0 record, with LSU and Ole Miss ranked #7 and #8 in the AP poll respectively. College GameDay announced they would be attending the game in Oxford. According to law enforcement sources, horseback police units from New Orleans and Jackson, Mississippi were brought in to Oxford for security, crowd control and fan management. In the leadup to the game, Kiffin said in a press conference: "I told the players today, you don't have anything to worry about as far as like attention on you all week. There's just going to be so much attention, hatred, everything on me, I said, 'You just get to go play, I said really the pressure's on them (in reference to Ole Miss)." In the game, Ole Miss went up 17–0 and led 24–7 at halftime. They didn't score at all in the 3rd quarter as LSU cut the deficit to 24–21 and eventually tied the game at 24 a piece early in the 4th quarter. Ole Miss took the lead for good with 6:14 to go thanks to a 14-yard rushing touchdown from Trinidad Chambliss and a 2-point run from JT Lindsey. LSU ended up getting the ball back and eventually got all the way to the red zone in Ole Miss territory but could not score as Sam Leavitt threw an interception with 59 seconds left. Ole Miss won the game 32–24.

== Game results ==
LSU victories	Ole Miss victories	Ties	Vacated wins

No.	Date	Location	Winner	Score
1	December 3, 1894	Baton Rouge, LA	Ole Miss	26–6
2	November 13, 1896	Vicksburg, MS	LSU	12–4
3	November 3, 1899	Meridian, MS	Ole Miss	11–0
4	November 7, 1901	Baton Rouge, LA	LSU	46–0
5	November 8, 1902	New Orleans, LA	LSU	6–0
6	November 21, 1903	New Orleans, LA	Ole Miss	11–0
7	November 5, 1904	Baton Rouge, LA	LSU	5–0
8	October 20, 1906	Baton Rouge, LA	Ole Miss	9–0
9	November 16, 1907	Jackson, MS	LSU	23–0
10	October 9, 1909	Baton Rouge, LA	LSU	10–0
11	October 19, 1912	Baton Rouge, LA	Ole Miss	10–7
12	October 17, 1914	Baton Rouge, LA	Ole Miss	21–0
13	October 15, 1915	Oxford, MS	LSU	28–0
14	November 18, 1916	Baton Rouge, LA	LSU	41–0
15	October 13, 1917	Oxford, MS	LSU	52–7
16	October 18, 1919	Baton Rouge, LA	LSU	13–0
17	November 12, 1921	Baton Rouge, LA	LSU	24–0
18	November 13, 1926	Baton Rouge, LA	LSU	3–0
19	November 5, 1927	Oxford, MS	Ole Miss	12–7
20	November 10, 1928	Baton Rouge, LA	LSU	19–6
21	November 16, 1929	Baton Rouge, LA	LSU	13–6
22	November 8, 1930	Baton Rouge, LA	LSU	6–0
23	November 13, 1931	Jackson, MS	LSU	26–3
24	November 18, 1933	Baton Rouge, LA	LSU	31–0
25	November 17, 1934	Jackson, MS	LSU	14–0
26	October 17, 1936	Baton Rouge, LA	LSU	13–0
27	October 16, 1937	Baton Rouge, LA	LSU	13–7
28	September 24, 1938	Baton Rouge, LA	Ole Miss	20–7
29	September 30, 1939	Baton Rouge, LA	Ole Miss	14–7
30	September 28, 1940	Baton Rouge, LA	Ole Miss	19–6
31	November 8, 1941	Baton Rouge, LA	#16 Ole Miss	13–12
32	October 17, 1942	Baton Rouge, LA	LSU	21–7
33	November 3, 1945	Baton Rouge, LA	#17 LSU	32–13
34	November 2, 1946	Baton Rouge, LA	LSU	34–21
35	November 1, 1947	Baton Rouge, LA	Ole Miss	20–18
36	October 30, 1948	Baton Rouge, LA	Ole Miss	49–19
37	October 29, 1949	Baton Rouge, LA	#17 LSU	34–7
38	November 4, 1950	Baton Rouge, LA	LSU	40–14
39	November 3, 1951	Baton Rouge, LA	Tie	6–6
40	November 1, 1952	Oxford, MS	Ole Miss	28–0
41	October 31, 1953	Baton Rouge, LA	#18 Ole Miss	27–16
42	October 30, 1954	Baton Rouge, LA	#12 Ole Miss	21–6
43	October 29, 1955	Baton Rouge, LA	Ole Miss	29–26
44	November 3, 1956	Baton Rouge, LA	Ole Miss	46–17
45	November 9, 1957	Oxford, MS	#14 Ole Miss	14–12
46	November 1, 1958	Baton Rouge, LA	#1 LSU	14–0
47	October 31, 1959	Baton Rouge, LA	#1 LSU	7–3
48	January 1, 1960	New Orleans, LA	#2 Ole Miss	21–0
49	October 29, 1960	Oxford, MS	Tie	6–6
50	November 4, 1961	Baton Rouge, LA	#6 LSU	10–7
51	November 3, 1962	Baton Rouge, LA	#6 Ole Miss	15–7
52	November 2, 1963	Baton Rouge, LA	#3 Ole Miss	37–3
53	October 31, 1964	Baton Rouge, LA	#9 LSU	11–10
54	October 30, 1965	Jackson, MS	Ole Miss	23–0
55	October 29, 1966	Baton Rouge, LA	Ole Miss	17–0
56	November 29, 1967	Jackson, MS	Tie	13–13
57	November 2, 1968	Baton Rouge, LA	Ole Miss	27–24
58	November 1, 1969	Jackson, MS	Ole Miss	26–23
59	December 5, 1970	Baton Rouge, LA	#8 LSU	61–17

No.	Date	Location	Winner	Score
60	October 30, 1971	Jackson, MS	Ole Miss	24–22
61	November 4, 1972	Baton Rouge, LA	#6 LSU	17–16
62	November 3, 1973	Jackson, MS	#7 LSU	51–14
63	November 2, 1974	Baton Rouge, LA	LSU	24–0
64	November 1, 1975	Jackson, MS	Ole Miss	17–13
65	October 30, 1976	Baton Rouge, LA	LSU	45–0
66	October 29, 1977	Jackson, MS	LSU	28–21
67	November 4, 1978	Baton Rouge, LA	#12 LSU	30–8
68	November 3, 1979	Jackson, MS	LSU	28–24
69	November 1, 1980	Baton Rouge, LA	LSU	38–16
70	October 31, 1981	Jackson, MS	Tie	27–27
71	October 30, 1982	Baton Rouge, LA	#13 LSU	45–8
72	October 29, 1983	Jackson, MS	Ole Miss	27–24
73	November 3, 1984	Baton Rouge, LA	LSU	32–29
74	November 2, 1985	Jackson, MS	LSU	14–0
75	November 1, 1986	Baton Rouge, LA	Ole Miss	21–19
76	October 31, 1987	Jackson, MS	#5 LSU	42–13
77	October 29, 1988	Baton Rouge, LA	#13 LSU	31–20
78	November 4, 1989	Oxford, MS	LSU	35–30
79	November 3, 1990	Baton Rouge, LA	#17 Ole Miss	19–10
80	November 2, 1991	Jackson, MS	LSU	25–22
81	October 31, 1992	Jackson, MS	Ole Miss	32–0
82	October 30, 1993	Baton Rouge, LA	LSU	19–17
83	October 29, 1994	Oxford, MS	Ole Miss	34–21
84	November 11, 1995	Baton Rouge, LA	LSU	38–9
85	November 16, 1996	Oxford, MS	#17 LSU	39–7
86	November 26, 1997	Baton Rouge, LA	Ole Miss	36–21
87	October 31, 1998	Oxford, MS	Ole Miss	37–31^{OT}
88	October 30, 1999	Baton Rouge, LA	#25 Ole Miss	42–23
89	November 11, 2000	Oxford, MS	LSU	20–9
90	October 27, 2001	Baton Rouge, LA	Ole Miss	35–24
91	November 23, 2002	Baton Rouge, LA	#21 LSU	14–13
92	November 22, 2003	Oxford, MS	#3 LSU	17–14
93	November 20, 2004	Baton Rouge, LA	#14 LSU	27–24
94	November 19, 2005	Oxford, MS	#4 LSU	40–7
95	November 18, 2006	Baton Rouge, LA	#9 LSU	23–20
96	November 17, 2007	Oxford, MS	#1 LSU	41–24
97	November 22, 2008	Baton Rouge, LA	Ole Miss	31–13
98	November 21, 2009	Oxford, MS	Ole Miss	25–23
99	November 20, 2010	Baton Rouge, LA	#5 LSU	43–36
100	November 19, 2011	Oxford, MS	#1 LSU	52–3
101	November 17, 2012	Baton Rouge, LA	#8 LSU^{*}	41–35
102	October 19, 2013	Oxford, MS	Ole Miss^{†}	27–24
103	October 25, 2014	Baton Rouge, LA	#24 LSU^{*}	10–7
104	November 21, 2015	Oxford, MS	#22 Ole Miss	38–17
105	October 22, 2016	Baton Rouge, LA	#25 LSU	38–21
106	October 21, 2017	Oxford, MS	#24 LSU	40–24
107	September 29, 2018	Baton Rouge, LA	#5 LSU	45–16
108	November 16, 2019	Oxford, MS	#1 LSU	58–37
109	December 19, 2020	Baton Rouge, LA	LSU	53–48
110	October 23, 2021	Oxford, MS	#12 Ole Miss	31–17
111	October 22, 2022	Baton Rouge, LA	LSU	45–20
112	September 30, 2023	Oxford, MS	#20 Ole Miss	55–49
113	October 12, 2024	Baton Rouge, LA	#13 LSU	29–26 ^{OT}
114	September 27, 2025	Oxford, MS	#13 Ole Miss	24–19
115	September 19, 2026	Oxford, MS	#8 Ole Miss	32–24
Series: LSU leads 64–44–4
* Vacated by LSU † Vacated by Ole Miss (Note: The 2013 game was won on the field 27–24 by Ole Miss. However, the win was vacated along with all others that season except for the Music City Bowl. According to the NCAA, a vacated win doesn't benefit the record of the opponent. The LSU media guide correctly accounts for its record even though it does not match the Ole Miss record. Vacated wins cause records of two teams to be out of balance with the total number of games played and different for each program.)

== See also ==
- List of NCAA college football rivalry games
- List of most-played college football series in NCAA Division I
