= 1970 Virginia Cavaliers football team =

American college football season

1970 Virginia Cavaliers football
- Conference: Atlantic Coast Conference
- Record: 5–6 (0–6 ACC)
- Head coach: George Blackburn (6th season)
- Captains: Dan Ryczek; Paul Reid
- Home stadium: Scott Stadium

1970 Atlantic Coast Conference football standings
	Conf.					Overall
Team	W		L		T	W		L		T
Wake Forest $	5	–	1	–	0	6	–	5	–	0
North Carolina	5	–	2	–	0	8	–	4	–	0
Duke	5	–	2	–	0	6	–	5	–	0
South Carolina	3	–	2	–	1	4	–	6	–	1
NC State	2	–	3	–	1	3	–	7	–	1
Clemson	2	–	4	–	0	3	–	8	–	0
Maryland	2	–	4	–	0	2	–	9	–	0
Virginia	0	–	6	–	0	5	–	6	–	0
$ – Conference champion; Rankings from AP Poll

The 1970 Virginia Cavaliers football team represented the University of Virginia during the 1970 NCAA University Division football season. The Cavaliers were led by sixth-year head coach George Blackburn and played their home games at Scott Stadium in Charlottesville, Virginia. They competed as members of the Atlantic Coast Conference, finishing in last. At the conclusion of the season, Blackburn was fired as head coach. He had a record of 28–33–0 at Virginia, with just one winning season, in 1968.

== Schedule ==
Date	Opponent	Site	Result	Attendance	Source
September 12	at Virginia Tech*	Lane Stadium; Blacksburg, VA (rivalry)	W 7–0	23,000	
September 19	at Clemson	Memorial Stadium; Clemson, SC	L 17–27	29,218	
September 26	at Duke	Wallace Wade Stadium; Durham, NC	L 7–17	24,478	
October 3	Wake Forest^{†}	Scott Stadium; Charlottesville, VA	L 7–27	21,500	
October 10	VMI*	Scott Stadium; Charlottesville, VA	W 49–10	15,500	
October 17	Army*	Scott Stadium; Charlottesville, VA	W 21–20	29,100	
October 24	William & Mary*	Scott Stadium; Charlottesville, VA	W 33–6	17,800	
October 31	at North Carolina	Kenan Memorial Stadium; Chapel Hill, NC (South's Oldest Rivalry)	L 15–30	32,500	
November 7	at NC State	Carter Stadium; Raleigh, NC	L 16–21	25,955	
November 14	Colgate*	Scott Stadium; Charlottesville, VA	W 54–12	13,300	
November 21	Maryland	Scott Stadium; Charlottesville, VA (rivalry)	L 14–17	14,000	
*Non-conference game; ^{†}Homecoming

== Roster ==
1970 Virginia Cavaliers football team roster
Players
Coaches
Offense

Pos.	#	Name	Class
G	71	Joe Ryan
C	51	Dan Ryczek	Sr
OT	69	Joe Scott
WR	44	Dave Sullivan	So
QB	12	Bill Troup

Defense

Pos.	#	Name	Class
DT	72	Andy Selfridge	Jr

Special teams

Pos.	#	Name	Class

Head coach

- Dick Bestwick

Coordinators/assistant coaches

Legend

- (C) Team captain
- (S) Suspended
- (I) Ineligible
- Injured
- Redshirt
