= Chinese Bandits =

Defensive unit on late 1950s LSU football teams

The Chinese Bandits, photographed by George Silk for the October 12, 1959 issue of LIFE.

The Chinese Bandits were the backup defensive unit on coach Paul Dietzel's LSU Tigers football teams, most notably the 1958 and 1959 teams. The name was also used briefly by the Army Cadets football team during Dietzel's coaching tenure at the U.S. Military Academy. At LSU, they made up the third unit of Dietzel's "three-platoon system." While they lacked experience and talent, the Bandits were notable for their tenacity and toughness. The unit was hugely popular among fans, and has since become part of LSU sports lore.

== Background ==
In 1958, LSU head coach Paul Dietzel experimented with different methods of keeping players rested. He implemented his "three-platoon system," which split the team into the "White Team," the "Go Team," and the "Chinese Bandits." Each platoon was a unit consisting of eleven players. The White Team was the starting unit. It consisted of the team's most talented players who excelled on both offense and defense. The Go Team was the second string unit that played primarily on offense. The Chinese Bandits were the team's second string defense, and was made up of mainly underclassmen. Dietzel's plan was to swap players out in a platoon-like fashion in order to keep them rested throughout the game. Instead of resting individual players, he replaced all eleven players on the field. Under the rules of the one-platoon system of the time, there were strict limits on how players could be substituted; once a player was pulled from the game, they could not re-enter the game until the next quarter. The Go Team and the Chinese Bandits would thus be placed into the game, in most cases, near what would be anticipated to be the last offensive or defensive series of a quarter respectively, then replaced with the White Team at the beginning of the next.

Dietzel wanted to give the backups on the team an identity they could rally around and take pride in. He named the Chinese Bandits after characters from a Terry and the Pirates comic strip. The comic described the bandits as "the most vicious people in the world." He felt that the name fit with what he wanted to accomplish. Most players in the Bandits unit had seen very little playing time before the 1958 season. What they lacked in experience and skill, Dietzel hoped they would make up for with competitiveness and teamwork.

== Success ==
In the 1958 preseason, LSU was picked to finish ninth out of twelve teams in the Southeastern Conference. The Tigers had talent on offense, but most did not expect much from their young and inexperienced defense. However, the defense ended the season ranked first nationally in points allowed, as opposing teams averaged under 4.8 per game. The Bandits played nearly a quarter of LSU's total playing time, but came up with some of the biggest plays of the season and at crucial moments. In a tight game against Florida, the unit forced a fumble on the first play they were in the game, which led to the team's only touchdown in a 10–7 victory. The unit did not allow any points scored against them until the eighth game of the season, against Duke. The Bandits were also very effective at defending against the run. Opponents averaged 0.9 yards per carry against them, compared to the White Team, against whom opponents averaged 3.2 yards per carry. What the Bandits became most known for were their gang tackles and goal-line stands. One of these stands came in LSU's second game of the season, against Alabama in Bear Bryant's first game with the team, as the Tide were held at the 5-yard line and forced to kick a field goal. LSU won the game, 13–3. Bryant was quoted after the game as saying, "I've never seen a team with such raw speed. They just knocked our butts off!" The unit had another stand later that season against sixth-ranked Ole Miss, with the Rebels on the Tigers' one-yard line on second down. The Bandits stopped the Rebels on three straight scoring attempts and turned the ball over on downs, and LSU held on for a 14–0 victory. The next season, LSU's defense held opponents to an average of 143.2 offensive yards-per-game, the lowest yards-per-game average an LSU team has ever held opponents to in a season.

With Dietzel's platoon system in place, LSU won fifteen straight games through 1958 and 1959. Dietzel was named Coach of the Year by the AFCA and FWAA in 1958. The Tigers used the system until his departure from LSU after the 1961 season. The final game for the Bandits was the 1962 Orange Bowl, in which LSU defeated the Colorado Buffaloes 25–7. Overall, LSU compiled a record of 35–7–1 in the four seasons that it was in use.

== Lineup ==
1958 Chinese Bandits
Name	Year	Position
Mel Branch	Jr.	DE
Emile Fournet	Jr.	DT
Tommy Lott	Jr.	DT
Duane Leopard	Soph.	DT
Gaynell Kinchen	Soph.	DE
John Langan	Jr.	LLB
Merle Schexnaildre	Jr.	RLB
Andy Bourgeois	Soph.	CB
Darryl Jenkins	Soph.	S
Henry Lee Roberts	Soph.	S
Hart Bourque	Soph.	CB

== Popularity and legacy ==
Although they were backups, the Chinese Bandits became beloved and respected among the team due to their toughness and relentless style of play. Dietzel himself proclaimed, "One of the greatest thrills I had in the coaching business was the Chinese Bandits." Players considered it a privilege to play in the unit. One player even refused his promotion to the starting unit so he could remain a Bandit. Another player, Merle Schexnaildre, happily accepted a move from fullback to linebacker as a junior. Said defensive coach Charles McClendon of the unit:

"They didn't know they weren't a good football team – nobody ever told them. They were 100-percent go-getters."

The Bandits were hugely popular among fans. In 1958, a local restaurant gave away free Asian conical hats with meals and sold over 1,400 of them in a single day. A disk jockey wrote a song about the unit, which the LSU band played whenever the unit took the field. A photograph by George Silk of the Bandits dressed in their football uniforms and wearing masks that resembled aged Chinese men were featured in the October 12, 1959 issue of LIFE. They live on today in the "Tiger Bandits" song, played by the LSU marching band after the defense stops an opponent on third down or forces a turnover. LSU fans bow to the defense as the song is played.

When Dietzel left LSU in 1961 to coach at the U.S. Military Academy, the Chinese Bandits name was carried over to the Army football team. However, the team dropped the "Chinese" part of the name in 1964 in response to criticism due to international political tensions at the time. As it was, free substitution was reintroduced to college football in 1964, rendering the system obsolete.

== See also ==
- Billy Cannon's Halloween run
- Songs of LSU
