= 1970 NC State Wolfpack football team =

American college football season

1970 NC State Wolfpack football
- Conference: Atlantic Coast Conference
- Record: 3–7–1 (2–3–1 ACC)
- Head coach: Earle Edwards (17th season)
- Home stadium: Carter Stadium

1970 Atlantic Coast Conference football standings
	Conf.					Overall
Team	W		L		T	W		L		T
Wake Forest $	5	–	1	–	0	6	–	5	–	0
North Carolina	5	–	2	–	0	8	–	4	–	0
Duke	5	–	2	–	0	6	–	5	–	0
South Carolina	3	–	2	–	1	4	–	6	–	1
NC State	2	–	3	–	1	3	–	7	–	1
Clemson	2	–	4	–	0	3	–	8	–	0
Maryland	2	–	4	–	0	2	–	9	–	0
Virginia	0	–	6	–	0	5	–	6	–	0
$ – Conference champion; Rankings from AP Poll

The 1970 NC State Wolfpack football team represented North Carolina State University during the 1970 NCAA University Division football season. The Wolfpack were led by head coach Earle Edwards, in his 17th and final year with the team, and played their home games at Carter Stadium in Raleigh, North Carolina. They competed as members of the Atlantic Coast Conference, finishing in fifth.

Edwards retired at the end of the season, finishing with the Wolfpack's longest tenure (17 seasons) and most wins (77) as coach, the former of which still stands today, while the latter was not eclipsed until Dave Doeren surpassed Edwards in 2023. He had a record of 77–88–8 at NC State.

== Schedule ==
Date	Opponent	Site	Result	Attendance	Source
September 12	at Richmond*	City Stadium; Richmond, VA	L 6–21	14,000	
September 19	at North Carolina	Kenan Memorial Stadium; Chapel Hill, NC (rivalry)	L 0–19	44,300	
September 26	South Carolina	Carter Stadium; Raleigh, NC	T 7–7	25,200	
October 3	at Florida*	Florida Field; Gainesville, FL	L 6–14	53,068	
October 10	East Carolina*	Carter Stadium; Raleigh, NC (rivalry)	W 23–6	28,350	
October 17	Duke	Carter Stadium; Raleigh, NC (rivalry)	L 6–22	26,400	
October 24	vs. Maryland	Foreman Field; Norfolk, VA (Oyster Bowl)	W 6–0	18,200	
October 31	at Kentucky*	McLean Stadium; Lexington, KY	L 2–27	27,500	
November 7	Virginia	Carter Stadium; Raleigh, NC	W 21–16	25,955	
November 14	at Wake Forest	Groves Stadium; Winston-Salem, NC (rivalry)	L 13–16	31,000	
November 21	at Tulane*	Tulane Stadium; New Orleans, LA	L 0–31	19,542	
*Non-conference game

== Roster ==
1970 NC State Wolfpack football team roster
Players
Coaches
Offense

Pos.	#	Name	Class
RB	24	Butch Altman	Sr
WR	84	George Botsko	Sr
RB	22	Don Bradley	Jr
QB	11	Dennis Britt	Sr
TE	88	Mark Cassidy	So
QB	15	Gary Clements	Jr
C	52	Bill Culbertson	Sr
RB	27	Lynn Daniell	So
OT	78	John Elliott	Jr
RB	23	Tim Foley	Jr
RB	13	Jim Hardin	Sr
RB	25	Pat Kenney	So
QB	14	Pat Korsnick	Sr
WR	80	Steve Lester	So
QB	17	Darrell Moody	Sr
FB	33	Gary Moser	Jr
OT	72	Ed Nicholas	So
OT	77	Bill Phillips	Jr
FB	35	Dave Rodgers	Sr
WR	83	Gary Saul	Sr
G	65	John Saunderson	Jr
FB	31	Paul Sharp	Sr
WR	81	Pete Sowirka	Sr
G	63	Bill Yoest	So

Defense

Pos.	#	Name	Class
S	10	Mike Adamczyk	So
S	41	Dave Adamczyk	Jr
LB	53	Johnny Bradsher	Sr
DE	88	Clyde Chesney	Jr
DE	82	Bill Clark	Jr
LB	46	Mike Joyce	Sr
DT	70	Roger McSwain	So
DT	75	Dan Medlin	Jr
CB	44	Bill Miller	Jr
DE	85	Jim Nelson	So
CB	21	Bob Pilz	Jr
DE	87	Steve Rummage	Sr
S	45	Tommy Siegfried	Jr
DL	66	George Smith	Jr
CB	43	Jim Smith	Sr
CB	40	Van Walker	Jr
LB	32	Bryan Wall	Jr
LB	56	David Whitehead	Jr
S	42	Jack Whitley	Sr
LB	47	Stauber Wilson	So

Special teams

Pos.	#	Name	Class

Head coach

- Earle Edwards

Coordinators/assistant coaches

Legend

- (C) Team captain
- (S) Suspended
- (I) Ineligible
- Injured
- Redshirt
