= 1970 VMI Keydets football team =

American college football season

1970 VMI Keydets football
- Conference: Southern Conference
- Record: 1–10 (1–4 SoCon)
- Head coach: Vito Ragazzo (5th season)
- Home stadium: Alumni Memorial Field

1970 Southern Conference football standings
	Conf.					Overall
Team	W		L		T	W		L		T
William & Mary $	3	–	1	–	0	5	–	7	–	0
The Citadel	4	–	2	–	0	5	–	6	–	0
Furman	3	–	2	–	0	8	–	3	–	0
East Carolina	2	–	2	–	0	3	–	8	–	0
Richmond	3	–	3	–	0	4	–	6	–	0
Davidson	2	–	4	–	0	2	–	8	–	0
VMI	1	–	4	–	0	1	–	10	–	0
$ – Conference champion

The 1970 VMI Keydets football team was an American football team that represented the Virginia Military Institute (VMI) as a member of the Southern Conference (SoCon) during the 1970 NCAA University Division football season. In their fifth year under head coach Vito Ragazzo, the team compiled an overall record of 1–10 with a mark of 1–4 in conference play, placing last in the SoCon.

== Schedule ==
Date	Opponent	Site	Result	Attendance	Source
September 12	Furman	Alumni Memorial Field; Lexington, VA	W 13–0	5,000	
September 19	at Rice*	Rice Stadium; Houston, TX	L 0–42	15,000	
September 26	at No. 16 West Virginia*	Mountaineer Field; Morgantown, WV	L 10–47	27,500	
October 3	at Boston College*	Alumni Stadium; Chestnut Hill, MA	L 3–56	15,600	
October 10	at Virginia*	Scott Stadium; Charlottesville, VA	L 10–49	15,500	
October 17	William & Mary	Alumni Memorial Field; Lexington, VA (rivalry)	L 10–24	6,500	
October 24	at The Citadel	Johnson Hagood Stadium; Charleston, SC (rivalry)	L 9–56	17,345	
October 31	Davidson	Alumni Memorial Field; Lexington, VA	L 21–55	2,400	
November 7	at North Carolina*	Kenan Memorial Stadium; Chapel Hill, NC	L 13–62	28,500	
November 14	at Richmond	City Stadium; Richmond, VA (rivalry)	L 17–40	10,000	
November 21	vs. Virginia Tech*	Victory Stadium; Roanoke, VA (rivalry)	L 14–20	7,000	
*Non-conference game; Rankings from AP Poll released prior to the game
