= 1970 Wake Forest Demon Deacons football team =

American college football season

1970 Wake Forest Demon Deacons football

ACC champion
- Conference: Atlantic Coast Conference
- Record: 6–5 (5–1 ACC)
- Head coach: Cal Stoll (2nd season)
- Captain: Game captains
- Home stadium: Groves Stadium

1970 Atlantic Coast Conference football standings
	Conf.					Overall
Team	W		L		T	W		L		T
Wake Forest $	5	–	1	–	0	6	–	5	–	0
North Carolina	5	–	2	–	0	8	–	4	–	0
Duke	5	–	2	–	0	6	–	5	–	0
South Carolina	3	–	2	–	1	4	–	6	–	1
NC State	2	–	3	–	1	3	–	7	–	1
Clemson	2	–	4	–	0	3	–	8	–	0
Maryland	2	–	4	–	0	2	–	9	–	0
Virginia	0	–	6	–	0	5	–	6	–	0
$ – Conference champion; Rankings from AP Poll

The 1970 Wake Forest Demon Deacons football team was an American football team that represented Wake Forest University during the 1970 NCAA University Division football season. In its second season under head coach Cal Stoll, the team compiled a 6–5 record, finished in first place in the Atlantic Coast Conference with a 5–1 record against conference opponents.

== Schedule ==
Date	Opponent	Site	Result	Attendance	Source
September 12	at No. 9 Nebraska*	Memorial Stadium; Lincoln, NE	L 12–36	66,103	
September 19	at South Carolina	Carolina Stadium; Columbia, SC	L 7–43	42,219	
September 26	at Florida State*	Doak Campbell Stadium; Tallahassee, FL	L 14–19	27,196	
October 3	at Virginia	Scott Stadium; Charlottesville, VA	W 27–7	21,500	
October 10	Virginia Tech*	Groves Stadium; Winston-Salem, NC	W 28–9	18,500	
October 17	Clemson	Groves Stadium; Winston-Salem, NC	W 38–20	18,500	
October 24	North Carolina	Groves Stadium; Winston-Salem, NC (rivalry)	W 14–13	31,500	
October 31	at No. 9 Tennessee*	Memphis Memorial Stadium; Memphis, TN	L 7–41	26,381	
November 7	at Duke	Wallace Wade Stadium; Durham, NC (rivalry)	W 28–14	28,600	
November 14	NC State	Groves Stadium; Winston-Salem, NC (rivalry)	W 16–13	31,000	
November 21	at Houston*	Houston Astrodome; Houston, TX	L 2–26	28,569	
*Non-conference game; Rankings from AP Poll released prior to the game

== Team leaders ==
Category	Team Leader	Att/Cth	Yds
Passing	Larry Russell	55/109	671
Rushing	Larry Hopkins	203	984
Receiving	Gary Winrow	20	253
