= 1970 Richmond Spiders football team =

American college football season

1970 Richmond Spiders football
- Conference: Southern Conference
- Record: 4–6 (3–3 SoCon)
- Head coach: Frank Jones (5th season)
- Home stadium: City Stadium

1970 Southern Conference football standings
	Conf.					Overall
Team	W		L		T	W		L		T
William & Mary $	3	–	1	–	0	5	–	7	–	0
The Citadel	4	–	2	–	0	5	–	6	–	0
Furman	3	–	2	–	0	8	–	3	–	0
East Carolina	2	–	2	–	0	3	–	8	–	0
Richmond	3	–	3	–	0	4	–	6	–	0
Davidson	2	–	4	–	0	2	–	8	–	0
VMI	1	–	4	–	0	1	–	10	–	0
$ – Conference champion

The 1970 Richmond Spiders football team was an American football team that represented the University of Richmond as a member of the Southern Conference (SoCon) during the 1970 NCAA University Division football season. In their fifth season under head coach Frank Jones, Richmond compiled a 4–6 record, with a mark of 3–3 in conference play, finishing fifth in the SoCon.

== Schedule ==
Date	Opponent	Site	Result	Attendance	Source
September 12	NC State*	City Stadium; Richmond, VA	W 21–6	14,000	
September 19	at No. 17 West Virginia*	Mountaineer Field; Morgantown, WV	L 10–49	33,500	
September 26	Davidson	City Stadium; Richmond, VA	L 5–14	10,000	
October 3	at Southern Miss*	Faulkner Field; Hattiesburg, MS	L 21–43	9,422	
October 10	at Furman	Sirrine Stadium; Greenville, SC	L 9–23	4,500	
October 17	at Florida*	Florida Field; Gainesville, FL	L 0–20	51,471	
October 24	East Carolina	City Stadium; Richmond, VA (Tobacco Bowl)	W 38–12	14,500	
October 31	at The Citadel	Johnson Hagood Stadium; Charleston, SC	W 31–14		
November 14	VMI	City Stadium; Richmond, VA (rivalry)	W 40–17	10,000	
November 21	William & Mary	City Stadium; Richmond, VA (rivalry)	L 33–34	12,000	
*Non-conference game; Rankings from AP Poll released prior to the game
