= 1970 North Carolina Tar Heels football team =

American college football season

1970 North Carolina Tar Heels football

Peach Bowl, L 26–48 vs. Arizona State
- Conference: Atlantic Coast Conference
- Record: 8–4 (5–2 ACC)
- Head coach: Bill Dooley (4th season)
- Offensive coordinator: Bobby Collins (4th season)
- Defensive coordinator: Lee Hayley (4th season)
- Captains: Don McCauley; Flip Ray; Bill Richardson
- Home stadium: Kenan Memorial Stadium

1970 Atlantic Coast Conference football standings
	Conf.					Overall
Team	W		L		T	W		L		T
Wake Forest $	5	–	1	–	0	6	–	5	–	0
North Carolina	5	–	2	–	0	8	–	4	–	0
Duke	5	–	2	–	0	6	–	5	–	0
South Carolina	3	–	2	–	1	4	–	6	–	1
NC State	2	–	3	–	1	3	–	7	–	1
Clemson	2	–	4	–	0	3	–	8	–	0
Maryland	2	–	4	–	0	2	–	9	–	0
Virginia	0	–	6	–	0	5	–	6	–	0
$ – Conference champion; Rankings from AP Poll

The 1970 North Carolina Tar Heels football team represented the University of North Carolina at Chapel Hill during the 1970 NCAA University Division football season. The Tar Heels were led by fourth-year head coach Bill Dooley and played their home games at Kenan Memorial Stadium in Chapel Hill, North Carolina. They competed as members of the Atlantic Coast Conference, finishing in second.

The team's star player was running back Don McCauley, who broke O. J. Simpson's NCAA record for single season rushing yards with 1,720 yards. He was named ACC Player of the Year, was a consensus first-team All-American, and finished ninth in voting for the Heisman Trophy.

== Schedule ==
Date	Time	Opponent	Rank	Site	TV	Result	Attendance	Source
September 12	1:50 p.m.	Kentucky*		Kenan Memorial Stadium; Chapel Hill, NC		W 20–10	36,900	
September 19	1:50 p.m	NC State		Kenan Memorial Stadium; Chapel Hill, NC (rivalry)	ABC	W 19–0	44,300	
September 26	1:30 p.m.	at Maryland		Byrd Stadium; College Park, MD		W 53–20	20,806	
October 3	7:30 p.m.	at Vanderbilt*	No. 19	Dudley Field; Nashville, TN		W 10–7	20,400	
October 10	1:30 p.m.	South Carolina	No. 18	Kenan Memorial Stadium; Chapel Hill, NC (rivalry)		L 21–35	47,500	
October 17	7:30 p.m.	at Tulane*		Tulane Stadium; New Orleans, LA		L 17–24	23,900	
October 24	1:30 p.m.	at Wake Forest		Groves Stadium (II); Winston-Salem, NC (rivalry)		L 13–14	31,500	
October 31	1:30 p.m.	Virginia		Kenan Memorial Stadium; Chapel Hill, NC (South's Oldest Rivalry)		W 30–15	32,500	
November 7	1:30 p.m.	VMI*		Kenan Memorial Stadium; Chapel Hill, NC		W 62–13	28,500	
November 14		at Clemson		Memorial Stadium; Clemson, SC		W 42–7	28,914	
November 21	1:30 p.m.	Duke		Kenan Memorial Stadium; Chapel Hill, NC (Victory Bell)		W 59–34	48,600	
December 30	8:00 p.m.	vs. No. 8 Arizona State*		Grant Field; Atlanta, GA (Peach Bowl)		L 26–48	52,126	
*Non-conference game; Rankings from AP Poll released prior to the game; All times are in Eastern time

== Roster ==
1970 North Carolina Tar Heels football team roster
Players			Coaches
Offense: Pos. / # / Name / Class; RB / 23 / Don McCauley / Sr	Defense: Pos. / # / Name / Class; LB / 43 / John Bunting / Jr	Special teams: Pos. / # / Name / Class	Head coach: Bill Dooley; Coordinators/assistant coaches Legend: (C) Team captain; (S) Suspended; (I) Ineligible; Injured; Redshirt
