= Wendell Harris =

American football player (1940–2024)

No. 26
- Positions: Defensive back, placekicker

Personal information
- Born: October 2, 1940; Baton Rouge, Louisiana, U.S.
- Died: January 7, 2024 (aged 83); Baton Rouge, Louisiana, U.S.
- Listed height: 5 ft 11 in (1.80 m)
- Listed weight: 185 lb (84 kg)

Career information
- High school: Baton Rouge
- College: LSU
- NFL draft: 1962: 1st round, 9th overall pick
- AFL draft: 1962: 7th round, 51st overall pick

Career history
- Baltimore Colts (1962–1965); New York Giants (1966–1967); Texarkana Titans (1968)

Awards and highlights
- First-team All-SEC (1961)

Career NFL statistics
- Interceptions: 8
- Fumble recoveries: 7
- Total touchdowns: 1
- Stats at Pro Football Reference

Wendell Preston Harris Jr. (October 2, 1940 – January 7, 2024) was an American professional football player who was a defensive back in the National Football League (NFL) in the 1960s. He played college football for the LSU Tigers, guiding the Tigers to the 1961 Southeastern Conference championship and an Orange Bowl victory over Colorado.

Harris was selected ninth overall in the first round by the Baltimore Colts in the 1962 NFL draft. Harris, a first-round draft pick out of Louisiana State University, became an NFL kick and punt returner who played in other offensive positions as well, beginning his career in 1962 with the Baltimore Colts, coached by Weeb Ewbank. Assigned to both special teams and right cornerback, he returned 10 kicks or punts; his yards per return were 28.7, highest among his special-teammates. (All statistics here were gathered from pro-football-reference.com.)

Sharing the field in 1963 with such players as Johnny Unitas, and now coached by Don Shula, Harris returned 8 kicks for 198 yards, including a 41-yard run. His yards per return, 24.8, were eclipsed only by John Mackey's.

As Shula built the team, pushing it to 1st in the NFL West in 1964, Harris, #26, picked up 17 kicks and carried them for 214 yards, including a run of 39 yards. He also intercepted a ball for a 20-yard run.

In 1966 Harris moved to the New York Giants, a season of misery coached by Allie Sherman that left the Giants 8th in their division. Harris spent that longest season as a long-snapper for punters, with a total annual yardage of 9 for the year.

Harris died on January 7, 2024, at the age of 83.
