= 1970 Peach Bowl =

American college football game

- 3rd Peach Bowl
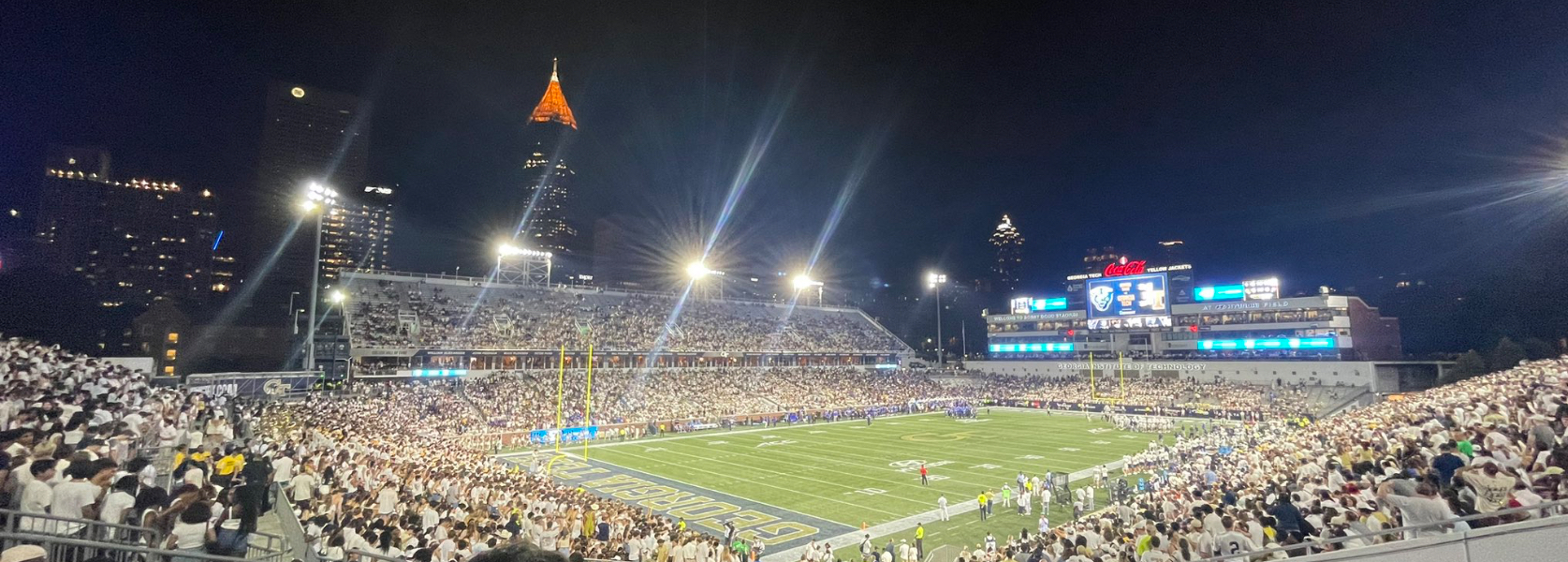
- Grant Field in Atlanta, Georgia, hosted the Peach Bowl.
Arizona State Sun Devils	North Carolina Tar Heels
(10–0)	(8–3)
WAC	ACC
48	26
Head coach: Frank Kush	Head coach: Bill Dooley
AP / Coaches; 8 / 8
	1	2	3	4	Total
Arizona State	7	14	20	7	48
North Carolina	0	26	0	0	26
- Date: December 30, 1970
- Season: 1970
- Stadium: Grant Field
- Location: Atlanta, Georgia
- MVP: HB Monroe Eley; DE Junior Ah You
- Referee: Wilburn Clary (ACC; split crew: ACC, WAC)
- Attendance: 52,126

United States TV coverage
- Network: Mizlou

The 1970 Peach Bowl was a college football bowl game between the Arizona State Sun Devils and the North Carolina Tar Heels.

== Background ==
The Sun Devils were champions of the Western Athletic Conference once again and were aiming for a perfect season. The Tar Heels finished tied for second in the Atlantic Coast Conference. Arizona State was invited after Penn State declined. A blizzard developed before gametime, with rain, sleet, and snow throughout the game.

== Game summary ==
Bob Thomas helped the Sun Devils jump out to a 14–0 lead before the Tar Heels responded in the second quarter with a Don McCauley touchdown run. J. D. Hill caught a touchdown pass from Joe Spagnola to make it 21–7 before the Tar heels exploded for 19 points before the quarter ended. McCauley ran for two touchdowns along with teammate Blanchard to give the Heels a 26–21 halftime lead. But the second half is where the Sun Devils took control, scoring 27 unanswered points on two touchdown runs by both Monroe Eley and touchdown runs by Thomas and Steve Holden to give the Sun Devils their first ever bowl win. Eley rushed for 173 yards to earn co-MVP honors while Junior Ah You earned co-MVP honors for knocking out quarterback Paul Miller.

== Aftermath ==
The Tar Heels would win three conference titles before Dooley left after the 1977 season. They have returned to this bowl four times since this game, the last time in 2001.

The Sun Devils finished ranked #6 in the polls. They would win five more WAC titles before joining the Pacific-10 Conference in 1978. Kush was fired during the middle of the 1979 season.

The Sun Devils will make their second Peach Bowl appearance in a 2024-25 College Football Playoff quarterfinal vs. the Texas Longhorns.

This was the final Peach Bowl played at Grant Field as it would move to Atlanta Stadium the following year.

== Scoring summary ==
- ASU – Thomas 8 run (Ekstrand kick)
- ASU – Thomas 33 run (Ekstrand kick)
- NC – McCauley 1 run (Craven kick)
- ASU – Hill 67 pass from Spagnola (Ekstrand kick)
- NC – Blanchard 36 pass from Miller (Craven kick)
- NC – McCauley 17 run (kick failed)
- NC – McCauley 4 run (pass failed)
- ASU – Eley 8 run (Ekstrand kick)
- ASU – Holden 13 run (kick failed)
- ASU – Eley 5 run (Ekstrand kick)
- ASU – Thomas 2 run (Ekstrand kick)
