= 1970 The Citadel Bulldogs football team =

American college football season

1970 The Citadel Bulldogs football
- Conference: Southern Conference
- Record: 5–6 (4–2 SoCon)
- Head coach: Red Parker (5th season)
- Home stadium: Johnson Hagood Stadium

1970 Southern Conference football standings
	Conf.					Overall
Team	W		L		T	W		L		T
William & Mary $	3	–	1	–	0	5	–	7	–	0
The Citadel	4	–	2	–	0	5	–	6	–	0
Furman	3	–	2	–	0	8	–	3	–	0
East Carolina	2	–	2	–	0	3	–	8	–	0
Richmond	3	–	3	–	0	4	–	6	–	0
Davidson	2	–	4	–	0	2	–	8	–	0
VMI	1	–	4	–	0	1	–	10	–	0
$ – Conference champion

The 1970 The Citadel Bulldogs football team represented The Citadel, The Military College of South Carolina in the 1970 NCAA University Division football season. Red Parker served as head coach for the fifth season. The Bulldogs played as members of the Southern Conference and played home games at Johnson Hagood Stadium.

== Schedule ==
Date	Opponent	Site	Result	Attendance	Source
September 12	at Clemson*	Memorial Stadium; Clemson, SC	L 0–24	33,908	
September 19	at Vanderbilt*	Dudley Field; Nashville, TN	L 0–52	17,333	
September 26	East Carolina	Johnson Hagood Stadium; Charleston, SC	W 31–0	17,420	
October 3	vs. No. 1 Arkansas State*	War Memorial Stadium; Little Rock, AR	L 7–24	16,000	
October 10	at William & Mary	Cary Field; Williamsburg, VA	W 16–7	10,000	
October 17	Bucknell*	Johnson Hagood Stadium; Charleston, SC	W 42–28	13,350	
October 24	VMI	Johnson Hagood Stadium; Charleston, SC (rivalry)	W 56–9	17,345	
October 31	Richmond	Johnson Hagood Stadium; Charleston, SC	L 14–31		
November 7	at Chattanooga*	Chamberlain Field; Chattanooga, TN	L 28–29		
November 14	at Furman	Sirrine Stadium; Greenville, SC (rivalry)	L 21–28		
November 21	Davidson^{†}	Johnson Hagood Stadium; Charleston, SC	W 44–9	15,250	
*Non-conference game; ^{†}Homecoming; Rankings from AP Poll released prior to the game

== NFL draft selections ==
Year	Round	Pick	Overall	Name	Team	Position
1970	1	12	12	John Small	Atlanta Falcons	Linebacker
