= 1962 Orange Bowl =

American college football bowl game

- 28th Orange Bowl
- The Miami Orange Bowl in Miami, Florida, hosted the Orange Bowl.
Colorado Buffaloes	LSU Tigers
(9–1)	(9–1)
Big Eight	SEC
7	25
Head coach: Sonny Grandelius	Head coach: Paul Dietzel
AP / Coaches; 7 / 7	AP / Coaches; 4 / 3
	1	2	3	4	Total
Colorado	0	7	0	0	7
LSU	5	6	14	0	25
- Date: January 1, 1962
- Season: 1961
- Stadium: Orange Bowl
- Location: Miami, Florida
- Favorite: LSU by 13 points
- Referee: Cliff Ogden (Big 8) (split crew: Big 8, SEC)
- Attendance: 62,391

United States TV coverage
- Network: ABC
- Announcers: Curt Gowdy, Paul Christman

The 1962 Orange Bowl was the 28th edition of the college football bowl game, played at the Orange Bowl in Miami, Florida, on Monday, January 1. Part of the 1961–62 bowl game season, the No. 4 LSU Tigers of the Southeastern Conference (SEC) defeated the No. 7 Colorado Buffaloes of the Big Eight Conference, 25–7.

== Teams ==
=== LSU ===
The Tigers, who slipped from an 11-0 national championship season in 1958 and a 9-2 follow-up in 1959 to 5-4-1 in 1960, recovered from a loss to Rice in their season opener to win their next nine games and tie Alabama for the SEC championship. The Tigers and Crimson Tide did not play, the third season of a five-year hiatus in the series.

LSU implemented their "three-platoon system." which included the "Chinese Bandits" defensive unit.

== Game summary ==
The game kicked off at 1 pm and was played in a drizzle, the first rain at an Orange Bowl.

=== Scoring ===
First quarter

- LSU - FG-Wendell Harris 30 yds; 3–0 LSU
- LSU - Safety—punt blocked out of end zone; 5–0 LSU

Second quarter

- Colo - TD-Loren Schweninger 59-yard interception return (Hillebrand kick); 5–7 Colorado
- LSU - TD-Charles Cranford 1-yard run (2-point conversion failed); 11–7 LSU

Third quarter

- LSU - TD-Jimmy Field 9-yard run (Harris kick); 18–7 LSU
- LSU - TD-Gene Sykes recovered blocked punt in end zone (Harris kick); 25–7 LSU

Fourth quarter

No scoring

== Aftermath ==
It was the final game for both head coaches: Colorado's Sonny Grandelius was fired in March in the wake of numerous NCAA rule violations, and Paul Dietzel left for Army, then returned to LSU as athletic director in 1978.

The next season, Colorado won just two games under interim head coach Bud Davis (who later served as LSU's Chancellor), who was succeeded by Eddie Crowder in January 1963. The program's next appearance in a major bowl was after the 1976 season, also in the Orange.

LSU's next major bowl appearance was the following year, with a shutout win in the Cotton; their next Orange Bowl was in January 1971. Charles McClendon, Dietzel's top assistant, ascended to head coach and remained through the 1979 season, compiling a 137-59-7 record. McClendon remains LSU's winningest coach as of 2025.
