= Larry Grantham =

American football player (1938–2017)

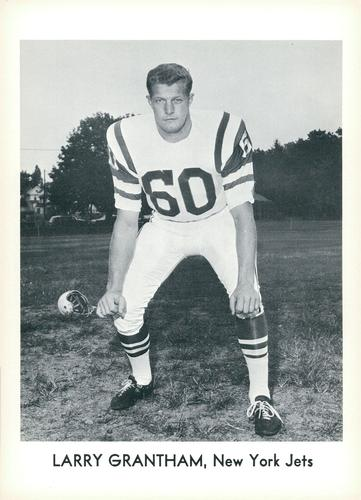
- Grantham in 1963

No. 60
- Position: Linebacker

Personal information
- Born: September 16, 1938; Crystal Springs, Mississippi, U.S.
- Died: June 17, 2017 (aged 78); Jackson, Mississippi, U.S.
- Listed height: 6 ft 0 in (1.83 m)
- Listed weight: 210 lb (95 kg)

Career information
- High school: Crystal Springs
- College: Ole Miss
- NFL draft: 1960: 15th round, 178th overall pick
- AFL draft: 1960: 2nd round

Career history

Playing
- New York Titans / Jets (1960–1972); Florida Blazers (1974)

Coaching
- San Antonio Wings (1975) Defensive coordinator

Awards and highlights
- Super Bowl champion (III); AFL champion (1968); 5× First-team All-AFL (1960–1964); 5× Second-team All-AFL (1965–1969); 5× AFL All-Star (1962–1964, 1966, 1969); AFL All-Time Team; New York Jets Ring of Honor; First-team All-SEC (1959); Second-team All-SEC (1958)

Career NFL/AFL statistics
- Interceptions: 24
- Fumble recoveries: 10
- Total touchdowns: 3
- Stats at Pro Football Reference

James Larry Grantham (September 16, 1938 – June 17, 2017) was an American professional football player who was a linebacker for the New York Titans/Jets of the American Football League (AFL) and later National Football League (NFL). He played college football for the Ole Miss Rebels. He also played pro ball for the Florida Blazers of the World Football League (WFL).

== Early life ==
Grantham was born in Crystal Springs, Mississippi. He was not initially on the radar for recruiting in football due to his size, which never got to over 195 pounds. It was an American Legion baseball game in 1956 where he played for Crystal Springs against Brookhaven that changed that idea. On a play at the plate where Brookhaven had Lance Alworth (a future star at Arkansas) on second base trying to run all the way to home on a bunt, Grantham dipped his shoulder and successfully blocked the plate. At the game that day was Tom Swayze and Buster Poole - the former was the head coach of the baseball team at the University of Mississippi and the latter was the assistant football coach. Grantham was signed to a baseball scholarship at Ole Miss and offered a tryout as a linebacker on the football team. In his sophomore year, he won a starting spot and lettered that season while also playing end on offense. His senior season was the famed 1959 squad that allowed just 21 points on defense while only losing to LSU. In the 1960 Sugar Bowl, he caught a touchdown pass, blocked a punt and had a team-leading nine tackles in the 21–0 victory over LSU as revenge for the previous 7–3 loss to them. Grantham was later named to the Ole Miss Athletic Hall of Fame.

== Pro career ==
Grantham was drafted by the American Football League's New York Titans in the 1960 college draft along with the Baltimore Colts in the eighth round in the 1960 NFL Draft. He chose to play with the Titans due to the fresh start presented by the newly formed league. He started as a wide receiver in training camp but quickly found an interest in linebacker due to his interest in hitting people. He helped form the backbone of a team (later rebranded as the New York Jets) with a defense that reached the playoffs in 1968 and 1969, and in 1968 captured the AFL Championship and the World Championship, over the NFL's Baltimore Colts. Therein Grantham's team, with him as a starter throughout, went from being the worst team in an upstart league (the AFL) to World Champions in just nine years.

From his right outside linebacker spot, Grantham wrought havoc on opposing offenses. He recorded 24 interceptions, with his most being five in 1960 and 1967. Unofficially, he also had 38.5 sacks in his career. In a ten-year span from his rookie year in 1960 to 1969, he was named an All-Pro eight times, with five of them being first-team, and he was named to the All-Star team five times. He was selected to the Second-team of the American Football League All-Time Team. In Super Bowl III, he was cited as a key part of calling defensive formations on the field in the stunning upset that the Jets would complete where they held Baltimore to no points until late in the fourth quarter of a 16–7 victory.

He is one of only twenty players to have competed in the American Football League for its entire ten-year existence, and one of only seven AFL players to have played their entire careers in one city. Grantham was also named the 1971 New York Jets MVP. Teammate Gerry Philbin, citing him as a leader, once said, "pound for pound he was the best player on the Jets.”

He played one last season in 1974 for the Florida Blazers of the start-up World Football League. The Blazers made it to World Bowl 1, losing to the Birmingham Americans.

The Professional Football Researchers Association named Grantham to the PRFA Hall of Very Good Class of 2014.

== Personal life and death ==
Grantham served as color analyst on radio broadcasts for the Jets after he retired, which lasted a year due to trouble with alcoholism, as he had been drinking on a significant basis since high school. He worked in public relations with First National Bank in Jackson, Mississippi after moving his family back to the state in 1975 and he later was a sideline commentator on Ole Miss radio broadcasts. His problems with alcohol led to a divorce in 1981 and two car accidents, with the latter seeing him charged with a DUI. He cited seeing his cellmates as an impetus to stop drinking for his grandchildren, and he soon checked into a recovery clinic. He was diagnosed with lymphoma in the late 2000s, with rising bills seeing him try to sell his Super Bowl ring to a memorabilia dealer in Las Vegas, but the dealer decided to send it back after hearing about Grantham's story. The lymphoma was treated and later went in remission. In 2011, Grantham was inducted into the Jets Ring of Honor, which he called an "unbelievable" honor.

Grantham died on June 17, 2017, at the age of 78 from complications of chronic obstructive pulmonary disease.

== See also ==
- List of American Football League players
