= 1970 South Carolina Gamecocks football team =

American college football season

1970 South Carolina Gamecocks football
- Conference: Atlantic Coast Conference
- Record: 4–6–1 (3–2–1 ACC)
- Head coach: Paul Dietzel (5th season)
- Captains: Jimmy Poston; Dave DeCamilla
- Home stadium: Carolina Stadium

1970 Atlantic Coast Conference football standings
	Conf.					Overall
Team	W		L		T	W		L		T
Wake Forest $	5	–	1	–	0	6	–	5	–	0
North Carolina	5	–	2	–	0	8	–	4	–	0
Duke	5	–	2	–	0	6	–	5	–	0
South Carolina	3	–	2	–	1	4	–	6	–	1
NC State	2	–	3	–	1	3	–	7	–	1
Clemson	2	–	4	–	0	3	–	8	–	0
Maryland	2	–	4	–	0	2	–	9	–	0
Virginia	0	–	6	–	0	5	–	6	–	0
$ – Conference champion; Rankings from AP Poll

The 1970 South Carolina Gamecocks football team represented the University of South Carolina as a member of the Atlantic Coast Conference (ACC) during the 1970 NCAA University Division football season. The team was led by fifth-year head coach Paul Dietzel and played home games at Carolina Stadium in Columbia, South Carolina.

South Carolina attempted to defend their 1969 ACC title, in their final year in the conference, but were held back by injuries. The Gamecocks compiled an overall record of 4–6–1 with a mark of 3–2–1 in conference play, placing fourth in the ACC. The victory over Clemson left senior quarterback Tommy Suggs with a 3–0 record against the Tigers, which remains the best record any Gamecock quarterback has had in the rivalry.

Athletic director and head football coach Paul Dietzel also signed the first black athlete to a football scholarship in 1970, after having mandated the recruitment of black athletes in all sports.

== Schedule ==
Date	Opponent	Rank	Site	TV	Result	Attendance	Source
September 12	at Georgia Tech*	No. 17	Grant Field; Atlanta, GA		L 20–23	51,206	
September 19	Wake Forest		Carolina Stadium; Columbia, SC		W 43–7	42,219	
September 26	at NC State		Carter Stadium; Raleigh, NC		T 7–7	25,200	
October 3	Virginia Tech*		Carolina Stadium; Columbia, SC		W 24–7	41,563	
October 10	No. 18 North Carolina		Kenan Memorial Stadium; Chapel Hill, NC (rivalry)		W 35–21	47,500	
October 17	at Maryland		Byrd Stadium; College Park, MD		L 15–21	15,400	
October 24	Florida State*		Carolina Stadium; Columbia, SC		L 13–21	42,537	
October 31	at Georgia*		Sanford Stadium; Athens, GA (rivalry)	ABC	L 34–52	57,391	
November 7	No. 8 Tennessee*		Carolina Stadium; Columbia, SC (rivalry)		L 18–20	42,788	
November 14	Duke		Carolina Stadium; Columbia, SC		L 38–42	42,454	
November 21	at Clemson		Memorial Stadium; Clemson, SC (rivalry)		W 38–32	50,949	
*Non-conference game; Rankings from AP Poll released prior to the game
