= 1970 Clemson Tigers football team =

American college football season

1970 Clemson Tigers football
- Conference: Atlantic Coast Conference
- Record: 3–8 (2–4 ACC)
- Head coach: Hootie Ingram (1st season)
- Captains: B. B. Elvington; Jim Sursavage; Ray Yauger
- Home stadium: Memorial Stadium

1970 Atlantic Coast Conference football standings
	Conf.					Overall
Team	W		L		T	W		L		T
Wake Forest $	5	–	1	–	0	6	–	5	–	0
North Carolina	5	–	2	–	0	8	–	4	–	0
Duke	5	–	2	–	0	6	–	5	–	0
South Carolina	3	–	2	–	1	4	–	6	–	1
NC State	2	–	3	–	1	3	–	7	–	1
Clemson	2	–	4	–	0	3	–	8	–	0
Maryland	2	–	4	–	0	2	–	9	–	0
Virginia	0	–	6	–	0	5	–	6	–	0
$ – Conference champion; Rankings from AP Poll

The 1970 Clemson Tigers football team was an American football team that represented Clemson University in the Atlantic Coast Conference (ACC) during the 1970 NCAA University Division football season. In its first season under head coach Hootie Ingram, the team compiled a 3–8 record (2–4 against conference opponents), tied for sixth place in the ACC, and was outscored by a total of 313 to 164. The team played its home games at Memorial Stadium in Clemson, South Carolina.

B. B. Elvington, Jim Sursavage, and Ray Yauger were the team captains. The team's statistical leaders included quarterback Tommy Kendrick with 1,407 passing yards, running back Ray Yauger with 711 rushing yards and 30 points scored (5 touchdowns), and John McMakin with 532 receiving yards.

Two Clemson players were selected by the Associated Press as first-team players on the 1970 All-Atlantic Coast Conference football team: offensive guard Dave Thompson and defensive back Don Kelley.

== Schedule ==
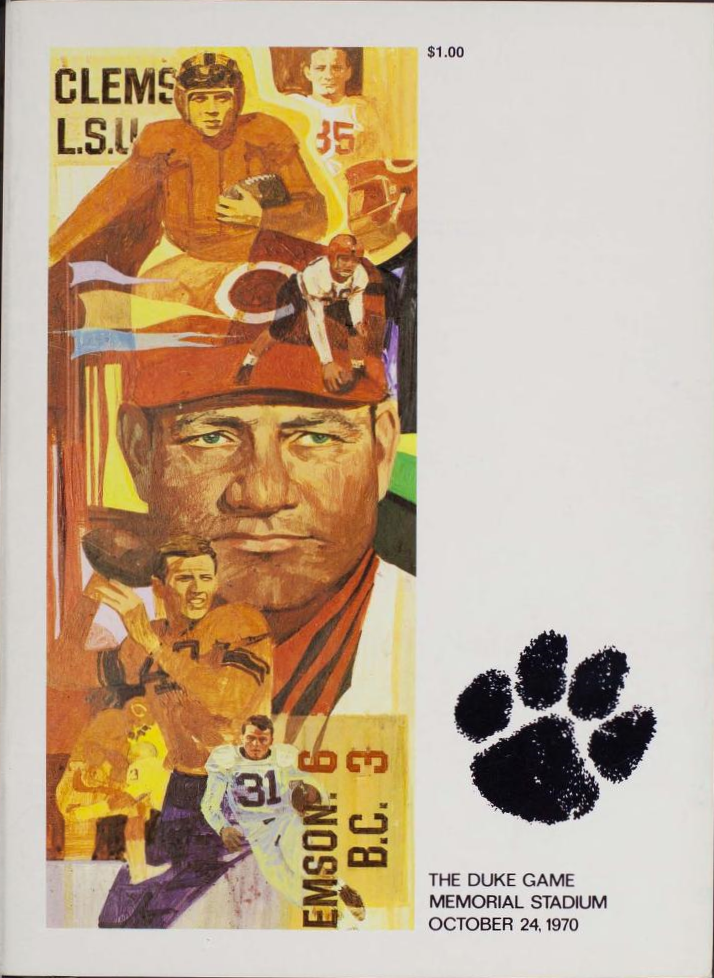
Program for the Duke game

Date	Time	Opponent	Site	Result	Attendance	Source
September 12	1:30 p.m.	The Citadel*	Memorial Stadium; Clemson, SC	W 24–0	33,908	
September 19	1:30 p.m.	Virginia	Memorial Stadium; Clemson, SC	W 27–17	29,218	
September 26	2:00 p.m.	at Georgia*	Sanford Stadium; Athens, GA (rivalry)	L 0–38	55,682	
October 3	2:00 p.m.	at No. 15 Georgia Tech*	Grant Field; Atlanta, GA (rivalry)	L 7–28	50,133	
October 10	1:30 p.m.	No. 9 Auburn*^{†}	Memorial Stadium; Clemson, SC (rivalry)	L 0–44	32,806–41,202	
October 17	1:30 p.m.	at Wake Forest	Groves Stadium; Winston-Salem, NC	L 20–36	18,500	
October 24	1:30 p.m.	Duke	Memorial Stadium; Clemson, SC	L 10–24	29,581	
October 31	1:30 p.m.	at Maryland	Byrd Stadium; College Park, MD	W 24–11	12,500	
November 7	7:30 p.m.	at Florida State*	Doak Campbell Stadium; Tallahassee, FL (rivalry)	L 13–38	25,176	
November 14	1:30 p.m.	North Carolina	Memorial Stadium; Clemson, SC	L 7–42	28,914	
November 21	1:30 p.m.	South Carolina	Memorial Stadium; Clemson, SC (rivalry)	L 32–38	50,949	
*Non-conference game; ^{†}Homecoming; Rankings from AP Poll released prior to the game; All times are in Eastern time
