= 1970 East Carolina Pirates football team =

American college football season

1970 East Carolina Pirates football
- Conference: Southern Conference
- Record: 3–8 (2–2 SoCon)
- Head coach: Mike McGee (1st season)
- Home stadium: Ficklen Memorial Stadium

1970 Southern Conference football standings
	Conf.					Overall
Team	W		L		T	W		L		T
William & Mary $	3	–	1	–	0	5	–	7	–	0
The Citadel	4	–	2	–	0	5	–	6	–	0
Furman	3	–	2	–	0	8	–	3	–	0
East Carolina	2	–	2	–	0	3	–	8	–	0
Richmond	3	–	3	–	0	4	–	6	–	0
Davidson	2	–	4	–	0	2	–	8	–	0
VMI	1	–	4	–	0	1	–	10	–	0
$ – Conference champion

The 1970 East Carolina Pirates football team was an American football team that represented East Carolina University as a member of the Southern Conference during the 1970 NCAA University Division football season. In their first season under head coach Mike McGee, the team compiled a 3–8 record. The team's game against the Marshall Thundering Herd preceded the crash of Southern Airways Flight 932, in which 37 members of the Thundering Herd football team were killed that night.

== Schedule ==
Date	Time	Opponent	Site	Result	Attendance	Source
September 12	8:00 p.m.	at Toledo*	Glass Bowl; Toledo, OH	L 2–35	14,106	
September 19		East Tennessee State*	Ficklen Memorial Stadium; Greenville, NC	L 0–10	13,042	
September 26		at The Citadel	Johnson Hagood Stadium; Charleston, SC	L 0–31	17,420	
October 3	9:00 p.m.	at West Texas State*	Buffalo Bowl; Canyon, TX	L 30–42	11,000	
October 10		at NC State*	Carter Stadium; Raleigh, NC (rivalry)	L 6–23	28,350	
October 17		Southern Illinois*	Ficklen Memorial Stadium; Greenville, NC	L 12–14	16,271	
October 24		at Richmond	City Stadium; Richmond, VA (Tobacco Bowl)	L 12–38	14,500	
October 31		at Furman	Sirrine Stadium; Greenville, SC	W 7–0	5,000	
November 7		West Virginia*	Ficklen Memorial Stadium; Greenville, NC	L 14–28	10,240	
November 14	2:05 p.m.	Marshall*	Ficklen Memorial Stadium; Greenville, NC (rivalry)	W 17–14	8,711	
November 28		at Davidson	Richardson Stadium; Davidson, NC	W 36–18	2,500	
*Non-conference game; All times are in Eastern time
