= Billy Cannon's Halloween run =

Ole Miss Rebels	LSU Tigers
(7–1)	(8–0)
3	7
Head coach: Johnny Vaught	Head coach: Paul Dietzel
AP / Coaches; 3 / 3	AP / Coaches; 1 / 1
	1	2	3	4	Total
Ole Miss	3	0	0	0	3
LSU	0	0	0	7	7
- Date: October 31, 1959
- Season: 1959
- Stadium: Tiger Stadium
- Location: Baton Rouge, Louisiana

During a college football game on Halloween night in 1959, Billy Cannon of Louisiana State University (LSU) returned a punt 89 yards for a touchdown against the Ole Miss Rebels. The return occurred late in the fourth quarter and provided the only touchdown scored in the game, as the Tigers won 7–3. Featuring several broken tackles, it was a signature play of Cannon's Heisman Trophy-winning season and a notable moment in the LSU–Ole Miss football rivalry.

== Background ==
LSU and Ole Miss had played each other regularly since 1894, and considered each other arch-rivals. Both teams were undefeated on the season coming into the game. The Tigers were the top-ranked team in the Associated Press poll and the Rebels were ranked third. Each had star players playing in their senior years: Billy Cannon for LSU and Charlie Flowers for Ole Miss. Both teams' defenses were among the best in the nation; LSU had surrendered six points combined in their first six games, while Ole Miss gave up seven points and shut-out five of the six teams they played to that point.

The game was highly anticipated, with sportswriters calling it "the game of the year." One man offered to swap 50-yard line Sugar Bowl tickets for tickets anywhere in Tiger Stadium for LSU vs. Ole Miss. Another man, perhaps jokingly, offered up his wife for tickets. One enthusiastic propagandist from the South proclaimed Ole Miss would "make LSU's Chinese Bandits look like geisha girls". On October 30, the night before the game, hundreds of LSU students surrounded the practice field where the Rebels were running drills, and taunted them with shouts of "Go to Hell, Ole Miss!"

== The game ==
Tiger Stadium was filled to capacity with 68,000 fans packing the stands. As expected, the game was a defensive struggle. The Rebels scored a field goal in the first quarter, and spent the rest of the game relying on defense and trying to pin the Tigers deep in their own territory. They punted on early downs and gambled on LSU making mistakes on offense. The gambles paid off, as the Tigers fumbled four times in the game. An interception by Cannon early in the fourth quarter caused Ole Miss coach Johnny Vaught to abandon the offensive game completely. He had his quarterback and punter, Jake Gibbs, punt on first downs. "They kept punting the ball, sticking us back in a hole," Cannon recalled, "and I thought, 'If I can get my hands on this one, I'm going to take it back.'"

=== "The run" ===
With LSU still trailing 3–0 late in the fourth quarter, on fourth-and-17 from the Ole Miss 42 yard line, Gibbs punted the ball 47 yards to the LSU 11-yard line. He intended to kick it out of bounds, as instructed by Vaught. Cannon picked up the ball after a bounce, defying coach Paul Dietzel's orders not to field punts that close to the end zone. Dietzel described his reaction to Cannon fielding the punt as "'Billy, no-no-no...' to 'Billy, go-go-go!'" He eluded and bounced off seven would-be tacklers down the east sideline, then raced the last 60 yards untouched to the end zone to give LSU a 7–3 lead.

Cannon gave his account of the run in his 2015 biography:

After I caught the ball, the first person looking me in the eye was Larry Grantham. I knew how good he was. I wanted to go to the left toward the open field, but there he was, so I cut back to the right, and he missed the tackle. I started down field, following the sideline, picking up a few blocks, and some guys missed their tackles. Finally, I broke into the open, and there was nobody left but me and Jake Gibbs. Gibbs thought I was going to the wide side of the field, so I gave him a little head fake. Now I've got to give Jake credit on this: That was the only tackle he had missed in his entire career to that point. Of course, with the team he had around him, that was the only tackle he tried to make in four years. After I had the clear sailing to the goal line, it was a question of was I going to make it, was the referee going to beat me there, or was the cameraman gaining on both of us going to outrun the whole bunch.

After the touchdown, LSU kicked off to Ole Miss, which then drove down the field to the LSU 5-yard line. After three plays Ole Miss was at the LSU 1-yard line. On fourth down and the final play of the game, LSU defensive back Warren Rabb, with an assist from Cannon, tackled Ole Miss' Doug Elmore short of the goal line as time expired to preserve the 7–3 LSU victory.

== Aftermath ==
Cannon's performance in the game was a main factor in his winning the Heisman Trophy at the end of the season. Cannon himself said, "The thing that clinched the Heisman for me was that I made a play or two in a big game." A video of the punt return is still played on the big screen in Tiger Stadium before every home game.

The teams met again at the end of the season in the 1960 Sugar Bowl. Ole Miss dominated for most of the game, as they held LSU to just 74 yards of total offense and won 21–0. The Rebels were named national champions by various selection committees. Over each of the next three seasons, the LSU vs. Ole Miss game was played with both teams ranked in the top ten and in contention for the national title. In 1960, the teams played to a 6–6 tie, which was the Rebels' only blemish in a 9–0–1 national championship season. The next season, sixth-ranked LSU defeated second-ranked and undefeated Ole Miss in Tiger Stadium, 10–7. In 1962, both teams were undefeated and ranked in the top five when the Rebels defeated the Tigers in Baton Rouge. Ole Miss finished the season undefeated and was again named national champion.

On Halloween night in 1979, exactly twenty years after Cannon's run, his son, Billy Cannon Jr. returned a punt for Broadmoor High School 89 yards for a touchdown. The return came against Istrouma High School, his father's alma mater. Cannon Jr. later played for Texas A&M and was drafted by the Dallas Cowboys in the first round of the 1984 NFL draft.

== See also ==
- Chinese Bandits
- Beast Quake
- Kick Six
- Miracle at the New Meadowlands
- Earthquake Game
- List of nicknamed college football games and plays
