= 1970 Furman Paladins football team =

American college football season

1970 Furman Paladins football
- Conference: Southern Conference
- Record: 8–3 (3–2 SoCon)
- Head coach: Bob King (13th season)
- Captains: Don Calhoun; Cleve Hightower; Byron Trotter
- Home stadium: Sirrine Stadium

1970 Southern Conference football standings
	Conf.					Overall
Team	W		L		T	W		L		T
William & Mary $	3	–	1	–	0	5	–	7	–	0
The Citadel	4	–	2	–	0	5	–	6	–	0
Furman	3	–	2	–	0	8	–	3	–	0
East Carolina	2	–	2	–	0	3	–	8	–	0
Richmond	3	–	3	–	0	4	–	6	–	0
Davidson	2	–	4	–	0	2	–	8	–	0
VMI	1	–	4	–	0	1	–	10	–	0
$ – Conference champion

The 1970 Furman Paladins football team was an American football team that represented Furman University as a member of the Southern Conference (SoCon) during the 1970 NCAA University Division football season. In their thirteenth season under head coach Bob King, Furman compiled a 8–3 record, with a mark of 3–2 in conference play, placing third in the SoCon.

== Schedule ==
Date	Opponent	Site	Result	Attendance	Source
September 12	at VMI	Alumni Memorial Field; Lexington, VA	L 0–13	5,000	
September 19	Presbyterian*	Sirrine Stadium; Greenville, SC	W 19–7	5,000	
September 26	Wofford*	Sirrine Stadium; Greenville, SC (rivalry)	L 13–28	7,000	
October 3	at Carson–Newman*	Burke–Tarr Stadium; Jefferson City, TN	W 42–34	5,000	
October 10	Richmond	Sirrine Stadium; Greenville, SC	W 23–9	4,500	
October 17	at Davidson	Richardson Stadium; Davidson, NC	W 31–24	7,400	
October 24	Chattanooga*	Sirrine Stadium; Greenville, SC	W 18–16	5,000	
October 31	East Carolina	Sirrine Stadium; Greenville, SC	L 0–7	5,000	
November 7	at Guilford*	Greensboro H.S. Stadium; Greensboro, NC	W 49–28	1,000	
November 14	The Citadel	Sirrine Stadium; Greenville, SC (rivalry)	W 28–21	5,700	
November 21	at Mississippi College*	Robinson Field; Clinton, MS	W 38–17	3,328	
*Non-conference game
