= Paul Dietzel =

American football player, coach, and administrator (1924–2013)

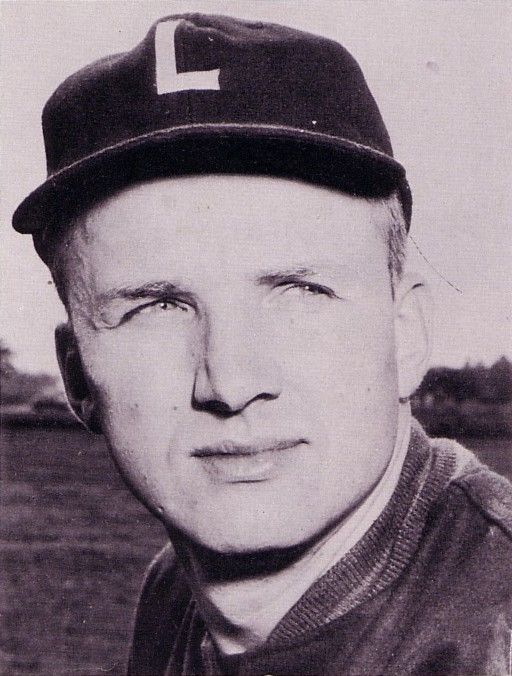

Biographical details
- Born: September 5, 1924; Fremont, Ohio, U.S.
- Died: September 24, 2013 (aged 89); Baton Rouge, Louisiana, U.S.

Playing career
- 1946–1947: Miami (OH)
- Position: Center

Coaching career (HC unless noted)
- 1948: Army (line)
- 1949–1950: Cincinnati (line)
- 1951–1952: Kentucky (line)
- 1953–1954: Army (line)
- 1955–1961: LSU
- 1962–1965: Army
- 1966–1974: South Carolina

Administrative career (AD unless noted)
- 1966–1974: South Carolina
- 1975–1978: Indiana
- 1978–1982: LSU
- 1985–1987: Samford

Head coaching record
- Overall: 109–95–5
- Bowls: 2–2

Accomplishments and honors

Championships
- 1 national (1958); 2 SEC (1958, 1961); 1 ACC (1969)

Awards
- Second-team Little All-American (1947); AFCA Coach of the Year (1958); FWAA Coach of the Year (1958); SEC Coach of the Year (1958); ACC Coach of the Year (1969)

Paul Franklin Dietzel (September 5, 1924 – September 24, 2013) was an American college football player, coach, and athletics administrator. He served as the head coach at Louisiana State University (1955–1961), the United States Military Academy (1962–1965), and the University of South Carolina (1966–1974), compiling a career head coaching record of 109–95–5. Dietzel's 1958 LSU team concluded an 11–0 season with a win over Clemson in the Sugar Bowl and was a consensus national champion. For his efforts that year, Dietzel was named the National Coach of the Year by both the American Football Coaches Association and the Football Writers Association of America. Dietzel also served as the athletic director at South Carolina (1966–1974), Indiana University Bloomington (1977–1978), LSU (1978–1982), and Samford University (1985–1987).

== Playing career ==
Dietzel began his football career in Mansfield, Ohio, where his high school team went undefeated and tied for second in the state. After high school, he was given a scholarship to play football at Duke University. After one year at Duke, he served in the U.S. Army Air Forces during World War II. From there he moved on to Miami University of Ohio, where he played center for coach Sid Gillman. He was drafted 242nd overall by the Chicago Bears in the 26th round of the 1948 NFL draft.

== Coaching career ==
After graduating from Miami in 1948, Dietzel began his coaching career as an assistant coach. He served under such legendary coaches as Red Blaik at Army and Bear Bryant at the University of Kentucky.

In 1955, Dietzel became the head coach at LSU. During Dietzel's first three years, none of his teams had a winning season.

In 1958, however, Dietzel came up with a unique three-team platoon system. It consisted of three teams of 11 different players, and was designed to keep his players from being fatigued in an era when most players started on both offense and defense. Instead of replacing individual players during the game, Dietzel would bring in an entirely new set of players between plays and series. The three teams were called the White Team (the first-string offense and defense), the Gold (Go) Team (the second-string offense), and the Chinese Bandits (the second-string defense). The system worked, as the Tigers went undefeated and won the national championship. The Chinese Bandits, the second-string defensive unit, which consisted of less-talented but ferocious players, became hugely popular with LSU fans and remains one of the most legendary pieces of LSU football history.

After 1958, Dietzel continued to have success at LSU. His teams finished with 9–1 regular seasons in 1959 and 1961, finishing No. 3 and No. 4 in the final AP Poll. The 1959 team was ranked first in the country in both wire-service polls until losing to the Tennessee Volunteers, 14–13, in the eighth game of the season. LSU concluded the season with a 21–0 loss to Ole Miss in the Sugar Bowl, two months after the top-ranked Tigers beat the third-ranked Rebels 7–3 in Tiger Stadium on Billy Cannon's 89-yard punt return, a play that helped win Cannon the Heisman Trophy.

Dietzel's final game as LSU's coach was the 1962 Orange Bowl, in which LSU defeated the Colorado Buffaloes 25–7. After the 1961 season, Dietzel accepted the head coaching job at Army. He was the first non-Army graduate to hold the position. In a 2005 article for the Concordia Sentinel of Ferriday, Louisiana, Dietzel said that leaving LSU was one of the hardest decisions he ever made. However, he was not able to match the success he had at LSU, compiling a record of 21–18–1 at Army.

Dietzel stayed at Army until 1966, when he became head coach and athletic director at the University of South Carolina. Despite coaching South Carolina to the school's only conference championship in football, the Atlantic Coast Conference title in 1969, Dietzel's overall record was only of 42–53–1. In 1974, amid intense fan pressure, Dietzel announced that he would resign at the end of the season, following an upset loss to Duke as the Gamecocks fell to 0–2.

== Athletic administration career ==
As the South Carolina athletic director, Dietzel greatly improved the athletic facilities. During his tenure, Carolina Stadium, renamed Williams-Brice Stadium in 1972, grew from 42,000 seats at his arrival to 54,000 seats at his retirement.

He oversaw South Carolina's withdrawal from the Atlantic Coast Conference in 1971. Dietzel felt that the ACC's higher academic entrance requirements were preventing the South Carolina football program from signing talented players which could propel the program to national prominence. Dietzel has one other lasting legacy at South Carolina. During the first game of the 1968 season, Dietzel heard the school's band play an arrangement of the Broadway show tune "Step to the Rear" from How Now, Dow Jones. Dietzel liked it so much that he decided it should be the school's new fight song, and proceeded to write a new set of lyrics to the tune. Later that season, the song, with Dietzel's lyrics, made its debut as "The Fighting Gamecocks Lead the Way", which has been Carolina's fight song ever since. Dietzel also designed the Fighting Gamecock logo which is still in use today.

Dietzel left coaching in 1975 to become the commissioner of the Ohio Valley Conference for one year. He then served as athletic director at Indiana University before returning to LSU in 1978. He was the school's athletic director from 1978 to 1982.

During Dietzel's second tenure in Baton Rouge, the men's basketball team won the 1978-79 SEC championship and reached the Final Four in 1981 under Dale Brown, who was hired by Dietzel's predecessor, Carl Maddox, in 1972. On the football field, Dietzel ushered his former assistant coach and successor, Charles McClendon, into retirement after 18 seasons at the helm, hiring Bo Rein as McClendon's successor, then turning to former LSU All-American Jerry Stovall when Rein perished in a plane crash on January 10, 1980.

Dietzel was fired on February 5, 1982 after it was revealed the LSU athletic department ran a $390,000 deficit during the 1980-81 school year, and the deficit would balloon into the millions over the next several years if severe corrective action was not taken.

Dietzel also served as president of the American Football Coaches Association and the Fellowship of Christian Athletes. Dietzel came out of retirement in 1983 to become Athletics Director at Samford University. He resigned in 1985 following the dismissal of Head Football Coach Kim Alsop over his objections.

== Later life ==
After retiring from college athletics, Dietzel became a watercolor painter. He lived in Baton Rouge, Louisiana, with his wife, Anne, until his death.

In 2005, Dietzel, along with timber industrialist Roy O. Martin, Jr., the civil rights pioneer Andrew Young, country music artist Kix Brooks, and the LSU woman's basketball coach Sue Gunter were named a "Louisiana Legend" by Louisiana Public Broadcasting.

Dietzel authored a book, Call Me Coach: A Life in College Football, that was published in September 2008 by the Louisiana State University Press.

He died on September 24, 2013, nineteen days after his 89th birthday.

His namesake grandson, Paul Dietzel, II, of Baton Rouge was a Republican candidate for the open seat from Louisiana's 6th congressional district in the nonpartisan blanket primary held on November 4, 2014.

== Head coaching record ==
Year	Team	Overall	Conference	Standing	Bowl/playoffs	Coaches^{#}	AP^{°}
LSU Tigers (Southeastern Conference) (1955–1961)
1955	LSU	3–5–2	2–3–1	9th			
1956	LSU	3–7	1–5	11th			
1957	LSU	5–5	4–4	7th			
1958	LSU	11–0	6–0	1st	W Sugar	1	1
1959	LSU	9–2	5–1	T–2nd	L Sugar	3	3
1960	LSU	5–4–1	2–3–1	8th			
1961	LSU	10–1	6–0	T–1st	W Orange	3	4
LSU:		46–24–3	26–16–2				
Army Cadets (NCAA University Division independent) (1962–1965)
1962	Army	6–4					
1963	Army	7–3					
1964	Army	4–6					
1965	Army	4–5–1					
Army:		21–18–1					
South Carolina Gamecocks (Atlantic Coast Conference) (1966–1970)
1966	South Carolina	1–9	1–3	7th			
1967	South Carolina	5–5	4–2	3rd			
1968	South Carolina	4–6	4–3	4th			
1969	South Carolina	7–4	6–0	1st	L Peach		
1970	South Carolina	4–6–1	3–2–1	4th			
South Carolina Gamecocks (NCAA University Division / Division I independent) (1971–1974)
1971	South Carolina	6–5					
1972	South Carolina	4–7					
1973	South Carolina	7–4					
1974	South Carolina	4–7					
South Carolina:		42–53–1	18–10–1				
Total:		109–95–5					
National championship Conference title Conference division title or championship game berth
^{#}Rankings from final Coaches Poll.; ^{°}Rankings from final AP Poll.

== See also ==
- List of presidents of the American Football Coaches Association
