= 1960 Sugar Bowl =

American college football game

- 26th Sugar Bowl
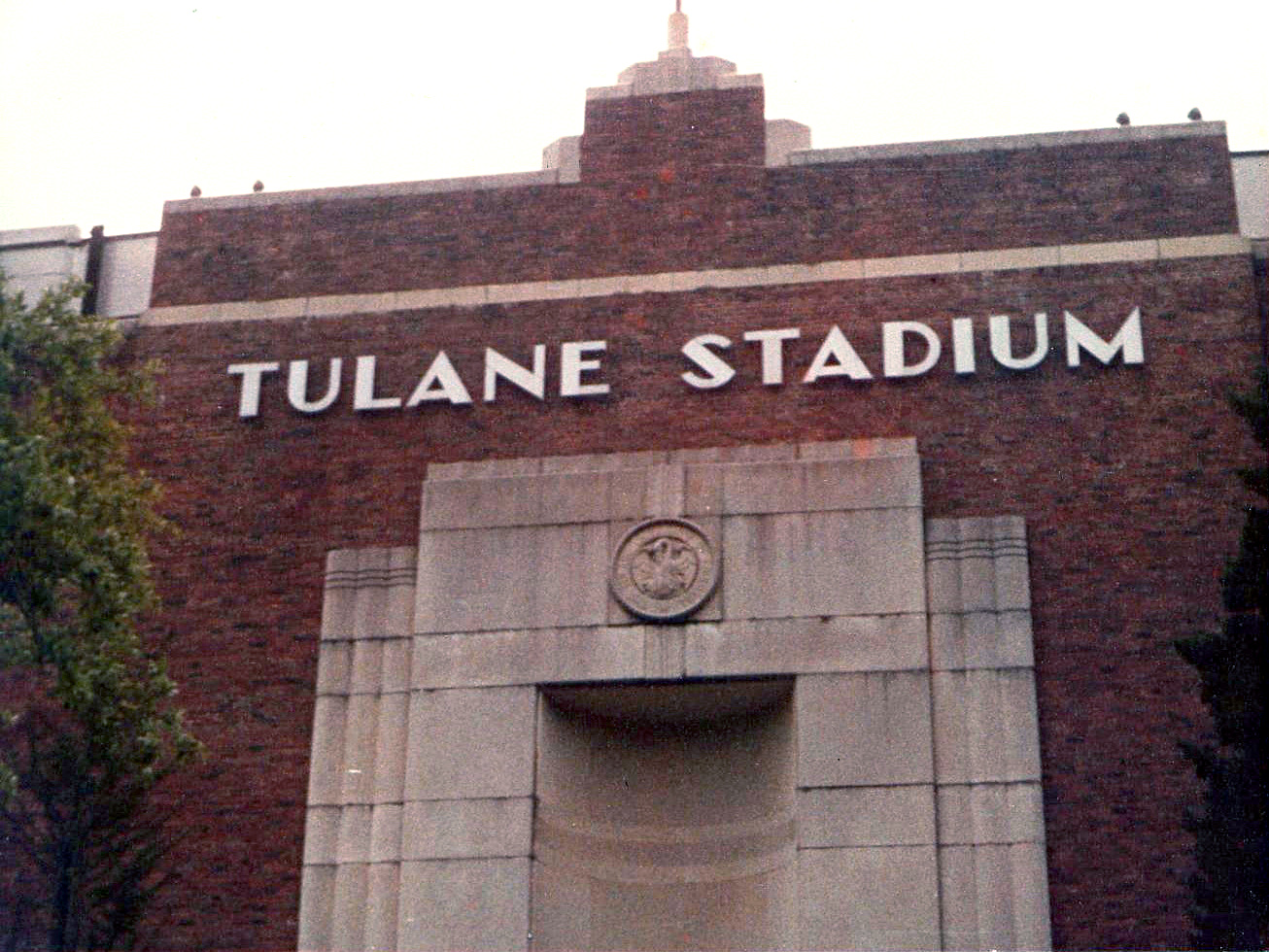
- Tulane Stadium in New Orleans, Louisiana, hosted the Sugar Bowl.
Ole Miss Rebels	LSU Tigers
(9–1)	(9–1)
SEC	SEC
21	0
Head coach: Johnny Vaught	Head coach: Paul Dietzel
AP / Coaches; 2 / 2	AP / Coaches; 3 / 3
	1	2	3	4	Total
Ole Miss	0	7	7	7	21
LSU	0	0	0	0	0
- Date: January 1, 1960
- Season: 1959
- Stadium: Tulane Stadium
- Location: New Orleans, Louisiana
- Referee: E.D. Cavette (SEC)
- Attendance: 81,141

United States TV coverage
- Network: NBC

The 1960 Sugar Bowl featured the second-ranked Ole Miss Rebels, and the third ranked LSU Tigers. LSU was the defending national champion, playing in its home state, but faced a rematch of a tough 7–3 win in a regular season game.

After a scoreless first quarter of play, Ole Miss scored on a 43-yard touchdown pass from quarterback Jake Gibbs to Cowboy Woodruff, as the Rebels took a 7–0 lead. In the third quarter, Bobby Franklin of Ole Miss threw an 18-yard touchdown pass to Larry Grantham as Ole Miss led 14–0. In the fourth quarter, Franklin threw a 9-yard touchdown pass to George Blair as Ole Miss led 21–0. They held on to win the game.

The story of the game was Ole Miss's relentless defense, that may have been one of the best in any bowl game's history. It held LSU to just 74 yards of total offense, including negative 15 rushing yards, and never let LSU inside the Ole Miss 38-yard line during the game. Bobby Franklin was named the game's MVP.

== See also ==
- List of college football post-season games that were rematches of regular season games
- Magnolia Bowl
