= 1959–60 NCAA football bowl games =

College football postseason game series

- Season: 1959
- Number of bowls: 9
- All-star games: Blue–Gray Football Classic; East–West Shrine Game; North–South Shrine Game; Senior Bowl
- Bowl games: December 19, 1959 – January 2, 1960 (Note: Excludes all-star games.)
- Champions: Syracuse (AP, Coaches, FWAA, NFF)
Bowl record by conference
| Conference | Bowls | Record | Number of teams in final AP poll |
| SEC | 5 | 2–3 (0.400) | 5 |
| SWC | 3 | 1–2 (0.333) | 3 |
| Independents | 2 | 2–0 (1.000) | 4 |
| AAWU | 1 | 1–0 (1.000) | 2 |
| ACC | 1 | 1–0 (1.000) | 1 |
| Border | 1 | 1–0 (1.000) | 0 |
| OVC | 1 | 1–0 (1.000) | 0 |
| Big Seven | 1 | 0–1 (0.000) | 2 |
| Big Ten | 1 | 0–1 (0.000) | 2 |
| Little Three | 1 | 0–1 (0.000) | 0 |
| MVC | 1 | 0–1 (0.000) | 0 |
| Skyline | 0 | 0–0 (–) | 1 |

The 1959–60 NCAA football bowl games were a series of post-season games played in December 1959 and January 1960 to end the 1959 college football season. A total of nine team-competitive games, and four all-star games, were played. The post-season began on December 19 with the Bluebonnet Bowl and Liberty Bowl, and concluded on January 9, 1960, with the season-ending Senior Bowl all-star game.

== Schedule ==
The following table lists bowl games involving University Division teams; (Note: Teams in this seasons's Tangerine Bowl were not from the University Division, but the bowl is included due to its history with such teams.) bowl games at lower levels are listed in the See also section.

The nine team-competitive bowls consisted of seven played the prior season (the eighth, the Bluegrass Bowl, did not return) plus the first editions of the Bluebonnet Bowl and Liberty Bowl.

| Date | Game | Site | Time (US EST) | TV | Matchup (pre-game record) | AP pre-game rank | UPI (Coaches) pre-game rank |
|---|---|---|---|---|---|---|---|
| 12/19 | Liberty Bowl | Philadelphia Municipal Stadium; Philadelphia, Pennsylvania | 1:00 p.m. | NBC | Penn State 7 (8–2) (Independent); Alabama 0 (7–1–2) (SEC) | #12 #10 | #10 #13 |
| 12/19 | Bluebonnet Bowl | Rice Stadium; Houston, Texas | 3:30 p.m. | CBS | Clemson 23 (8–2) (ACC); TCU 7 (8–2) (SWC) | #11 #7 | #11 #8 |
| 12/31 | Sun Bowl | Kidd Field; El Paso, Texas | 4:00 p.m. | — | New Mexico State 28 (7–3) (Border); North Texas State 8 (9–1) (MVC) | NR; NR | NR; NR |
| 1/1 | Orange Bowl | Burdine Stadium; Miami, Florida | 1:00 p.m. | CBS | Georgia 14 (9–1) (SEC); Missouri 0 (6–4) (Big Seven) | #5 #18 | #5 #20 |
| 1/1 | Sugar Bowl | Tulane Stadium; New Orleans, Louisiana | 2:00 p.m. | NBC | Ole Miss 21 (9–1) (SEC); LSU 0 (9–1) (SEC) | #2 #3 | #2 #3 |
| 1/1 | Cotton Bowl Classic | Cotton Bowl; Dallas, Texas | 3:30 p.m. | CBS | Syracuse 23 (10–0) (Independent); Texas 14 (9–1) (SWC) | #1 #4 | #1 #4 |
| 1/1 | Rose Bowl | Rose Bowl; Pasadena, California | 5:00 p.m. | NBC | Washington 44 (9–1) (AAWU); Wisconsin 8 (7–2) (Big Ten) | #8 #6 | #7 #6 |
| 1/1 | Tangerine Bowl | Tangerine Bowl (stadium); Orlando, Florida | 8:15 p.m. | — | Middle Tennessee 21 (9–0–1) (OVC); Presbyterian 12 (9–1) (Little Three) | n/a | n/a |
| 1/2 | Gator Bowl | Gator Bowl Stadium; Jacksonville, Florida | 2:00 p.m. | CBS | Arkansas 14 (8–2) (SWC); Georgia Tech 7 (6–4) (SEC) | #9; NR | #9; NR |

== See also ==
- Holiday Bowl (NAIA)
- Prairie View Bowl
