= Gator Bowl =

Annual American college football postseason game

- TaxSlayer Gator Bowl
- Stadium: EverBank Stadium
- Location: Jacksonville, Florida
- Previous stadiums: Gator Bowl Stadium (1946–1993)
- Temporary venue: Ben Hill Griffin Stadium, Gainesville, Florida (1994)
- Operated: 1946–present
- Championship affiliation: Bowl Coalition (1992–1994)
- Conference tie-ins: ACC (1996–2010, 2016–present); SEC (1953–1975, 1992–1994, 2011–present)
- Previous conference tie-ins: Southern (1946–1952); Big East (1996–2010); Big 12 (2006–2010); Big Ten (2011–2021)
- Payout: US$5.35 million (2019 season)
- Website: taxslayergatorbowl.com

Sponsors
- Mazda (1986–1991); Outback Steakhouse (1992–1994); Toyota (1995–2007); Konica Minolta (2008–2010); Progressive Insurance (2011); TaxSlayer.com (2012–present)

Former names
- Gator Bowl (1946–1985); Mazda Gator Bowl (1986–1991); Outback Gator Bowl (1992–1994); Toyota Gator Bowl (1995–2007); Konica Minolta Gator Bowl (2008–2010); Progressive Gator Bowl (2011); TaxSlayer.com Gator Bowl (2012–2013); TaxSlayer Bowl (2014–2017)

2025 matchup
- Missouri vs. Virginia (Virginia 13–7)

The Gator Bowl is an annual college football bowl game held in Jacksonville, Florida, usually contested on or around New Year's Day. It has been held continuously since 1946, making it the sixth oldest college bowl, as well as the first televised nationally. The game was originally played at Gator Bowl Stadium through the December 1993 game. The December 1994 game was played at Ben Hill Griffin Stadium in Gainesville after the namesake stadium was demolished to make way for a replacement venue, Jacksonville Municipal Stadium. That venue, now known as EverBank Stadium, has been home to the Gator Bowl since the January 1996 game.

The game is operated by Gator Bowl Sports and has been sponsored by TaxSlayer.com since 2012, and starting with the 2018 edition is officially known as the TaxSlayer Gator Bowl. From 2015 to 2017, it was officially referred to as simply the TaxSlayer Bowl. Previous sponsors include Progressive Insurance (2011), Konica Minolta (2008–2010), Toyota (1995–2007), Outback Steakhouse (1992–1994), and Mazda (1986–1991).

== History ==
According to writer Anthony C. DiMarco, Charles Hilty Sr. first conceived of the event. Hilty, together with Ray McCarthy, Maurice Cherry, and W. C. Ivey, put up $10,000 to underwrite the first game, which was held at Jacksonville's football stadium, Fairfield Stadium, on January 1, 1946.

The first two years of the event did not sell out the small capacity stadium, drawing only 7,362 to the 1946 game when the Wake Forest Demon Deacons defeated the South Carolina Gamecocks, 26–14. The stadium was expanded in 1948 and renamed the Gator Bowl Stadium in honor of the event. However, it was not until the 1949 matchup between the Clemson Tigers and the Missouri Tigers that the future of the Gator Bowl was assured: the 1948 attendance of 16,666 for a 20–20 tie between Maryland and Georgia was nearly doubled with 32,939 watching Clemson squeak by Missouri, 24–23, on a late field goal by Jack Miller.

By the 1970s, the attendance regularly reached 60,000–70,000.

=== Hotel Roosevelt fire in 1963 ===
The Gator Bowl is one of Jacksonville's annual sports highlights. However, the event was once associated with a tragedy. In the early morning of December 29, 1963, the Hotel Roosevelt in downtown Jacksonville caught fire after a post-Gator Bowl party in the ballroom. It was later determined that the party was not the cause of the fire, and that the timing was a coincidence. The fire resulted in 22 deaths.

=== Woody Hayes incident in 1978 ===
In the 1978 game between Ohio State and Clemson, Ohio State coach Woody Hayes lost his temper after a late game interception by Clemson nose guard Charlie Bauman, who stepped in front of the receiver on a pass from quarterback Art Schlichter. Bauman ran the ball out of bounds on the Ohio State sideline where Hayes struck Bauman with his right forearm. The play sealed the Tigers' 17–15 win over the Buckeyes, while Hayes was fired the next day before leaving Jacksonville.

=== Bowden's Last Stand in 2010 ===
In the 2010 game between Florida State and West Virginia, Florida State coach Bobby Bowden (who previously coached at West Virginia) coached the final game of his career. Bowden had been the head coach at Florida State since 1976 and had won two national championships, 13 ACC championships, and had a 14-year streak of top five finishes during that time. A record crowd of over 84,000 people witnessed Bowden being carried off the field after a 33–21 Florida State victory.

=== TaxSlayer sponsorship ===
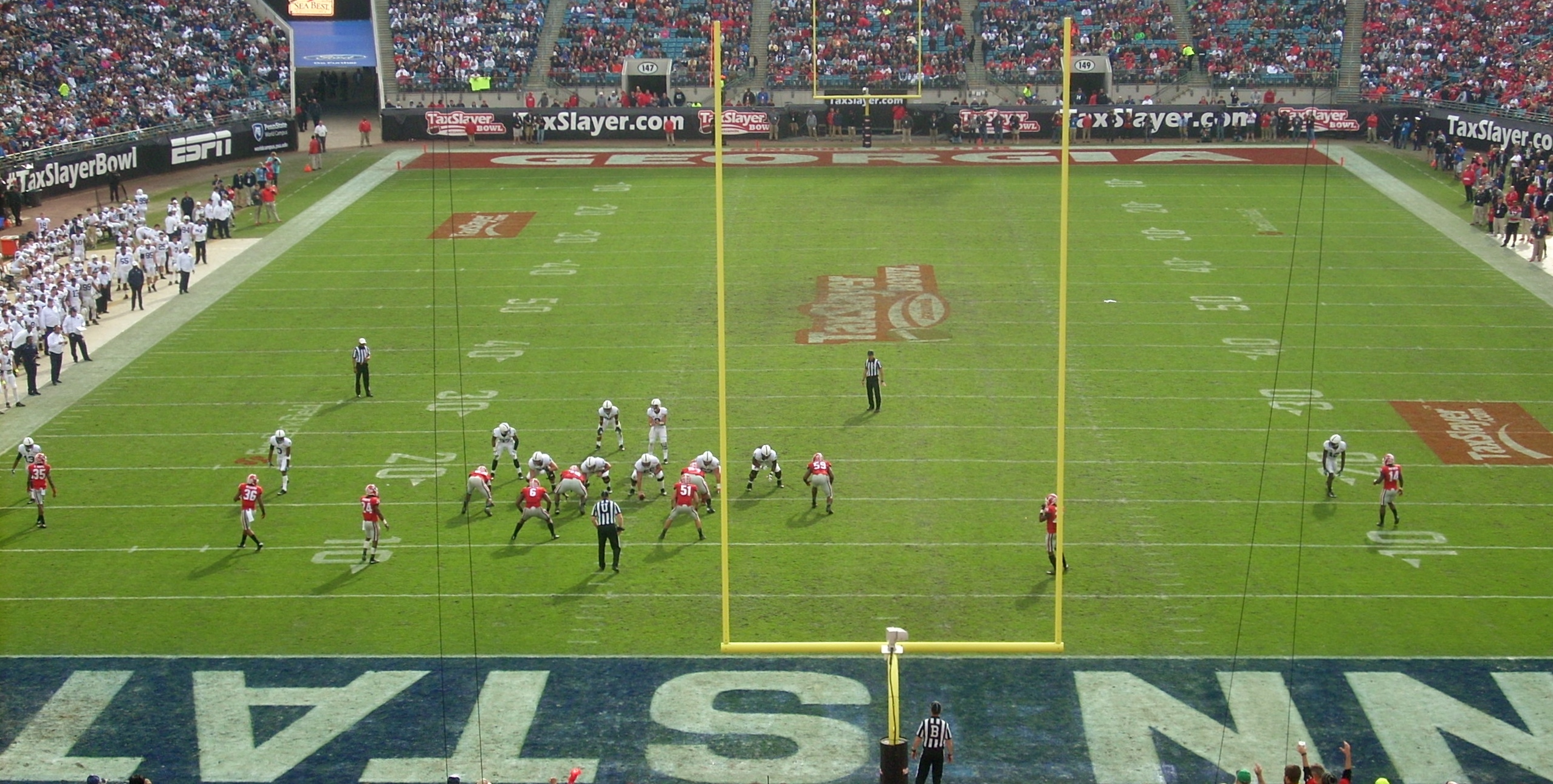
The 2016 TaxSlayer Bowl featuring the Penn State Nittany Lions and the Georgia Bulldogs

In 2014, Gator Bowl Sports announced the bowl would be renamed the TaxSlayer Bowl following a new six-year deal with tax preparation company TaxSlayer.com. As a result of the deal, the bowl increased its payout and moved to a new time slot on January 2 for 2015 and 2016. A new logo was released on April 3, 2014. For the December 2018 contest, "Gator" was reinstated in the name for the first time since 2015, with the bowl being called the TaxSlayer Gator Bowl.

== Venues ==
The 1946 and 1947 games were played in Fairfield Stadium, which had a seating capacity of 7,600. The stadium was expanded to 16,000 seats in 1948, and the structure was renamed the Gator Bowl. Prior to the 1949 game, the seating capacity was expanded to 36,058, at which it remained until 1957. That stadium hosted the game through 1993, when it was almost completely demolished for the construction of Jacksonville Municipal Stadium on the same site. During construction, the December 1994 game was played at Ben Hill Griffin Stadium in Gainesville, Florida. The January 1996 game, and all subsequent games to date, have been held at Jacksonville Municipal Stadium, currently known as EverBank Stadium.

== Organization ==
The game and associated activities are overseen by Gator Bowl Sports. Founded as the Gator Bowl Association in 1945, the organization expanded in 2013 to branch into other sports and events and increase its charity wing.

The association comprises 225 Gator Bowl Committee members, 84 Chairman's Club members and sponsors, more than 700 volunteers, plus over a dozen paid staff members. In addition to the Gator Bowl, the GBA has also coordinated other events. It hosted the ACC Championship Game from 2005 to 2007 and the River City Showdown, a neutral site game between the Florida State Seminoles and another team, in 2007 and 2008.

== Teams typically featured ==
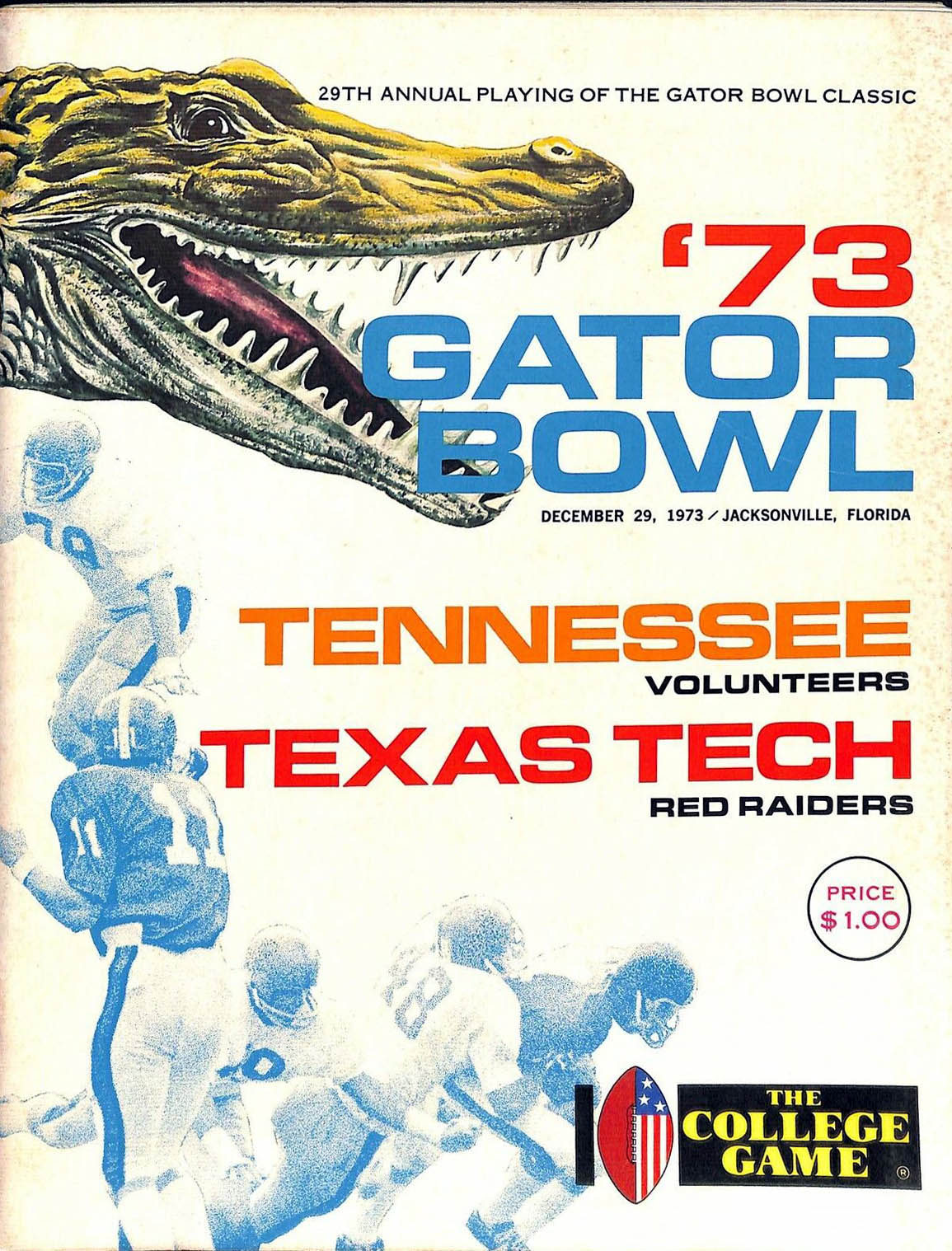
Cover of the 1973 Gator Bowl game program

In the early years of the bowl, from 1946–1952, it featured a team from the Southern Conference against an at-large opponent. Beginning with the 1953 game, it switched to generally featuring a Southeastern Conference (SEC) team against an at-large opponent. From 1953 to the 1975 game, at least one SEC team appeared in 20 out of the 24 games, and in three of those games both teams were from the SEC. The games from 1976 to 1995 usually, but not always, involved a team from the southeastern United States against a team from another part of the country. Teams from the Atlantic Coast Conference (ACC) played in ten of these 20 games.

From 1996–2006, the Gator Bowl traditionally hosted the second-place ACC team against the second-place Big East Conference team. With the 2007 game, the ACC runner-up became contractually tied to play in the Chick-fil-A Bowl and the Gator Bowl began hosting the third-place ACC team versus a team from either the Big East (still the conference's #2 team unless they qualified for the Bowl Championship Series), the Big 12 Conference, or the unaffiliated Notre Dame Fighting Irish (who would take the Big East's spot in this game). The contract, which ran for four years, was held in conjunction with the Sun Bowl, with the Gator Bowl receiving first choice of teams, and required both bowls to take Big East teams twice and Big 12 teams twice. Since the previous two Gator Bowls featured the Texas Tech Red Raiders and the Nebraska Cornhuskers, both Big 12 teams, a Big East team or Notre Dame would play in the 2010 Gator Bowl per the terms of the contract (West Virginia lost to Florida State in this game).

The conference alignment changed again in 2010, as the Big East and Notre Dame moved their hybrid arrangement to the Champs Sports Bowl for 2010, while the Gator Bowl declined to renew its contract with the Big 12. The Gator Bowl would feature the SEC and the Big Ten Conference starting with the 2010 season, joining the Capital One Bowl and the Outback Bowl as the third Big Ten-SEC bowl matchup on New Year's Day. Starting in 2015, the bowl returned to a hybrid arrangement for a six-year period, with SEC teams playing ACC teams for three years and Big Ten teams the other three years; the Notre Dame Fighting Irish are also eligible during ACC years.

Through 74 playings (the 2018 edition), 38 have been contested with both teams ranked (per the AP Poll), most recently the 2006 edition. The highest ranked team to appear was No. 3 Pittsburgh in the 1980 edition.

== Title sponsors ==
Mazda was the first title sponsor, beginning in 1986 and lasting for five years. Outback Steakhouse sponsored the Gator Bowl for three years beginning in 1992, prior to obtaining their own Outback Bowl held in Tampa, Florida. From 1996–2006, the title sponsor was Toyota. Konica Minolta then became the sponsor from 2007 to 2010. On December 14, 2010, the Gator Bowl Association announced that Progressive Insurance would become the title sponsor for the 2011 Gator Bowl. On September 1, 2011, GBA announced a multi-year title sponsorship deal with TaxSlayer.com.

== Game results ==
All rankings are taken from the AP poll prior to the game being played. Italics denote a tie game.

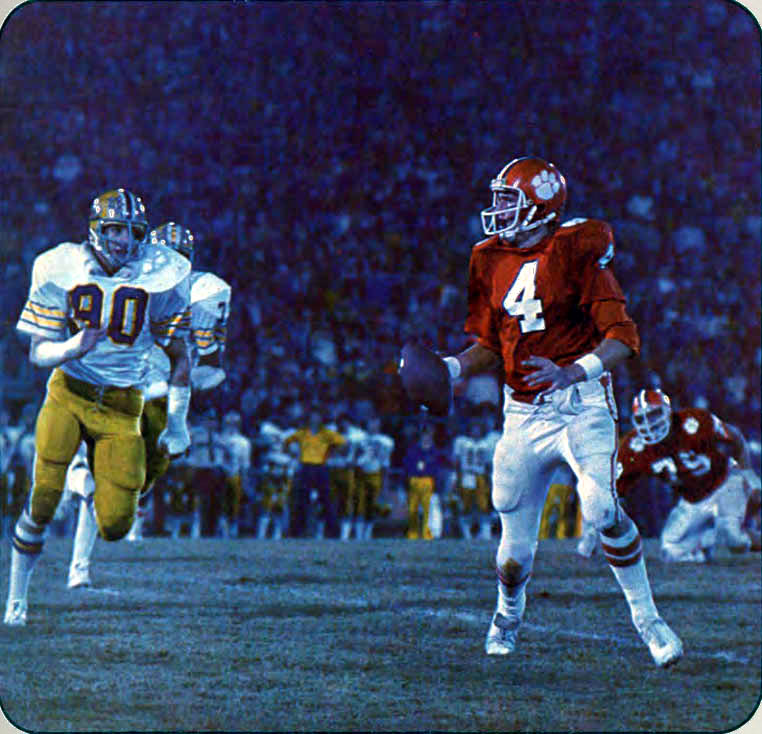
Clemson v Pitt, 1977 edition

Date played	Bowl name	Winning team		Losing team		Attnd.
January 1, 1946	Gator Bowl	#19 Wake Forest	26	South Carolina	14	7,362
January 1, 1947	Gator Bowl	#14 Oklahoma	34	#18 NC State	13	10,134
January 1, 1948	Gator Bowl (Note: Venue was renamed Gator Bowl in 1948.)	Georgia	20	Maryland	20	16,666
January 1, 1949	Gator Bowl	#11 Clemson	24	Missouri	23	35,273
January 2, 1950	Gator Bowl	#14 Maryland	20	#20 Missouri	7	18,409
January 1, 1951	Gator Bowl	#12 Wyoming	20	#18 Washington & Lee	7	26,354
January 1, 1952	Gator Bowl	Miami (Florida)	14	#19 Clemson	0	37,208
January 1, 1953	Gator Bowl	#15 Florida	14	#12 Tulsa	13	30,015
January 1, 1954	Gator Bowl	#12 Texas Tech	35	#17 Auburn	13	28,641
December 31, 1954	Gator Bowl	#13 Auburn	33	#18 Baylor	13	34,408
December 31, 1955	Gator Bowl	#8 Vanderbilt	25	Auburn	13	32,174
December 29, 1956	Gator Bowl	#4 Georgia Tech	21	#13 Pittsburgh	14	37,683
December 28, 1957	Gator Bowl	#13 Tennessee	3	#9 Texas A&M	0	41,160
December 27, 1958	Gator Bowl	#11 Ole Miss	7	#14 Florida	3	41,312
January 2, 1960	Gator Bowl	#9 Arkansas	14	Georgia Tech	7	45,104
December 31, 1960	Gator Bowl	#18 Florida	13	#12 Baylor	12	50,122
December 30, 1961	Gator Bowl	#17 Penn State	30	#13 Georgia Tech	15	50,202
December 29, 1962	Gator Bowl	Florida	17	#9 Penn State	7	50,026
December 28, 1963	Gator Bowl	North Carolina	35	Air Force	0	50,018
January 2, 1965	Gator Bowl	Florida State	36	Oklahoma	19	50,408
December 31, 1965	Gator Bowl	Georgia Tech	31	#10 Texas Tech	21	60,127
December 31, 1966	Gator Bowl	Tennessee	18	Syracuse	12	60,312
December 30, 1967	Gator Bowl	#10 Penn State	17	Florida State	17	68,019
December 28, 1968	Gator Bowl	#16 Missouri	35	#12 Alabama	10	68,011
December 27, 1969	Gator Bowl	#15 Florida	14	#11 Tennessee	13	72,248
January 2, 1971	Gator Bowl	#10 Auburn	35	Ole Miss	28	71,136
December 31, 1971	Gator Bowl	#6 Georgia	7	North Carolina	3	71,208
December 30, 1972	Gator Bowl	#6 Auburn	24	#13 Colorado	3	71,114
December 29, 1973	Gator Bowl	#11 Texas Tech	28	#20 Tennessee	19	62,109
December 30, 1974	Gator Bowl	#6 Auburn	27	#11 Texas	3	63,811
December 29, 1975	Gator Bowl	#17 Maryland	13	#13 Florida	0	64,012
December 27, 1976	Gator Bowl	#15 Notre Dame	20	#20 Penn State	9	67,827
December 30, 1977	Gator Bowl	#10 Pittsburgh	34	#11 Clemson	3	72,289
December 29, 1978	Gator Bowl	#7 Clemson	17	#20 Ohio State	15	72,011
December 28, 1979	Gator Bowl	North Carolina	17	#14 Michigan	15	70,407
December 29, 1980	Gator Bowl	#3 Pittsburgh	37	#18 South Carolina	9	72,297
December 28, 1981	Gator Bowl	#11 North Carolina	31	Arkansas	27	71,009
December 30, 1982	Gator Bowl	Florida State	31	#10 West Virginia	12	80,913
December 30, 1983	Gator Bowl	#11 Florida	14	#10 Iowa	6	81,293
December 28, 1984	Gator Bowl	#9 Oklahoma State	21	#7 South Carolina	14	82,138
December 30, 1985	Gator Bowl	#18 Florida State	34	#19 Oklahoma State	23	79,417
December 27, 1986	Gator Bowl	Clemson	27	#20 Stanford	21	80,104
December 31, 1987	Gator Bowl	#7 LSU	30	#9 South Carolina	13	82,119
January 1, 1989	Gator Bowl	#19 Georgia	34	Michigan State	27	76,236
December 30, 1989	Gator Bowl	#14 Clemson	27	#17 West Virginia	7	82,911
January 1, 1991	Gator Bowl	#12 Michigan	35	#15 Ole Miss	3	68,297
December 29, 1991	Gator Bowl	#20 Oklahoma	48	#19 Virginia	14	62,003
December 31, 1992	Gator Bowl	#14 Florida	27	#12 NC State	10	71,233
December 31, 1993	Gator Bowl	#18 Alabama	24	#12 North Carolina	10	67,205
December 30, 1994	Gator Bowl (Note: The December 1994 game was held at Ben Hill Griffin Stadium on the campus of the University of Florida in Gainesville due to renovations.)	Tennessee	45	#17 Virginia Tech	23	62,200
January 1, 1996	Gator Bowl (Note: The January 1996 game was the first to be held at Jacksonville Municipal Stadium.)	Syracuse	41	#23 Clemson	0	45,202
January 1, 1997	Gator Bowl	#12 North Carolina	20	#25 West Virginia	13	52,103
January 1, 1998	Gator Bowl	#7 North Carolina	42	Virginia Tech	3	54,116
January 1, 1999	Gator Bowl	#12 Georgia Tech	35	#17 Notre Dame	28	70,791
January 1, 2000	Gator Bowl	#23 Miami (Florida)	28	#17 Georgia Tech	13	43,416
January 1, 2001	Gator Bowl	#6 Virginia Tech	41	#16 Clemson	20	68,741
January 1, 2002	Gator Bowl	#24 Florida State	30	#15 Virginia Tech	17	72,202
January 1, 2003	Gator Bowl	#17 NC State	28	#11 Notre Dame	6	73,491
January 1, 2004	Gator Bowl	#23 Maryland	41	#20 West Virginia	7	78,891
January 1, 2005	Gator Bowl	#17 Florida State	30	West Virginia	18	70,112
January 2, 2006	Gator Bowl	#12 Virginia Tech	35	#15 Louisville	24	63,780
January 1, 2007	Gator Bowl	#13 West Virginia	38	Georgia Tech	35	67,714
January 1, 2008	Gator Bowl	Texas Tech	31	#21 Virginia	28	60,243
January 1, 2009	Gator Bowl	Nebraska	26	Clemson	21	67,232
January 1, 2010	Gator Bowl	Florida State	33	#18 West Virginia	21	84,129
January 1, 2011	Gator Bowl	#21 Mississippi State	52	Michigan	14	68,325
January 2, 2012	Gator Bowl	Florida	24	Ohio State	17	61,312
January 1, 2013	Gator Bowl	#21 Northwestern	34	Mississippi State	20	48,612
January 1, 2014	Gator Bowl	Nebraska	24	#22 Georgia	19	60,712
January 2, 2015	TaxSlayer Bowl	Tennessee	45	Iowa	28	56,310
January 2, 2016	TaxSlayer Bowl	Georgia	24	Penn State	17	58,212
December 31, 2016	TaxSlayer Bowl	Georgia Tech	33	Kentucky	18	43,102
December 30, 2017	TaxSlayer Bowl	#24 Mississippi State	31	Louisville	27	41,310
December 31, 2018	Gator Bowl	#21 Texas A&M	52	NC State	13	38,206
January 2, 2020	Gator Bowl	Tennessee†	23	Indiana	22	61,789
January 2, 2021	Gator Bowl	Kentucky	23	#24 NC State	21	10,422
December 31, 2021	Gator Bowl	#20 Wake Forest	38	Rutgers	10	28,508
December 30, 2022	Gator Bowl	#19 Notre Dame	45	#20 South Carolina	38	67,383
December 29, 2023	Gator Bowl	Clemson	38	Kentucky	35	40,132
January 2, 2025	Gator Bowl	#16 Ole Miss	52	Duke	20	31,290
December 27, 2025	Gator Bowl	#20 Virginia	13	#25 Missouri	7	31,802

† Tennessee's win the January 2020 edition was vacated by the NCAA in July 2023.

== MVPs ==
From 1946 through 1952, an overall game MVP was named. From 1953 through 2021, MVPs were named for each team; in several instances, co-MVPs were named. Since the 2022 edition, the bowl has again named an overall game MVP; the honor was shared in the December 2023 game.

Most Valuable Players
Date Played	MVP	Team	Position				Ref
January 1, 1946	Nick Sacrinty	Wake Forest	QB				
January 1, 1947	Joe Golding	Oklahoma	HB				
January 1, 1948	Lu Gambino	Maryland	HB				
January 1, 1949	Bobby Gage	Clemson	HB				
January 2, 1950	Bob Ward	Maryland	G				
January 1, 1951	Eddie Talboom	Wyoming	HB				
January 1, 1952	Jim Dooley	Miami (Florida)	HB				
Date Played	MVP	Team	Position	MVP	Team	Position	Ref
January 1, 1953	John Hall	Florida	RB	Marv Matuszak	Tulsa	T	
January 1, 1954	Bobby Cavazos	Texas Tech	RB	Vince Dooley	Auburn	QB	
December 31, 1954	Joe Childress	Auburn	FB	Billy Hooper	Baylor	QB	
December 31, 1955	Don Orr	Vanderbilt	QB	Joe Childress	Auburn	FB	
December 29, 1956	Wade Mitchell	Georgia Tech	QB	Corny Salvaterra	Pittsburgh	QB	
December 28, 1957	Bobby Gordon	Tennessee	TB	John David Crow	Texas A&M	HB	
December 27, 1958	Bobby Franklin	Ole Miss	QB	Dave Hudson	Florida	E	
January 2, 1960	Jim Mooty	Arkansas	HB	Maxie Baughan	Georgia Tech	LB	
December 31, 1960	Larry Libertore	Florida	QB	Bobby Ply	Baylor	QB	
December 30, 1961	Galen Hall	Penn State	QB	Joe Auer	Georgia Tech	HB	
December 29, 1962	Tom Shannon	Florida	QB	Dave Robinson	Penn State	E	
December 28, 1963	Ken Willard	North Carolina	RB	David Sicks	Air Force	C	
January 2, 1965	Steve Tensi; Fred Biletnikoff	Florida State	QB; SE	Carl McAdams	Oklahoma	LB	
December 31, 1965	Lenny Snow	Georgia Tech	TB	Donny Anderson	Texas Tech	RB	
December 31, 1966	Dewey Warren	Tennessee	QB	Floyd Little	Syracuse	HB	
December 30, 1967	Kim Hammond	Florida State	QB	Tom Sherman	Penn State	QB	
December 28, 1968	Terry McMillan	Missouri	QB	Mike Hall	Alabama	LB	
December 27, 1969	Mike Kelley	Florida	LB	Curt Watson	Tennessee	FB	
January 2, 1971	Pat Sullivan	Auburn	QB	Archie Manning	Ole Miss	QB	
December 31, 1971	Jimmy Poulos	Georgia	TB	James Webster	North Carolina	LB	
December 30, 1972	Wade Whatley	Auburn	QB	Mark Cooney	Colorado	LB	
December 29, 1973	Joe Barnes	Texas Tech	QB	Haskel Stanback	Tennessee	TB	
December 30, 1974	Phil Gargis	Auburn	QB	Earl Campbell	Texas	RB	
December 29, 1975	Steve Atkins	Maryland	TB	Sammy Green	Florida	LB	
December 27, 1976	Al Hunter	Notre Dame	HB	Jimmy Cefalo	Penn State	WR	
December 30, 1977	Matt Cavanaugh	Pittsburgh	QB	Jerry Butler	Clemson	SE	
December 29, 1978	Steve Fuller	Clemson	QB	Art Schlichter	Ohio State	QB	
December 28, 1979	Matt Kupec (Note: The bowl's official site omits Kupec as co-MVP for North Carolina in the 1979 game.); Amos Lawrence	North Carolina	QB; RB	John Wangler; Anthony Carter	Michigan	QB; WR	
December 29, 1980	Rick Trocano	Pittsburgh	QB	George Rogers	South Carolina	RB	
December 28, 1981	Kelvin Bryant; Ethan Horton	North Carolina	TB; TB	Gary Anderson	Arkansas	RB	
December 30, 1982	Greg Allen	Florida State	TB	Paul Woodside	West Virginia	K	
December 30, 1983	Tony Lilly	Florida	S	Owen Gill	Iowa	FB	
December 28, 1984	Thurman Thomas	Oklahoma State	RB	Mike Hold	South Carolina	QB	
December 30, 1985	Chip Ferguson	Florida State	QB	Thurman Thomas	Oklahoma State	RB	
December 27, 1986	Rodney Williams	Clemson	QB	Brad Muster	Stanford	RB	
December 31, 1987	Wendell Davis	LSU	SE	Harold Green	South Carolina	RB	
January 1, 1989	Wayne Johnson	Georgia	QB	Andre Rison	Michigan State	WR	
December 30, 1989	Levon Kirkland	Clemson	LB	Mike Fox	West Virginia	DT	
January 1, 1991	Offensive Line (Note: Michigan's offensive linemen in the January 1991 game were Tom Dohring, Matt Elliott, Steve Everitt, Dean Dingman, and Greg Skrepenak.)	Michigan	N/A	Tyrone Ashley	Ole Miss	DB	
December 29, 1991	Cale Gundy	Oklahoma	QB	Tyrone Davis	Virginia	DB	
December 31, 1992	Errict Rhett	Florida	RB	Reggie Lawrence	North Carolina State	WR	
December 31, 1993	Brian Burgdorf	Alabama	QB	Corey Holliday	North Carolina	WR	
December 30, 1994	James Stewart	Tennessee	TB	Maurice DeShazo	Virginia Tech	QB	
January 1, 1996	Donovan McNabb	Syracuse	QB	Peter Ford	Clemson	CB	
January 1, 1997	Oscar Davenport	North Carolina	QB	David Saunders	West Virginia	WR	
January 1, 1998	Chris Keldorf	North Carolina	QB	Nick Sorensen	Virginia Tech	QB	
January 1, 1999	Dez White; Joe Hamilton	Georgia Tech	WR; QB	Autry Denson	Notre Dame	RB	
January 1, 2000	Nate Webster	Miami (Florida)	LB	Joe Hamilton	Georgia Tech	QB	
January 1, 2001	Michael Vick	Virginia Tech	QB	Rod Gardner	Clemson	WR	
January 1, 2002	Javon Walker	Florida State	WR	André Davis	Virginia Tech	WR	
January 1, 2003	Philip Rivers	North Carolina State	QB	Cedric Hillard	Notre Dame	NG	
January 1, 2004	Scott McBrien	Maryland	QB	Brian King	West Virginia	DB	
January 1, 2005	Leon Washington	Florida State	RB	Kay-Jay Harris	West Virginia	RB	
January 2, 2006	Cedric Humes	Virginia Tech	RB	Hunter Cantwell	Louisville	QB	
January 1, 2007	Pat White	West Virginia	QB	Calvin Johnson	Georgia Tech	WR	
January 1, 2008	Graham Harrell	Texas Tech	QB	Chris Long (Note: Other sources list Mikell Simpson, who rushed for 170 yards, as the Virginia MVP for the 2008 game.)	Virginia	DE	
January 1, 2009	Joe Ganz	Nebraska	QB	DaQuan Bowers	Clemson	DE	
January 1, 2010	EJ Manuel	Florida State	QB	Noel Devine	West Virginia	HB	
January 1, 2011	Chris Relf	Mississippi State	QB	Denard Robinson	Michigan	QB	
January 2, 2012	Andre Debose	Florida	WR	Etienne Sabino	Ohio State	LB	
January 1, 2013	Jared Carpenter	Northwestern	S	Nickoe Whitley	Mississippi State	DB	
January 1, 2014	Quincy Enunwa	Nebraska	WR	Todd Gurley	Georgia	TB	
January 2, 2015	Joshua Dobbs	Tennessee	QB	Josey Jewell	Iowa	LB	
January 2, 2016	Terry Godwin	Georgia	WR	Trace McSorley	Penn State	QB	
December 31, 2016	Dedrick Mills	Georgia Tech	RB	Stephen Johnson II	Kentucky	QB	
December 30, 2017	Mark McLaurin	Mississippi State	S	Lamar Jackson	Louisville	QB	
December 31, 2018	Trayveon Williams	Texas A&M	RB	Ryan Finley	NC State	QB	
January 2, 2020	Eric Gray	Tennessee	RB	Peyton Ramsey	Indiana	QB	
January 2, 2021	Asim Rose Jr.	Kentucky	RB	Zonovan Knight	NC State	RB	
December 31, 2021	Sam Hartman	Wake Forest	QB	Johnny Langan	Rutgers	QB	
December 30, 2022	Tyler Buchner	Notre Dame	QB				
December 29, 2023	Phil Mafah; Barion Brown	Clemson; Kentucky	RB; WR				
January 2, 2025	Jaxson Dart	Ole Miss	QB				
December 27, 2025	Chandler Morris	Virginia	QB				

== Most appearances ==
Updated through the December 2025 edition (81 games, 162 appearances).

Teams with multiple appearances

Rank	Team	Appearances	Record
1	Clemson	10	5–5
2	Florida	9	7–2
3	Georgia Tech	8	4–4
T4	Florida State	7	6–0–1
T4	North Carolina	7	5–2
T4	Tennessee	7	4–2 ‡
T4	West Virginia	7	1–6
8	Auburn	6	4–2
T9	Georgia	5	3–1–1
T9	Virginia Tech	5	2–3
T9	Penn State	5	1–3–1
T9	NC State	5	1–4
T9	South Carolina	5	0–5
T14	Maryland	4	3–0–1
T14	Texas Tech	4	3–1
T14	Notre Dame	4	2–2
T14	Ole Miss	4	2–2
T14	Missouri	4	1–3

Rank	Team	Appearances	Record
T19	Mississippi State	3	2–1
T19	Oklahoma	3	2–1
T19	Pittsburgh	3	2–1
T19	Kentucky	3	1–2
T19	Michigan	3	1–2
T19	Virginia	3	1–2
T25	Miami (Florida)	2	2–0
T25	Nebraska	2	2–0
T25	Wake Forest	2	2–0
T25	Alabama	2	1–1
T25	Arkansas	2	1–1
T25	Oklahoma State	2	1–1
T25	Syracuse	2	1–1
T25	Texas A&M	2	1–1
T25	Baylor	2	0–2
T25	Iowa	2	0–2
T25	Louisville	2	0–2
T25	Ohio State	2	0–2

‡ Tennessee's record excludes their January 2020 win, which was vacated by the NCAA in July 2023.

Teams with a single appearance

Won (4): LSU, Northwestern, Vanderbilt, Wyoming
Lost (10): Air Force, Colorado, Duke, Indiana, Michigan State, Rutgers, Stanford, Texas, Tulsa, Washington & Lee

== Appearances by conference ==
Updated through the December 2025 edition (81 games, 162 appearances).

Conference	Record					Appearances by season			
Conference	Games	W	L	T	Win pct.	Won	Lost	Tied	Vacated
SEC	47	28	17	1	.620 ‡	1952*, 1954, 1955, 1956, 1957, 1958, 1960, 1962, 1966, 1969, 1970*, 1971, 1972, 1974, 1983, 1987, 1988*, 1992, 1993, 1994, 2010*, 2011*, 2014*, 2015*, 2017, 2018, 2020*, 2024*	1953*, 1955, 1958, 1959*, 1961, 1968, 1969, 1970*, 1973, 1975, 1990, 2012*, 2013*, 2016, 2022, 2023, 2025	1947*	2019*
ACC	35	20	15	0	.571	1963, 1975, 1978, 1979, 1981, 1986, 1989, 1996*, 1997*, 1998*, 2001*, 2002*, 2003*, 2004*, 2005*, 2009*, 2016, 2021, 2023, 2025	1971, 1977, 1991, 1992, 1993, 1995*, 1999*, 2000*, 2006*, 2007*, 2008*, 2017, 2018, 2020*, 2024*		
Independents	24	10	12	2	.458	1951*, 1961, 1964*, 1965, 1976, 1977, 1980, 1982, 1985, 2022	1956, 1962, 1963, 1966, 1976, 1980, 1982, 1984, 1987, 1989, 1998*, 2002*	1967, 1967	
Big East	12	4	8	0	.333	1995*, 1999*, 2000*, 2006*	1994, 1996*, 1997*, 2001*, 2003*, 2004*, 2005*, 2009*		
Big Ten	13	3	10	0	.231	1990, 2012*, 2013*	1978, 1979, 1983, 1988*, 2010*, 2011*, 2014*, 2015*, 2019*, 2021		
Big Eight	9	4	5	0	.444	1946*, 1968, 1984, 1991	1948*, 1949*, 1964*, 1972, 1985		
SoCon	8	3	4	1	.438	1945*, 1948*, 1949*	1945*, 1946*, 1950*, 1951*	1947*	
SWC	8	2	6	0	.250	1959*, 1973	1954, 1957, 1960, 1965, 1974, 1981		
Big 12	2	2	0	0	1.000	2007*, 2008*			
Border	1	1	0	0	1.000	1953*			
Skyline	1	1	0	0	1.000	1950*			
MVC	1	0	1	0	.000		1952*		
Pac-10	1	0	1	0	.000		1986		

‡ The SEC's win–loss–tie totals and winning percentage exclude Tennessee's win following the 2019 season (played in January 2020), which was vacated by the NCAA in July 2023.

- Games marked with an asterisk (*) were played in January of the following calendar year.
- Records reflect conference affiliations at the time each game was played. (Note: As of January 2021, there were conference records listed on the bowl's website, but they had not been updated for all editions that have been played and they did not reflect conference affiliations at the time each game was played.)
- Conferences that are defunct or no longer active in FBS are marked in italics.
- The Big Eight's record includes appearances when the conference was known as the Big Six and Big Seven.
- Big East teams made 12 appearances and were 4–8; the American Conference retains the conference charter following the 2013 split of the original Big East along football lines.
- Two teams from the same conference have met five times: 1945*, 1955, 1958, 1969, and 1970*. The first instance was SoCon teams, while the others have been SEC teams.
- Two independent teams have met four times: 1967, 1976, 1980, and 1982.
- Independent appearances (23): Air Force (1963), Florida State (1964*, 1967, 1982, 1985), Georgia Tech (1965), Miami-FL (1951*), Notre Dame (1976, 1998*, 2002*, 2022), Penn State (1961, 1962, 1967, 1976), Pitt (1956, 1977, 1980), South Carolina (1980, 1984, 1987), Syracuse (1966), and West Virginia (1982, 1989).

To date:

- Every current member of the SEC has appeared in at least one Gator Bowl. Former member Georgia Tech has also appeared, former member Tulane has not.
- Seven former members of the Big East appeared in the bowl, though not all while in the Big East: Louisville, Miami (FL), Pitt, Rutgers, Syracuse, Virginia Tech, and West Virginia. Five members have not: Boston College, Cincinnati, UConn, USF and Temple.
- Thirteen current members of the ACC have appeared in the bowl, though not all while in the ACC: Clemson, Duke, Florida State, Georgia Tech, Louisville, Miami (FL), UNC, NC State, Pitt, Syracuse, Virginia, Virginia Tech, and Wake Forest, as have two former members (Maryland and South Carolina). One member. Boston College, has yet to appear in the bowl.

== Gator Bowl Hall of Fame ==
The Gator Bowl created a Hall of Fame in 1989; new members were announced annually through 2013, with a total of 82 inductees at that time. After 2013, additions have occurred intermittently.

Year	Inductees	Ref.
1989	Dan Devine, Ray Graves, Ralph Jordan, Floyd Little, Archie Manning, Bobby Dodd	
1990	Vince Dooley, Bobby Gage, Frank Howard, Pat Sullivan, Bob Woodruff, George R. Olsen	
1991	Wally Butts, Bill Peterson, Ron Sellers, Ken Willard	
1992	Maxie Baughan, Lu Gambino, Don Faurot, Johnny Vaught	
1993	DeWitt Weaver, Tom Shannon, Joe Childress	
1994	Doug Dickey, Rip Engle, Larry Libertore Jr.	
1995	Fred Biletnikoff, Frank Broyles, Nicholas Sacrinty, Richard Stratton, Steve Tensi	
1996	Dave Robinson, Wade Mitchell, Jim Dooley, Dick Crum	
1997	Judge John "Papa" Hall, Gene Stallings, Kim Hammond, John F. Lanahan	
1998	Ross Browner, James Stewart, Danny Ford	
1999	Jack Bush, Walter C. Dunbar, Jay Solomon	
2000	Joe Paterno, Terry McMillan, Bob Bradley	
2001	John David Crow, Don Nehlen, Carlisle Jones	
2002	W. W. "Bill" Gay, Jackie Sherrill, Hugh Green	
2003	Donny Anderson, Rodney Hampton, Ash Verlander	
2004	Chip Ferguson, Bill Nimnicht Jr., Steve Spurrier, Greg Allen	
2005	Desmond Howard, Peter Kirill Sr., Peahead Walker	
2006	Dave Braine, Carl Cannon	
2007	Don Davis, George Rogers, Bear Bryant	
2008	Errict Rhett, Wendell Davis	
2009	Wilford C. Lyon, Jr, Gary Pajcic, Bob Golic	
2010	Bobby Bowden, Mike Tranghese	
2011	Pat Jones, Anthony Carter, Bill Nimnicht Sr.	
2012	Corky Rogers, Donald Orr	
2013	Donovin Darius	
2016	Frank Beamer, Tom Shouvlin	
2017	Leon Washington, Ronald L. Bailey	

=== 75th Anniversary All Gator Bowl Team ===
In September 2019, bowl organizers announced an All Gator Bowl Team, in commemoration of the 75th anniversary game, played in January 2020.

Offense				Defense			
Player	Pos.	Team	Game	Player	Pos.	Team	Game
Archie Manning	QB	Mississippi	No. 26	Ed Reed	DB	Miami	No. 55
Floyd Little	RB	Syracuse	No. 22	Tony Lilly	DB	Florida	No. 39
Larry Csonka	FB	Syracuse	No. 22	Hugh Green	DE	Pittsburgh	No. 36
Fred Biletnikoff	WR	Florida State	No. 20	Jack Youngblood	DE	Florida	No. 25
Andre Rison	WR	Michigan State	No. 44	Wilber Marshall	LB	Florida	No. 39
Ken MacAfee	TE	Notre Dame	No. 32	Donovin Darius	DB	Syracuse	No. 51
Mark May	T	Pittsburgh	No. 36	Mark McLaurin	DB	Mississippi State	No. 73
Greg Skrepenak	T	Michigan	No. 46	Matt Millen	DT	Penn State	No. 32
Dean Dingman	G	Michigan	No. 46	Ndamukong Suh	DT	Nebraska	No. 64
Zeke Smith	G	Auburn	No. 11	Ryan Shazier	LB	Ohio State	No. 67
Maxie Baughan	C	Georgia Tech	No. 15	Lawrence Taylor	LB	North Carolina	No. 35

== Game records ==
Team	Record, Team vs. Opponent	Year
Most points scored (one team)	52, shared by: Mississippi State vs. Michigan; Texas A&M vs. NC State; Ole Miss vs. Duke	2011; 2018; 2025
Most points scored (losing team)	38, South Carolina vs. Notre Dame	2022
Most points scored (both teams)	83, Notre Dame (45) vs. South Carolina (38)	2022
Fewest points allowed	0, most recently: Syracuse vs. Clemson	1996
Largest margin of victory	41, Syracuse (41) vs. Clemson (0)	1996
Total yards	715, Michigan vs. Ole Miss	Jan. 1991
Rushing yards	423, Auburn vs. Baylor	Dec. 1954
Passing yards	407, Texas Tech vs. Virginia	2008
First downs	40, Georgia Tech vs. West Virginia	2007
Fewest yards allowed		
Fewest rushing yards allowed	45, Missouri vs. Alabama	1968
Fewest passing yards allowed	0, Alabama vs. Missouri	1968
Individual	Record, Player, Team vs. Opponent	Year
All-purpose yards		
Touchdowns (overall)	4, shared by: Fred Biletnikoff, Florida State vs. Oklahoma; James Stewart, Tennessee vs. Virginia Tech Phil Mafah, Clemson vs. Kentucky	Jan. 1965; Dec. 1994; 2023
Rushing yards	236, Trayveon Williams, Texas A&M vs. NC State	2018
Rushing touchdowns	4, Phil Mafah, Clemson vs. Kentucky	2023
Passing yards	407, Graham Harrell, Texas Tech vs. Virginia	2008
Passing touchdowns	5, Steve Tensi, Florida State vs. Oklahoma	Jan. 1965
Receiving yards	252, Andre Rison, Michigan State vs. Georgia	Jan. 1989
Receiving touchdowns	4, Fred Biletnikoff, Florida State vs. Oklahoma	Jan. 1965
Tackles		
Sacks		
Interceptions	4, Jim Dooley, Miami (FL) vs. Clemson	1952
Long Plays	Record, Player, Team vs. Opponent	Year
Touchdown run	96, Mikell Simpson, Virginia vs. Texas Tech	2008
Touchdown pass	99, Quincy Enunwa, Nebraska vs Georgia	2014
Kickoff return	99, shared by: Andre Debose, Florida vs Ohio State; Sahmir Hagans, Duke vs. Ole Miss	2012; 2025
Punt return		
Interception return	100, O'Donnell Fortune, South Carolina vs. Notre Dame	2022
Fumble return		
Punt	76, Bobby Joe Green, Florida vs. Ole Miss	1958
Field goal	51, Brian Lee, Ole Miss vs. Michigan	Jan. 1991
Miscellaneous	Record, Teams	Year
Bowl Attendance	84,129, Florida State vs. West Virginia	2010

== Television coverage ==
- CBS (1955–1963)
- ABC (1964–1968)
- NBC (1969–1971)
- ABC (1972–1985)
- CBS (1986–1987)
- ESPN (1988–1990)
- TBS (1991–1994)
- NBC (1995–2006)
- CBS (2007–2010)
- ESPN2 (2011–2014)
- ESPN (2015 – Jan. 2025)
- ABC (Dec. 2025)
