= 1959 Vanderbilt Commodores football team =

American college football season

1959 Vanderbilt Commodores football
- Conference: Southeastern Conference
- Record: 5–3–2 (3–2–2 SEC)
- Head coach: Art Guepe (7th season)
- Home stadium: Dudley Field

1959 Southeastern Conference football standings
	Conf.					Overall
Team	W		L		T	W		L		T
No. 5 Georgia $	7	–	0	–	0	10	–	1	–	0
No. 3 LSU	5	–	1	–	0	9	–	2	–	0
No. 2 Ole Miss #	5	–	1	–	0	10	–	1	–	0
No. 10 Alabama	4	–	1	–	2	7	–	2	–	2
Auburn	4	–	3	–	0	7	–	3	–	0
Vanderbilt	3	–	2	–	2	5	–	3	–	2
Georgia Tech	3	–	3	–	0	6	–	5	–	0
Tennessee	3	–	4	–	1	5	–	4	–	1
No. 19 Florida	2	–	4	–	0	5	–	4	–	1
Kentucky	1	–	6	–	0	4	–	6	–	0
Tulane	0	–	5	–	1	3	–	6	–	1
Mississippi State	0	–	7	–	0	2	–	7	–	0
$ – Conference champion; ^{#} Berryman, Billingsley, Dunkel, Sagarin national champion; Rankings from AP Poll

The 1959 Vanderbilt Commodores football team represented Vanderbilt University in the 1959 college football season. The Commodores were led by head coach Art Guepe in his seventh season and finished the season with a record of five wins, three losses and two ties (5–3–2 overall, 3–2–2 in the SEC).

== Schedule ==
Date	Opponent	Site	Result	Attendance	Source
September 26	at No. 17 Georgia	Sanford Stadium; Athens, GA (rivalry)	L 6–21	40,000	
October 3	Alabama	Dudley Field; Nashville, TN	T 7–7	27,967	
October 10	No. 5 Ole Miss	Dudley Field; Nashville, TN (rivalry)	L 0–33	25,000	
October 17	No. 19 Florida^{†}	Dudley Field; Nashville, TN	W 13–6	21,500	
October 24	at Virginia*	Scott Stadium; Charlottesville, VA	W 33–0	11,000	
October 31	at Minnesota*	Memorial Stadium; Minneapolis, MN	L 6–20	49,284	
November 7	Kentucky	Dudley Field; Nashville, TN (rivalry)	W 11–6	25,000	
November 14	at Tulane	Tulane Stadium; New Orleans, LA	T 6–6	18,000	
November 21	Florence State*	Dudley Field; Nashville, TN	W 42–7	15,000	
November 28	at Tennessee	Shields–Watkins Field; Knoxville, TN (rivalry)	W 14–0	31,000	
*Non-conference game; ^{†}Homecoming; Rankings from AP Poll released prior to the game
