= 1959 Tulane Green Wave football team =

American college football season

1959 Tulane Green Wave football
- Conference: Southeastern Conference
- Record: 3–6–1 (0–5–1 SEC)
- Head coach: Andy Pilney (6th season)
- Home stadium: Tulane Stadium

1959 Southeastern Conference football standings
	Conf.					Overall
Team	W		L		T	W		L		T
No. 5 Georgia $	7	–	0	–	0	10	–	1	–	0
No. 3 LSU	5	–	1	–	0	9	–	2	–	0
No. 2 Ole Miss #	5	–	1	–	0	10	–	1	–	0
No. 10 Alabama	4	–	1	–	2	7	–	2	–	2
Auburn	4	–	3	–	0	7	–	3	–	0
Vanderbilt	3	–	2	–	2	5	–	3	–	2
Georgia Tech	3	–	3	–	0	6	–	5	–	0
Tennessee	3	–	4	–	1	5	–	4	–	1
No. 19 Florida	2	–	4	–	0	5	–	4	–	1
Kentucky	1	–	6	–	0	4	–	6	–	0
Tulane	0	–	5	–	1	3	–	6	–	1
Mississippi State	0	–	7	–	0	2	–	7	–	0
$ – Conference champion; ^{#} Berryman, Billingsley, Dunkel, Sagarin national champion; Rankings from AP Poll

The 1959 Tulane Green Wave football team was an American football team that represented Tulane University during the 1959 college football season as a member of the Southeastern Conference (SEC). In its sixth year under head coach Andy Pilney, Tulane compiled a 3–6–1 record (0–5–1 in conference games), finished in 11th place in the SEC, and was outscored by a total of 176 to 94.

The team gained an average of 132.9 rushing yards and 75.6 passing yards per game. On defense, it gave up an average of 154.7 rushing yards and 83.7 passing yards per game. Tulane's individual leaders included Phil Nugent with 511 passing yards, Terry Terrebonne with 408 rushing yards, and Pete Abadie with 188 receiving yards.

The Green Wave played its home games at Tulane Stadium in New Orleans.

== Schedule ==
Date	Opponent	Site	Result	Attendance	Source
September 18	Florida	Tulane Stadium; New Orleans, LA	L 0–30	30,000	
September 25	at Miami (FL)*	Miami Orange Bowl; Miami, FL	L 7–26	35,688	
October 3	Wake Forest*	Tulane Stadium; New Orleans, LA	W 6–0	18,000	
October 9	Detroit*	Tulane Stadium; New Orleans, LA	W 25–0		
October 17	at No. 5 Ole Miss	Hemingway Stadium; Oxford, MS (rivalry)	L 7–53	23,500	
October 24	No. 9 Georgia Tech	Tulane Stadium; New Orleans, LA	L 13–21	30,000	
October 30	Texas Tech*	Tulane Stadium; New Orleans, LA	W 17–7	15,000	
November 7	vs. Alabama	Ladd Memorial Stadium; Mobile, AL	L 7–19	29,000	
November 14	Vanderbilt	Tulane Stadium; New Orleans, LA	T 6–6	18,000	
November 21	at No. 3 LSU	Tiger Stadium; Baton Rouge, LA (Battle for the Rag)	L 6–14	65,057	
*Non-conference game; Rankings from AP Poll released prior to the game
