= 1960 Gator Bowl (January) =

American college football game

Georgia Tech Yellow Jackets	Arkansas Razorbacks
(6–4)	(8–2)
SEC	SWC
7	14
Head coach: Bobby Dodd	Head coach: Frank Broyles
	AP / Coaches; 9 / 9
	1	2	3	4	Total
Georgia Tech	7	0	0	0	7
Arkansas	0	7	7	0	14
- Date: January 2, 1960
- Season: 1959
- Stadium: Gator Bowl
- Location: Jacksonville, Florida
- MVP: Arkansas: Jim Mooty Georgia Tech: Maxie Baughan
- Referee: Burns McKinney (SWC; split crew: SWC, SEC)
- Attendance: 45,104
- Payout: US$196,851

United States TV coverage
- Network: CBS
- Announcers: Ray Scott

The 1960 Gator Bowl was a college football bowl game between the Georgia Tech Yellow Jackets representing the Southeastern Conference (SEC) and the Southwest Conference (SWC) co-champion Arkansas Razorbacks. Arkansas defeated Georgia Tech, 14–7, in front of 45,104 spectators. There were two players named Most Valuable Player: Jim Mooty of Arkansas and Maxie Baughan of Georgia Tech.

== Setting ==
The 1960 Gator Bowl featured Georgia Tech, led by Bobby Dodd, against his protege Frank Broyles, who coached Arkansas, and was a former GT alumnus. Georgia Tech was 11–2 in bowl games entering the contest.

Georgia Tech started 4–0, but struggled the rest of the year, losing to Auburn, Duke, and Georgia at home, and Alabama in Birmingham.

Arkansas finished their SWC schedule 5–1, losing only to #3 Texas, and winning a share of the conference championship. The Hogs also lost to #6 Ole Miss at Crump Stadium in a non-conference match-up.

The Yellow Jackets and Razorbacks had one common opponent, the SMU Mustangs. Georgia Tech defeated SMU 16–12, and Arkansas beat the Mustangs, 17–14.

== Game summary ==
Georgia Tech began the game by controlling the ball for over eleven minutes, but missed a field goal from the Arkansas 8-yard line. However, it took only two plays on Tech's second drive to hit pay dirt as Georgia Tech quarterback Marvin Tibbetts scrambled 51 yards for a touchdown, giving the Yellowjackets a 7-0 lead. Joe Paul Alberty scored from one yard out on the ensuing Razorback possession to tie the game at 7. In the second half, Hogs rushers Lance Alworth and Jim Mooty took over, working in tandem to go 78 yards with Mooty finishing the drive with a 19 yard score, putting Arkansas ahead 14-7. Neither team would score in the fourth quarter, and the Razorbacks would win their first Gator Bowl, 14-7, over the Ramblin' Wreck.

Arkansas' record in the postseason improved to 2–1–2, with Tech dropping to 11–3.

Two members were later inducted into the Gator Bowl Hall of Fame, Maxie Baughan, a center and linebacker named an All-American during 1959 from Georgia Tech, and Frank Broyles, the head coach of Arkansas.

Scoring summary

Quarter	Time	Drive			Team	Scoring information	Score	
Quarter	Time	Plays	Yards	TOP	Team	Scoring information	GT	ARK
1			55		GT	Marvin Tibbetts 51-yard touchdown run, Floyd Faucette kick good	7	0
2			62		ARK	Joe Paul Alberty 1-yard touchdown run, Freddy Akers kick good	7	7
3			78		ARK	Jim Mooty 19-yard touchdown run, Freddy Akers kick good	7	14
"TOP" = time of possession. For other American football terms, see Glossary of American football.							7	14
