= 1959 Mississippi State Maroons football team =

American college football season

1959 Mississippi State Maroons football
- Conference: Southeastern Conference
- Record: 2–7 (0–7 SEC)
- Head coach: Wade Walker (4th season)
- Home stadium: Scott Field

1959 Southeastern Conference football standings
	Conf.					Overall
Team	W		L		T	W		L		T
No. 5 Georgia $	7	–	0	–	0	10	–	1	–	0
No. 3 LSU	5	–	1	–	0	9	–	2	–	0
No. 2 Ole Miss #	5	–	1	–	0	10	–	1	–	0
No. 10 Alabama	4	–	1	–	2	7	–	2	–	2
Auburn	4	–	3	–	0	7	–	3	–	0
Vanderbilt	3	–	2	–	2	5	–	3	–	2
Georgia Tech	3	–	3	–	0	6	–	5	–	0
Tennessee	3	–	4	–	1	5	–	4	–	1
No. 19 Florida	2	–	4	–	0	5	–	4	–	1
Kentucky	1	–	6	–	0	4	–	6	–	0
Tulane	0	–	5	–	1	3	–	6	–	1
Mississippi State	0	–	7	–	0	2	–	7	–	0
$ – Conference champion; ^{#} Berryman, Billingsley, Dunkel, Sagarin national champion; Rankings from AP Poll

The 1959 Mississippi State Maroons football team was an American football team that represented Mississippi State University as a member of the Southeastern Conference (SEC) during the 1959 college football season. In their fourth year under head coach Wade Walker, the team compiled an overall record of 2–7, with a mark of 0–7 in conference play, and finished 12th in the SEC.

== Schedule ==
Date	Opponent	Site	Result	Attendance	Source
September 26	at No. 19 Florida	Florida Field; Gainesville, FL	L 13–14	33,330	
October 3	at No. 9 Tennessee	Shields–Watkins Field; Knoxville, TN	L 6–22	26,895	
October 10	Arkansas State*	Scott Field; Starkville, MS	W 49–14	13,000	
October 17	vs. Georgia	Grant Field; Atlanta, GA	L 0–15	25,000	
October 24	Memphis State*	Scott Field; Starkville, MS	W 28–23	16,000	
October 31	at Alabama	Denny Stadium; Tuscaloosa, AL (rivalry)	L 0–10	19,000	
November 7	at No. 8 Auburn	Legion Field; Birmingham, AL	L 0–31	38,000	
November 14	at No. 3 LSU	Tiger Stadium; Baton Rouge, LA (rivalry)	L 0–27	63,272	
November 28	No. 2 Ole Miss	Scott Field; Starkville, MS (Egg Bowl)	L 0–42	34,000	
*Non-conference game; Rankings from AP Poll released prior to the game
