= 1959 Kentucky Wildcats football team =

American college football season

1959 Kentucky Wildcats football
- Conference: Southeastern Conference
- Record: 4–6 (1–6 SEC)
- Head coach: Blanton Collier (6th season)
- Home stadium: McLean Stadium

1959 Southeastern Conference football standings
	Conf.					Overall
Team	W		L		T	W		L		T
No. 5 Georgia $	7	–	0	–	0	10	–	1	–	0
No. 3 LSU	5	–	1	–	0	9	–	2	–	0
No. 2 Ole Miss #	5	–	1	–	0	10	–	1	–	0
No. 10 Alabama	4	–	1	–	2	7	–	2	–	2
Auburn	4	–	3	–	0	7	–	3	–	0
Vanderbilt	3	–	2	–	2	5	–	3	–	2
Georgia Tech	3	–	3	–	0	6	–	5	–	0
Tennessee	3	–	4	–	1	5	–	4	–	1
No. 19 Florida	2	–	4	–	0	5	–	4	–	1
Kentucky	1	–	6	–	0	4	–	6	–	0
Tulane	0	–	5	–	1	3	–	6	–	1
Mississippi State	0	–	7	–	0	2	–	7	–	0
$ – Conference champion; ^{#} Berryman, Billingsley, Dunkel, Sagarin national champion; Rankings from AP Poll

The 1959 Kentucky Wildcats football team were an American football team that represented the University of Kentucky as a member of the Southeastern Conference during the 1959 college football season. In their sixth season under head coach Blanton Collier, the team compiled a 4–6 record (1–6 in the SEC).

== Schedule ==
Date	Opponent	Site	Result	Attendance	Source
September 19	Georgia Tech	McLean Stadium; Lexington, KY	L 12–14	35,000	
September 26	No. 4 Ole Miss	McLean Stadium; Lexington, KY	L 0–16	33,000	
October 2	at Detroit*	University of Detroit Stadium; Detroit, MI	W 32–7	20,460	
October 10	at No. 14 Auburn	Cliff Hare Stadium; Auburn, AL	L 0–33	30,000	
October 17	No. 1 LSU	McLean Stadium; Lexington, KY	L 0–9	33,230	
October 24	Georgia	McLean Stadium; Lexington, KY	L 7–14	25,000	
October 30	at Miami (FL)*	Miami Orange Bowl; Miami, FL	W 22–3	35,547	
November 7	at Vanderbilt	Dudley Field; Nashville, TN (rivalry)	L 6–11	25,000	
November 14	Xavier*	McLean Stadium; Lexington, KY	W 41–0		
November 21	No. 20 Tennessee	McLean Stadium; Lexington, KY (rivalry)	W 20–0	38,000	
*Non-conference game; Rankings from Coaches' Poll released prior to the game
