= 1959 Florida Gators football team =

American college football season

1959 Florida Gators football
- Conference: Southeastern Conference

Ranking
- Coaches: No. 19
- AP: No. 19
- Record: 5–4–1 (2–4 SEC)
- Head coach: Bob Woodruff (10th season)
- Home stadium: Florida Field

1959 Southeastern Conference football standings
	Conf.					Overall
Team	W		L		T	W		L		T
No. 5 Georgia $	7	–	0	–	0	10	–	1	–	0
No. 3 LSU	5	–	1	–	0	9	–	2	–	0
No. 2 Ole Miss #	5	–	1	–	0	10	–	1	–	0
No. 10 Alabama	4	–	1	–	2	7	–	2	–	2
Auburn	4	–	3	–	0	7	–	3	–	0
Vanderbilt	3	–	2	–	2	5	–	3	–	2
Georgia Tech	3	–	3	–	0	6	–	5	–	0
Tennessee	3	–	4	–	1	5	–	4	–	1
No. 19 Florida	2	–	4	–	0	5	–	4	–	1
Kentucky	1	–	6	–	0	4	–	6	–	0
Tulane	0	–	5	–	1	3	–	6	–	1
Mississippi State	0	–	7	–	0	2	–	7	–	0
$ – Conference champion; ^{#} Berryman, Billingsley, Dunkel, Sagarin national champion; Rankings from AP Poll

The 1959 Florida Gators football team represented the University of Florida during the 1959 college football season. The season was Bob Woodruff's tenth and last year as the head coach of the Florida Gators football team. The Gators celebrated a close conference win over the Mississippi State Maroons (14–13), and suffered close conference defeats to the Vanderbilt Commodores (13–6), the top-ranked LSU Tigers (9–0) and the eighth-ranked Auburn Tigers (6–0). Woodruff finished his tenure on a high note, with the Gators' victories over the Florida State Seminoles (18–8) and the twelfth-ranked Miami Hurricanes (23–14), their primary in-state rivals. Woodruff's 1959 Florida Gators finished with an overall record of 5–4–1 and a Southeastern Conference (SEC) record of 2–4, placing ninth among twelve SEC teams.

== Schedule ==
Date	Opponent	Rank	Site	Result	Attendance	Source
September 18	at Tulane		Tulane Stadium; New Orleans, LA	W 30–0	30,000	
September 26	Mississippi State	No. 19	Florida Field; Gainesville, FL	W 14–13	33,330	
October 3	Virginia*	No. 19	Florida Field; Gainesville, FL	W 55–10	25,136	
October 10	at Rice*	No. 17	Rice Stadium; Houston, TX	T 13–13	33,449	
October 17	at Vanderbilt	No. 19	Dudley Field; Nashville, TN	L 6–13	19,384	
October 24	No. 1 LSU^{†}		Florida Field; Gainesville, FL (rivalry)	L 0–9	47,578	
October 31	at No. 8 Auburn		Cliff Hare Stadium; Auburn, AL (rivalry)	L 0–6	31,681	
November 7	vs. No. 11 Georgia		Gator Bowl Stadium; Jacksonville, FL (rivalry)	L 10–21	40,726	
November 21	Florida State*		Florida Field; Gainesville, FL (rivalry)	W 18–8	38,359	
November 28	vs. No. 12 Miami (FL)*		Gator Bowl Stadium; Jacksonville, FL (rivalry)	W 23–14	23,681–25,000	
*Non-conference game; ^{†}Homecoming; Rankings from AP Poll released prior to the game

== Postseason ==
Despite having returned the Gators to competitive respectability within the Southeastern Conference (SEC) in his ten seasons as the Gators' coach and athletic director, University of Florida president J. Wayne Reitz declined to renew Woodruff's contract in 1959 after two previous contract extensions. Woodruff returned to the University of Tennessee, his alma mater, in 1963, where he became the long-time athletic director of the Tennessee Volunteers sports program. During the 1950s, the Gators compiled an overall record of 53–42–6 (.555) during the decade.
