= 1959 major college football rankings =

- Season: 1959
- Bowl season: 1959–60 bowl games
- Preseason No. 1: LSU
- End of season champions: Syracuse

Two human polls comprised the 1959 major college football rankings. Unlike most sports, college football's governing body, the NCAA, does not bestow a national championship, instead that title is bestowed by one or more different polling agencies. There are two main weekly polls that begin in the preseason—the AP Poll and the Coaches Poll.

== Legend ==
	Increase in ranking
	Decrease in ranking
	Not ranked previous week
	National champion
(#–#)	Win–loss record
(Italics)	Number of first place votes
т	Tied with team above or below also with this symbol

== AP poll ==
The final AP poll was released on December 7, at the end of the 1959 regular season, weeks before the major bowls.

	Preseason Aug	Week 1 Sep 21	Week 2 Sep 28	Week 3 Oct 5	Week 4 Oct 12	Week 5 Oct 19	Week 6 Oct 26	Week 7 Nov 2	Week 8 Nov 9	Week 9 Nov 16	Week 10 Nov 23	Week 11 Nov 30	Week 12 (Final) Dec 7	
1.	LSU (60)	LSU (1–0) (64)	LSU (2–0) (48)	LSU (3–0) (69)	LSU (4–0) (83)	LSU (5–0) (68)	LSU (6–0) (71)	LSU (7–0) (132)	Syracuse (7–0) (111)	Syracuse (8–0) (126)	Syracuse (9–0) (121)	Syracuse (9–0) (95)	Syracuse (10–0) (134)	1.
2.	Oklahoma (48)	Oklahoma (0–0) (12)	Northwestern (1–0) (20)	Northwestern (2–0) (30)	Northwestern (3–0) (10)	Northwestern (4–0) (23)	Northwestern (5–0) (25)	Northwestern (6–0) (30)	Texas (8–0) (85)	Ole Miss (8–1) (68)	Ole Miss (8–1) (32)	Ole Miss (9–1) (49)	Ole Miss (9–1) (47)	2.
3.	Auburn (17)	Auburn (0–0) (6)	Ole Miss (2–0) (4)	Georgia Tech (3–0)	Texas (4–0) (10)	Texas (5–0) (8)	Ole Miss (6–0) (46)	Texas (7–0) (6)	LSU (7–1) (13)	LSU (8–1) (16)	LSU (9–1) (1)	LSU (9–1) (6)	LSU (9–1) (6)	3.
4.	SMU (6)	Ole Miss (1–0) (6)	Army (1–0)	Texas (3–0)	Georgia Tech (4–0) (6)	Ole Miss (5–0) (18)	Texas (6–0) (6)	Syracuse (6–0) (14)	USC (7–0) (14)	USC (8–0) (16)	Texas (8–1) (1)	Texas (9–1)	Texas (9–1) (1)	4.
5.	Army (4)	Clemson (1–0)	Iowa (1–0) (4)	Ole Miss (3–0) (2)	Ole Miss (4–0) (6)	USC (4–0) (12)	Syracuse (5–0) (11)	Ole Miss (6–1) (1)	Ole Miss (7–1) (14)	Texas (8–1) (1)	Wisconsin (7–2) (1)	Georgia (9–1) (2)	Georgia (9–1) (3)	5.
6.	Wisconsin (10)	SMU (0–0)	Clemson (2–0) (7)	USC (3–0) (9)	Purdue (2–0–1) (5)	Syracuse (4–0) (4)	USC (5–0) (6)	USC (6–0) (4)	Northwestern (6–1) (2)	Georgia (8–1) (6)	Georgia (8–1) (2)	Wisconsin (7–2) (15)	Wisconsin (7–2) (5)	6.
7.	Ohio State (2)	Army (0–0)	Georgia Tech (2–0)	Purdue (1–0–1)	USC (3–0) (7)	Auburn (3–1) (5)	Penn State (6–0) (6)	Penn State (7–0) (8)	Wisconsin (6–1) (19)	Penn State (8–1) (6)	USC (8–1)	TCU (8–2)	TCU (8–2)	7.
8.	Ole Miss (5)	Wisconsin (0–0)	Notre Dame (1–0) (1)	Tennessee (2–0)	Syracuse (3–0) (2)	Penn State (5–0) (3)	Auburn (4–1) (5)	Auburn (5–1) (3)	Auburn (6–1) (9)	Northwestern (6–2) (1)	TCU (7–2)	Washington (9–1) (2)	Washington (9–1)	8.
9.	Iowa (4)	TCU (1–0)	Tennessee (1–0)	Wisconsin (2–0)	Iowa (2–1) (5)	Georgia Tech (4–1)	Georgia Tech (5–1) (1)	Wisconsin (5–1) (2)	Tennessee (5–1–1) (4)	Wisconsin (6–2)	Washington (9–1) (4)	Arkansas (8–2)	Arkansas (8–2)	9.
10.	Northwestern (6)	Northwestern (0–0)	Texas (2–0)	Iowa (1–1)	Penn State (4–0) (4)	Arkansas (4–1) (1)	Wisconsin (4–1) (2)	Clemson (5–1) (2)	Penn State (7–1)	TCU (6–2)	Arkansas (8–2) (1)	Clemson (8–2)	Alabama (7–1–2) (5)	10.
11.	Purdue (2)	USC (1–0) (4)	USC (2–0) (1)	South Carolina (3–0) (3)	Auburn (2–1) (1)	Oregon (5–0) (1)	Purdue (3–1–1)	Georgia (6–1)	Clemson (6–1) (3)	Michigan State (5–3) (1)	Auburn (7–2)	Alabama (7–1–2) (6)	Clemson (8–2)	11.
12.	North Carolina (6)	Ohio State (0–0)	Wisconsin (1–0)	Syracuse (2–0) (1)	Arkansas (4–0)	Wisconsin (3–1)	Clemson (4–1) (2)	Washington (6–1)	Georgia (7–1) (2)	Auburn (6–2)	Miami (FL) (6–3) (5)	Illinois (5–3–1) (1)	Penn State (8–2)	12.
13.	TCU (2)	Iowa (0–0) т	Georgia (2–0)	Oklahoma (1–1) (2)	Illinois (2–1)	Illinois (3–1)	Yale (5–0) (1)	Tennessee (4–1–1)	Washington (7–1)	Arkansas (7–2)	Illinois (5–3–1)	USC (8–2)	Illinois (5–3–1)	13.
14.	South Carolina (4)	Navy (1–0) т	Ohio State (1–0)	Auburn (1–1)	Tennessee (2–1)	Purdue (2–1–1)	Georgia (5–1)	Purdue (3–1–2)	Oregon (7–1) (2)	Washington (8–1)	Clemson (7–2)	Penn State (8–2)	USC (8–2)	14.
15.	Air Force (1)	Texas (1–0)	Navy (2–0)	SMU (1–1)	Clemson (3–1) т	Iowa (2–2)	TCU (4–2)	Oregon (6–1)	Georgia Tech (6–2)	Oregon (8–1) (1)	Penn State (8–2)	Oklahoma (7–3)	Oklahoma (7–3)	15.
16.	Notre Dame (3)	Georgia Tech (1–0)	South Carolina (2–0)	Penn State (3–0) (2)	SMU (2–1) т	TCU (3–2)	Oregon (5–1)	Arkansas (5–2)	Iowa (4–3) (1) т	Iowa (5–3) (3)	Pittsburgh (6–4)	Wyoming (9–1)	Wyoming (9–1)	16.
17.	Texas	Georgia (1–0)	Auburn (0–1)	Florida (3–0)	Air Force (3–0)	Clemson (3–1)	Arkansas (4–2) т	TCU (5–2)	North Texas State (8–0) т	Alabama (5–1–2) (4)	Oklahoma (6–3)	UCLA (5–3–1)	Notre Dame (5–5)	17.
18.	Clemson (1)	Penn State (1–0) (2)	Air Force (1–0)	Air Force (2–0)	Washington (4–0)	Oklahoma (3–2)	Washington (5–1) т	Air Force (4–1–1)	TCU (5–2)	Miami (FL) (5–3)	Missouri (6–4) (2)	Florida (5–4–1)	Missouri (6–4)	18.
19.	Michigan State (1)	Florida (1–0)	Florida (2–0)	Arkansas (3–0)	Florida (3–0–1)	Yale (4–0) (1)	Oklahoma (4–2)	Georgia Tech (5–2)	Michigan State (4–3)	Clemson (6–2)	Alabama (6–1–2) (1)	Notre Dame (5–5)	Florida (5–4–1)	19.
20.	Syracuse	South Carolina (1–0)	Syracuse (1–0)	Illinois (1–1)	Pittsburgh (3–1)	Ohio State (2–0)	Tennessee (3–1–1)	North Texas State (7–0)	Arkansas (6–2)	Tennessee (5–2–1)	UCLA (4–3–1)	Missouri (6–4)	Pittsburgh (6–4)	20.
	Preseason Aug	Week 1 Sep 21	Week 2 Sep 28	Week 3 Oct 5	Week 4 Oct 12	Week 5 Oct 19	Week 6 Oct 26	Week 7 Nov 2	Week 8 Nov 9	Week 9 Nov 16	Week 10 Nov 23	Week 11 Nov 30	Week 12 (Final) Dec 7	
		Dropped: Air Force; Michigan State; North Carolina; Notre Dame; Purdue; Syracuse	Dropped: Oklahoma; Penn State; SMU; TCU	Dropped: Army; Clemson; Georgia; Navy; Notre Dame; Ohio State	Dropped: Oklahoma; South Carolina; Wisconsin	Dropped: Air Force; Florida; Pittsburgh; SMU; Tennessee; Washington	Dropped: Illinois; Iowa; Ohio State	Dropped: Oklahoma; Yale	Dropped: Air Force; Purdue	Dropped: Georgia Tech; North Texas State	Dropped: Iowa; Michigan State; Northwestern; Oregon; Tennessee	Dropped: Auburn; Miami (FL); Pittsburgh	Dropped: UCLA	

== UPI Coaches Poll ==
The final United Press International (UPI) Coaches Poll was released prior to the bowl games, on December 8.
Syracuse received 31 of the 35 first-place votes; Mississippi received three and Washington one.

Ranking	Team	Conference	Bowl
1	Syracuse	Independent	Won Cotton, 23–14
2	Ole Miss	SEC	Won Sugar, 21–0
3	LSU	SEC	Lost Sugar, 0–21
4	Texas	Southwest	Lost Cotton, 14–23
5	Georgia	SEC	Won Orange, 14–0
6	Wisconsin	Big Ten	Lost Rose, 8–44
7	Washington	AAWU	Won Rose, 44–8
8	TCU	Southwest	Lost Bluebonnet, 7–23
9	Arkansas	Southwest	Won Gator, 14–7
10	Penn State	Independent	Won Liberty, 7–0
11	Clemson	ACC	Won Bluebonnet, 23–7
12	Illinois	Big Ten	none
13	Alabama	SEC	Lost Liberty, 0–7
13	USC	AAWU	none
15	Auburn	SEC	none
16	Michigan State	Big Ten	none
17	Oklahoma	Big Eight	none
18	Notre Dame	Independent	none
19	Florida	SEC	none
19	Pittsburgh	Independent	none
19	Missouri	Big Eight	Lost Orange, 0–14

- Prior to the 1975 season, the Big Ten and AAWU (later Pac-8) conferences allowed only one postseason participant each, for the Rose Bowl.
- The Ivy League has prohibited its members from participating in postseason football since the league was officially formed in 1954.

== Litkenhous Ratings ==
The final Litkenhous Ratings were released in December 1959. The top 25 teams according to Litkenhous were:

1. Syracuse (11-0) - 111.0
2. Ole Miss (10-1) - 110.5
3. LSU (9-2) - 105.1
4. TCU (8-3) - 102.4
5. Texas (9-2) - 102.0
6. Auburn (7-3) - 100.8
7. Georgia (10-1) - 100.2
8. Northwestern (6-3) - 98.1
9. Iowa (5-4) - 97.9
10. Purdue (5-2-2) - 96.7
11. Michigan State (5-4) - 96.5
12. USC (8-2) -96.6
13. Arkansas (9-2) - 96.3
14. Washington (10-1) - 96.2
15. Wisconsin (7-3) - 95.8
16. Penn State (9-2) - 95.2
17. Georgia Tech - 94.9
18. Illinois - 94.7
19. Oklahoma - 04.7
20. Clemson - 94.3
21. Indiana - 93.7
22. Kentucky - 93.6
23. SMU - 93.0
24. Florida - 92.9
25. UCLA - 91.5

== See also ==
- 1959 College Football All-America Team
