= 1959 Miami Hurricanes football team =

American college football season

1959 Miami Hurricanes football
- Conference: Independent
- Record: 6–4
- Head coach: Andy Gustafson (12th season)
- Home stadium: Miami Orange Bowl

1959 Southern major college football independents records
	Conf.			Overall
Team	W	L	T	W		L		T
Miami (FL)		–		6	–	4	–	0
Oklahoma State		–		6	–	4	–	0
Navy		–		5	–	4	–	1
Florida State		–		4	–	6	–	0
Texas Tech		–		4	–	6	–	0

The 1959 Miami Hurricanes football team represented the University of Miami as an independent during the 1959 college football season. Led by 12th-year head coach Andy Gustafson, the Hurricanes played their home games at the Miami Orange Bowl in Miami, Florida. Miami finished the season 6–4.

== Schedule ==
Date	Opponent	Rank	Site	Result	Attendance	Source
September 25	Tulane		Miami Orange Bowl; Miami, FL	W 26–7	35,688	
October 3	at Florida State		Doak Campbell Stadium; Tallahassee, FL (rivalry)	W 7–6	18,600	
October 10	at No. 1 LSU		Tiger Stadium; Baton Rouge, LA	L 3–27	64,864–67,000	
October 16	Navy		Miami Orange Bowl; Miami, FL	W 23–8	51,694	
October 23	No. 7 Auburn		Miami Orange Bowl; Miami, FL	L 6–21	42,986	
October 30	Kentucky		Miami Orange Bowl; Miami, FL	L 3–22	35,547	
November 6	North Carolina		Miami Orange Bowl; Miami, FL	W 14–7	31,136	
November 13	South Carolina		Miami Orange Bowl; Miami, FL	W 26–6	31,797	
November 20	No. 11 Michigan State	No. 18	Miami Orange Bowl; Miami, FL	W 18–13	40,870	
November 28	vs. Florida	No. 12	Gator Bowl Stadium; Jacksonville, FL (rivalry)	L 14–23	23,681–25,000	
Rankings from AP Poll released prior to the game

== Roster ==
- QB Fran Curci
- Jim Otto, Sr.
