= 1959 Tennessee Volunteers football team =

American college football season

1959 Tennessee Volunteers football
- Conference: Southeastern Conference
- Record: 5–4–1 (3–4–1 SEC)
- Head coach: Bowden Wyatt (5th season)
- Home stadium: Shields–Watkins Field

1959 Southeastern Conference football standings
	Conf.					Overall
Team	W		L		T	W		L		T
No. 5 Georgia $	7	–	0	–	0	10	–	1	–	0
No. 3 LSU	5	–	1	–	0	9	–	2	–	0
No. 2 Ole Miss #	5	–	1	–	0	10	–	1	–	0
No. 10 Alabama	4	–	1	–	2	7	–	2	–	2
Auburn	4	–	3	–	0	7	–	3	–	0
Vanderbilt	3	–	2	–	2	5	–	3	–	2
Georgia Tech	3	–	3	–	0	6	–	5	–	0
Tennessee	3	–	4	–	1	5	–	4	–	1
No. 19 Florida	2	–	4	–	0	5	–	4	–	1
Kentucky	1	–	6	–	0	4	–	6	–	0
Tulane	0	–	5	–	1	3	–	6	–	1
Mississippi State	0	–	7	–	0	2	–	7	–	0
$ – Conference champion; ^{#} Berryman, Billingsley, Dunkel, Sagarin national champion; Rankings from AP Poll

The 1959 Tennessee Volunteers (variously "Tennessee", "UT" or the "Vols") represented the University of Tennessee in the 1959 college football season. Playing as a member of the Southeastern Conference (SEC), the team was led by head coach Bowden Wyatt, in his fifth year, and played their home games at Shields–Watkins Field in Knoxville, Tennessee. They finished the season with a record of five wins, four losses and one tie (5–4–1 overall, 3–4–1 in the SEC).

== Schedule ==
Date	Opponent	Rank	Site	Result	Attendance	Source
September 26	No. 3 Auburn		Shields–Watkins Field; Knoxville, TN (rivalry)	W 3–0	40,500	
October 3	Mississippi State	No. 9	Shields–Watkins Field; Knoxville, TN	W 22–6	26,895	
October 10	No. 3 Georgia Tech	No. 8	Shields–Watkins Field; Knoxville, TN (rivalry)	L 7–14	45,021	
October 17	at Alabama	No. 14	Legion Field; Birmingham, AL (Third Saturday in October)	T 7–7	42,000	
October 24	Chattanooga*		Shields–Watkins Field; Knoxville, TN	W 23–0	23,000–25,000	
October 31	at North Carolina*	No. 20	Kenan Memorial Stadium; Chapel Hill, NC	W 29–7	30,000	
November 7	No. 1 LSU^{†}	No. 13	Shields–Watkins Field; Knoxville, TN	W 14–13	47,000	
November 14	vs. Ole Miss	No. 9	Crump Stadium; Memphis, TN (rivalry)	L 7–37	32,515	
November 21	at Kentucky	No. 20	McLean Stadium; Lexington, KY (rivalry)	L 0–20	38,000	
November 28	Vanderbilt		Shields–Watkins Field; Knoxville, TN (rivalry)	L 0–14	31,000	
*Non-conference game; ^{†}Homecoming; Rankings from AP Poll released prior to the game

== Roster ==
- TB Bill Majors, Jr.

== Team players drafted into the NFL ==
Player	Position	Round	Pick	NFL club
Jerry DeLucca	Tackle	Expansion draft		Dallas Cowboys
