= 1959 Auburn Tigers football team =

American college football season

1959 Auburn Tigers football
- Conference: Southeastern Conference

Ranking
- Coaches: No. 15
- Record: 7–3 (4–3 SEC)
- Head coach: Ralph Jordan (9th season)
- Home stadium: Cliff Hare Stadium

1959 Southeastern Conference football standings
	Conf.					Overall
Team	W		L		T	W		L		T
No. 5 Georgia $	7	–	0	–	0	10	–	1	–	0
No. 3 LSU	5	–	1	–	0	9	–	2	–	0
No. 2 Ole Miss #	5	–	1	–	0	10	–	1	–	0
No. 10 Alabama	4	–	1	–	2	7	–	2	–	2
Auburn	4	–	3	–	0	7	–	3	–	0
Vanderbilt	3	–	2	–	2	5	–	3	–	2
Georgia Tech	3	–	3	–	0	6	–	5	–	0
Tennessee	3	–	4	–	1	5	–	4	–	1
No. 19 Florida	2	–	4	–	0	5	–	4	–	1
Kentucky	1	–	6	–	0	4	–	6	–	0
Tulane	0	–	5	–	1	3	–	6	–	1
Mississippi State	0	–	7	–	0	2	–	7	–	0
$ – Conference champion; ^{#} Berryman, Billingsley, Dunkel, Sagarin national champion; Rankings from AP Poll

The 1959 Auburn Tigers football team represented Auburn University in the 1959 college football season. It was the Tigers' 68th overall and 27th season as a member of the Southeastern Conference (SEC). The team was led by head coach Ralph Jordan, in his ninth year, and played their home games at Cliff Hare Stadium in Auburn and Legion Field in Birmingham, Alabama. They finished with a record of seven wins and three losses (7–3 overall, 4–3 in the SEC).

== Schedule ==
Date	Opponent	Rank	Site	Result	Attendance	Source
September 26	at Tennessee	No. 3	Shields–Watkins Field; Knoxville, TN	L 0–3	40,500	
October 3	Hardin–Simmons*	No. 17	Cliff Hare Stadium; Auburn, AL	W 35–12	23,000	
October 10	Kentucky	No. 14	Cliff Hare Stadium; Auburn, AL	W 33–0	30,000	
October 17	at No. 4 Georgia Tech	No. 11	Grant Field; Atlanta, GA	W 7–6	44,174	
October 23	at Miami (FL)*	No. 7	Miami Orange Bowl; Miami, FL	W 21–6	42,986	
October 31	Florida^{†}	No. 8	Cliff Hare Stadium; Auburn, AL (rivalry)	W 6–0	35,000	
November 7	Mississippi State	No. 8	Legion Field; Birmingham, AL	W 31–0	38,000	
November 14	at No. 12 Georgia	No. 8	Sanford Stadium; Athens, GA (rivalry)	L 13–14	50,000	
November 21	Mississippi Southern*	No. 12	Cliff Hare Stadium; Auburn, AL	W 28–7	20,300	
November 28	vs. No. 19 Alabama	No. 11	Legion Field; Birmingham, AL (Iron Bowl)	L 0–10	44,000	
*Non-conference game; ^{†}Homecoming; Rankings from AP Poll released prior to the game
