= Jim Mooty =

American football player (born 1937)

No. 24
- Position: Safety

Personal information
- Born: June 15, 1937 (age 89); El Dorado, Arkansas, U.S.
- Listed height: 5 ft 11 in (1.80 m)
- Listed weight: 177 lb (80 kg)

Career information
- High school: El Dorado
- College: Arkansas
- AFL draft: 1960

Career history
- Dallas Cowboys (1960)

Awards and highlights
- First-team All-American (1959); 2× First-team All-SWC (1958, 1959)

Career statistics
- Games played: 7
- Stats at Pro Football Reference

James W. Mooty (born June 15, 1937) is an American former professional football player who was a safety for the Dallas Cowboys of the National Football League (NFL). He was selected first-team All-American by the Associated Press in 1959 while playing college football for the Arkansas Razorbacks.

== Early life ==
Mooty attended El Dorado High School where he was a four-sport athlete. He was named to the football All-state team three years in a row and was a prep All-American as a senior.

== College career ==
He accepted a scholarship from the University of Arkansas, where he was an All-American running back for head coach Frank Broyles and a teammate of Lance Alworth, Wayne Harris and Barry Switzer.

As a junior, he left school and went back home after the sixth loss of the season. Switzer, Mooty's roommate went along with Broyles to ask him to return. The team also voted to take Mooty back after losing two games.

In 1959, he nearly quit football again because of head injuries, but came back to have his best season registering 519 rushing yards and 5 rushing touchdowns (led the league). He helped his team win the Southwest Conference Co-Championship with a 9-2 record, which included the clinching touchdown run against Texas A&M University. He was the Most Valuable Player in the 1960 Gator Bowl after scoring the winning touchdown, with a 19-yard run against Georgia Tech, still considered to be a storied play in school history.

Mooty finished his college career after rushing for 1,152 yards on 211 carries for an average of 5.4 yards, 9 touchdowns and 13 receptions for 156 yards. He returned kickoffs, highlighted by a 100-yard return against Hardin–Simmons University in 1958. He also practiced college baseball.

He was inducted into the University of Arkansas Sports Hall of Honor. In 1981, he was inducted into the Arkansas Sports Hall of Fame. In 2011, he was inducted into the Union County Sports Hall of Fame. He was also named to the University of Arkansas All-Century Team and All-Decade Team of the 1950s.

== Professional career ==
Mooty was signed by the Dallas Cowboys after going undrafted in the 1960 NFL draft, because he was considered small to play running back in the National Football League.

He was a part of the franchise's inaugural season and was a backup safety in 7 games, after suffering a torn quadriceps in his left leg during training camp. On June 9, 1961, he announced his retirement.

== Personal life ==
Mooty is involved in the Hospital Clinics business.
