= Alabama–Penn State football series =

American college football series

- Alabama Crimson Tide Penn State Nittany Lions
- First meeting: December 19, 1959; Penn State, 7–0
- Latest meeting: September 10, 2011; Alabama, 27–11
- Next meeting: TBD

Statistics
- Total meetings: 15
- All-time series: Alabama leads, 10–5
- Largest victory: Alabama, 42–21 (1982); Penn State, 23–3 (1986)
- Longest win streak: Alabama, 4 (1975–1982)
- Current win streak: Alabama, 2 (2010–present)

Locations of Alabama and Penn State

The Alabama–Penn State football series is an American college football matchup between the Alabama Crimson Tide football team of the University of Alabama and Penn State Nittany Lions football team of Pennsylvania State University. Following their three Bowl games in 1959, 1975 and 1979, the teams met for 10 straight years in what was ofted described as one of the nation's top intersectional rivalries.

After their 1990 game, the series became dormant with Penn State's move to the Big Ten Conference, but the teams met again in 2010 in Tuscaloosa and 2011 in State College.

== Bowl games ==
=== 1959 Liberty Bowl ===
In a defensive struggle, the only scoring of the game came at the close of the second quarter, as Penn State threw for a touchdown on a fake field goal, leading to a 7–0 win for the Nittany Lions.

=== 1975 Sugar Bowl ===
With each team successfully kicking two field goals, the winning margin was a third-quarter touchdown by the Crimson Tide, as Alabama won, 13–6.

=== 1979 Sugar Bowl ===
Alabama scored in the second quarter, then Penn State answered in the third, then Alabama took a 14–7 lead on a touchdown set up by a 62-yard punt return. Penn State had a chance to tie in the fourth, but Chuck Fusina threw an interception into the Alabama end zone. Then the Crimson Tide had a chance to put the game away, but fumbled the football back to Penn State at the Nittany Lion 19-yard-line with four minutes to go. Penn State drove to a first and goal at the Alabama eight. On third and goal from the one, Fusina asked Bama linebacker Marty Lyons "What do you think we should do?", and Lyons answered "You'd better pass." On third down, Penn State was stopped inches short of the goal line. On fourth down, Penn State was stopped again, Barry Krauss meeting Mike Guman and throwing him back for no gain. Alabama held on for a 14–7 victory.

== Game results ==
Alabama victories	Penn State victories

No.	Date	Location	Winning team		Losing team	
1	December 19, 1959	Philadelphia, PA	#12 Penn State	7	#10 Alabama	0
2	December 31, 1975	New Orleans, LA	#3 Alabama	13	#7 Penn State	6
3	January 1, 1979	New Orleans, LA	#2 Alabama	14	#1 Penn State	7
4	November 14, 1981	State College, PA	#6 Alabama	31	#5 Penn State	16
5	October 9, 1982	Birmingham, AL	#4 Alabama	42	#3 Penn State	21
6	October 8, 1983	State College, PA	Penn State	34	#3 Alabama	28
7	October 13, 1984	Tuscaloosa, AL	Alabama	6	#11 Penn State	0
8	October 12, 1985	State College, PA	#8 Penn State	19	#10 Alabama	17
9	October 25, 1986	Tuscaloosa, AL	#5 Penn State	23	#2 Alabama	3
10	September 12, 1987	State College, PA	#19 Alabama	24	#11 Penn State	13
11	October 22, 1988	Birmingham, AL	Alabama	8	Penn State	3
12	October 28, 1989	State College, PA	#6 Alabama	17	#14 Penn State	16
13	October 27, 1990	Tuscaloosa, AL	Penn State	9	Alabama	0
14	September 11, 2010	Tuscaloosa, AL	#1 Alabama	24	#18 Penn State	3
15	September 10, 2011	State College, PA	#3 Alabama	27	#23 Penn State	11
Series: Alabama leads 10–5

== See also ==
- List of NCAA college football rivalry games
