= 1959 LSU Tigers football team =

American college football season

1959 LSU Tigers football

Sugar Bowl, L 0–21 vs. Ole Miss
- Conference: Southeastern Conference

Ranking
- Coaches: No. 3
- AP: No. 3
- Record: 9–2 (5–1 SEC)
- Head coach: Paul Dietzel (5th season)
- Home stadium: Tiger Stadium

1959 Southeastern Conference football standings
	Conf.					Overall
Team	W		L		T	W		L		T
No. 5 Georgia $	7	–	0	–	0	10	–	1	–	0
No. 3 LSU	5	–	1	–	0	9	–	2	–	0
No. 2 Ole Miss #	5	–	1	–	0	10	–	1	–	0
No. 10 Alabama	4	–	1	–	2	7	–	2	–	2
Auburn	4	–	3	–	0	7	–	3	–	0
Vanderbilt	3	–	2	–	2	5	–	3	–	2
Georgia Tech	3	–	3	–	0	6	–	5	–	0
Tennessee	3	–	4	–	1	5	–	4	–	1
No. 19 Florida	2	–	4	–	0	5	–	4	–	1
Kentucky	1	–	6	–	0	4	–	6	–	0
Tulane	0	–	5	–	1	3	–	6	–	1
Mississippi State	0	–	7	–	0	2	–	7	–	0
$ – Conference champion; ^{#} Berryman, Billingsley, Dunkel, Sagarin national champion; Rankings from AP Poll

The 1959 LSU Tigers football team was an American football team that represented Louisiana State University (LSU) as a member of the Southeastern Conference (SEC) during the 1959 college football season. In their fifth year under head coach Paul Dietzel, the Tigers compiled an overall record of 9–2, with a conference record of 5–1, and finished tied for second in the SEC. Halfback Billy Cannon won the Heisman Trophy for the season.

== Schedule ==
Date	Opponent	Rank	Site	TV	Result	Attendance	Source
September 19	Rice*	No. 1	Tiger Stadium; Baton Rouge, LA	NBC	W 26–3	48,613	
September 26	No. 9 TCU*	No. 1	Tiger Stadium; Baton Rouge, LA		W 10–0	65,694	
October 3	vs. Baylor*	No. 1	State Fair Stadium; Shreveport, LA		W 22–0	32,308–35,455	
October 10	Miami (FL)*	No. 1	Tiger Stadium; Baton Rouge, LA		W 27–3	64,864–67,000	
October 17	at Kentucky	No. 1	McLean Stadium; Lexington, KY		W 9–0	33,230	
October 24	at Florida	No. 1	Florida Field; Gainesville, FL (rivalry)		W 9–0	47,578	
October 31	No. 3 Ole Miss^{†}	No. 1	Tiger Stadium; Baton Rouge, LA (rivalry)		W 7–3	67,327	
November 7	at No. 13 Tennessee	No. 1	Shields–Watkins Field; Knoxville, TN		L 13–14	45,682	
November 14	Mississippi State	No. 3	Tiger Stadium; Baton Rouge, LA (rivalry)		W 27–0	63,272	
November 21	Tulane	No. 3	Tiger Stadium; Baton Rouge, LA (Battle for the Rag)		W 14–6	65,057	
January 1, 1960	vs. No. 2 Ole Miss	No. 3	Tulane Stadium; New Orleans, LA (Sugar Bowl)	NBC	L 0–21	81,141	
*Non-conference game; ^{†}Homecoming; Rankings from AP Poll released prior to the game

== Preseason ==
The Tigers were a near unanimous preseason favorite to repeat as national champions in 1959. Most of the players from the national championship team of 1958 were returning.

== Season ==
LSU had no real trouble in winning its first 6 games in 1959, though its offense was not as potent as 1958's. Its defense made up for it by being even stingier, allowing only 6 points in 6 games. In the 7th game of the season LSU faced its sternest test—undefeated Ole Miss on Halloween in Tiger Stadium. That game between No. 1 LSU and No. 3 Ole Miss was touted as 1959's "Game of the Year." Ole Miss held a 3–0 lead until the 4th quarter, often punting on first down due to the very wet conditions on the field. With about 10 minutes left in the game, Ole Miss punted and Billy Cannon took the punt at the LSU 11. Cannon charted a course along the Ole Miss sidelines, weaving between Rebel defenders, eluding tacklers, and racing towards the goal line for an 89 yard punt return touchdown. Ole Miss then started a determined drive and marched down to the two yard line where it was 4th and goal with 18 seconds left. Ole Miss quarterback Doug Elmore was stopped at the one by Cannon and his teammates to ensure the 7–3 victory. However, the next week, LSU lost its next SEC game against Tennessee at Knoxville, 14–13, when Cannon's attempt at a 2 pt conversion failed. The loss not only cost LSU a shot as repeating as national champion, it also denied them the SEC championship, which went to the Georgia Bulldogs, and ended a 19-game win streak—the longest in school history—that started in the last game of 1957. The Tigers defeated Mississippi State and Tulane to finish the season 9–1, and they were ranked No. 3 in the nation behind No. 1 Syracuse and No. 2 Ole Miss.

Cannon won the Heisman Trophy by one of the widest margins in the history of the trophy balloting at the time. The Tigers were invited to play in the Sugar Bowl, and their opponent was Ole Miss, in a rematch. At first Paul Dietzel, LSU's coach, was not anxious to replay the Rebels, but he was persuaded to do so by the athletic director, Jim Corbett. By the time January 1 came, three LSU star players were injured, including quarterback Warren Rabb, and halfback/defensive backs Wendell Harris and Johnny Robinson. The Tigers were soundly beaten by the Rebels, 21–0, and were outgained 373–74.

Following the Sugar Bowl, Cannon signed a professional contract with the Houston Oilers of the American Football League, which was scheduled to begin play in September 1960, spurning an offer from the National Football League's Los Angeles Rams.
