= 1959 Georgia Tech Yellow Jackets football team =

American college football season

1959 Georgia Tech Yellow Jackets football

Gator Bowl, L 7–14 vs. Arkansas
- Conference: Southeastern Conference
- Record: 6–5 (3–3 SEC)
- Head coach: Bobby Dodd (15th season)
- Captain: Maxie Baughan
- Home stadium: Grant Field

1959 Southeastern Conference football standings
	Conf.					Overall
Team	W		L		T	W		L		T
No. 5 Georgia $	7	–	0	–	0	10	–	1	–	0
No. 3 LSU	5	–	1	–	0	9	–	2	–	0
No. 2 Ole Miss #	5	–	1	–	0	10	–	1	–	0
No. 10 Alabama	4	–	1	–	2	7	–	2	–	2
Auburn	4	–	3	–	0	7	–	3	–	0
Vanderbilt	3	–	2	–	2	5	–	3	–	2
Georgia Tech	3	–	3	–	0	6	–	5	–	0
Tennessee	3	–	4	–	1	5	–	4	–	1
No. 19 Florida	2	–	4	–	0	5	–	4	–	1
Kentucky	1	–	6	–	0	4	–	6	–	0
Tulane	0	–	5	–	1	3	–	6	–	1
Mississippi State	0	–	7	–	0	2	–	7	–	0
$ – Conference champion; ^{#} Berryman, Billingsley, Dunkel, Sagarin national champion; Rankings from AP Poll

The 1959 Georgia Tech Yellow Jackets football team represented the Georgia Institute of Technology during the 1959 college football season. The Yellow Jackets were led by 15th-year head coach Bobby Dodd and played their home games at Grant Field in Atlanta. After winning their first four games of the season, three of which were victories over top ten opponents, Georgia Tech sat at No. 4 in the AP poll. Georgia Tech's season was derailed by several close losses, however, and they finished the regular season unranked with a 6–4 record. They were invited to the Gator Bowl, where they lost to Southwest Conference co-champion Arkansas.

The team's statistical leaders included Fred Braselton with 368 passing yards and Floyd Faucette with 330 rushing yards.

== Schedule ==
Date	Opponent	Rank	Site	TV	Result	Attendance	Source
September 19	at Kentucky		McLean Stadium; Lexington, KY		W 14–12	35,000	
September 26	No. 6 SMU*	No. 16	Grant Field; Atlanta, GA		W 16–12	43,000	
October 3	No. 6 Clemson*	No. 7	Grant Field; Atlanta, GA (rivalry)		W 16–6	44,174	
October 10	at No. 8 Tennessee	No. 3	Shields–Watkins Field; Knoxville, TN (rivalry)		W 14–7	45,021	
October 17	No. 11 Auburn	No. 4	Grant Field; Atlanta, GA (rivalry)		L 6–7	44,174	
October 24	at Tulane	No. 9	Tulane Stadium; New Orleans, LA		W 21–13	30,000	
October 31	Duke*^{†}	No. 9	Grant Field; Atlanta, GA		L 7–10	44,174	
November 7	at Notre Dame*	No. 19	Notre Dame Stadium; South Bend, IN (rivalry)		W 14–10	58,575	
November 14	at Alabama	No. 15	Legion Field; Birmingham, AL (rivalry)		L 7–9	43,500	
November 28	No. 6 Georgia		Grant Field; Atlanta, GA (rivalry)		L 14–21	44,174	
January 2	vs. No. 9 Arkansas*		Gator Bowl Stadium; Jacksonville, FL (Gator Bowl)	CBS	L 7–14	45,104	
*Non-conference game; ^{†}Homecoming; Rankings from AP Poll released prior to the game
