= 1959 Alabama Crimson Tide football team =

American college football season

1959 Alabama Crimson Tide football

Liberty Bowl, L 0–7 vs. Penn State
- Conference: Southeastern Conference

Ranking
- Coaches: No. 13
- AP: No. 10
- Record: 7–2–2 (4–1–2 SEC)
- Head coach: Bear Bryant (2nd season)
- Captains: Marlin Dyess; Jim Blevins
- Home stadium: Denny Stadium; Legion Field; Ladd Stadium

1959 Southeastern Conference football standings
	Conf.					Overall
Team	W		L		T	W		L		T
No. 5 Georgia $	7	–	0	–	0	10	–	1	–	0
No. 3 LSU	5	–	1	–	0	9	–	2	–	0
No. 2 Ole Miss #	5	–	1	–	0	10	–	1	–	0
No. 10 Alabama	4	–	1	–	2	7	–	2	–	2
Auburn	4	–	3	–	0	7	–	3	–	0
Vanderbilt	3	–	2	–	2	5	–	3	–	2
Georgia Tech	3	–	3	–	0	6	–	5	–	0
Tennessee	3	–	4	–	1	5	–	4	–	1
No. 19 Florida	2	–	4	–	0	5	–	4	–	1
Kentucky	1	–	6	–	0	4	–	6	–	0
Tulane	0	–	5	–	1	3	–	6	–	1
Mississippi State	0	–	7	–	0	2	–	7	–	0
$ – Conference champion; ^{#} Berryman, Billingsley, Dunkel, Sagarin national champion; Rankings from AP Poll

The 1959 Alabama Crimson Tide football team (variously "Alabama", "UA" or "Bama") represented the University of Alabama in the 1959 college football season. It was the Crimson Tide's 65th overall and 26th season as a member of the Southeastern Conference (SEC). The team was led by head coach Bear Bryant, in his second year, and played their home games at Denny Stadium in Tuscaloosa, Legion Field in Birmingham and at Ladd Stadium in Mobile, Alabama. They finished with a record of seven wins, two losses and two ties (7–2–2 overall, 4–1–2 in the SEC) and with a loss against Penn State in the inaugural Liberty Bowl.

The Crimson Tide opened the 1959 season with three consecutive games on the road. After they dropped the opener at Georgia, they rebounded with a victory at Houston and then played Vanderbilt to a 7–7 tie at Dudley Field. Alabama then defeated Chattanooga in the first Denny Stadium game of the season and tied Tennessee 7–7 at Legion Field. On homecoming, the Crimson Tide defeated Mississippi State and then one week later defeated Tulane at Ladd Stadium. The win over Tulane was both the 100th Southeastern Conference victory in the history of the Alabama program and the 100th all-time victory for Bryant as a head coach.

Alabama then went on to upset Georgia Tech and as a result entered the polls the following week for the first time since the 1954 season. The Crimson Tide then closed the regular season with a wins over Memphis State and Auburn that snapped what was then a school record five-game Iron Bowl losing streak. Alabama next accepted an invitation to compete in the inaugural Liberty Bowl where they were upset by Penn State in the final game of the season.

== Schedule ==
Date	Opponent	Rank	Site	TV	Result	Attendance	Source
September 19	at Georgia		Sanford Stadium; Athens, GA (rivalry)		L 3–17	40,000	
September 26	at Houston*		Rice Stadium; Houston, TX		W 3–0	27,000	
October 3	at Vanderbilt		Dudley Field; Nashville, TN		T 7–7	27,967	
October 10	No. 6 (small) Chattanooga*		Denny Stadium; Tuscaloosa, AL		W 13–0	20,000	
October 17	No. 14 Tennessee		Legion Field; Birmingham, AL (Third Saturday in October)		T 7–7	42,000	
October 31	Mississippi State^{†}		Denny Stadium; Tuscaloosa, AL (rivalry)		W 10–0	19,000	
November 7	Tulane		Ladd Stadium; Mobile, AL		W 19–7	29,000	
November 14	No. 15 Georgia Tech		Legion Field; Birmingham, AL (rivalry)		W 9–7	43,500	
November 21	No. 8 (small) Memphis State*	No. 17	Denny Stadium; Tuscaloosa, AL		W 14–7	30,200	
November 28	vs. No. 11 Auburn	No. 19	Legion Field; Birmingham, AL (Iron Bowl)		W 10–0	44,000	
December 19	vs. No. 12 Penn State*	No. 10	Philadelphia Municipal Stadium; Philadelphia, PA (Liberty Bowl, rivalry)	NBC	L 0–7	36,211	
*Non-conference game; ^{†}Homecoming; Rankings from AP Poll released prior to the game

== Game summaries ==
=== Georgia ===
Team	1	2	3	4	Total
Alabama	0	0	3	0	3
• Georgia	3	7	0	7	17

- Date: September 19
- Location: Sanford Stadium
  Athens, Georgia
- Game attendance: 40,000

To open the 1959 season, Fran Tarkenton led the Georgia Bulldogs to a 17–3 victory over the Crimson Tide at Athens. The Bulldogs took an early 3–0 lead after Durward Pennington connected on a 35-yard field goal in the first quarter. Georgia then extended their lead further to 10–0 at halftime on a 40-yard Bill Godfrey touchdown run in the second quarter. After Alabama responded with their only points in the third on a 23-yard Fred Sington Jr. field goal, Tarkenton scored on a one-yard touchdown run in the fourth quarter that made the final score 17–3. The 17 points scored were the most allowed by a Bryant led defense to that point, and the Georgia win marked their first in an opening game since their 1954 season.

=== Houston ===
Team	1	2	3	4	Total
• Alabama	0	0	3	0	3
Houston	0	0	0	0	0

- Date: September 26
- Location: Rice Stadium
  Houston, Texas
- Game attendance: 27,000

A week after they opened the season with a loss at Georgia, the Crimson Tide shutout the Houston Cougars 3–0 in the first all-time meeting between the schools. On a rainy evening, the only points scored came in the third quarter on a 25-yard Fred Sington Jr. field goal. In the game, the Crimson Tide defense had three interceptions, but was also penalized eight times for 99-yards in the victory.

=== Vanderbilt ===
Team	1	2	3	4	Total
Alabama	0	0	0	7	7
Vanderbilt	0	7	0	0	7

- Date: October 3
- Location: Dudley Field
  Nashville, Tennessee
- Game attendance: 27,967

For the third time in as many seasons, the Crimson Tide played the Vanderbilt Commodores to a tie, this time by a 7–7 margin in Nashville. After a scoreless first quarter, the Commodores took a 7–0 halftime lead after Tom Moore scored on a short touchdown run in the second quarter. Alabama tied the game early in the fourth quarter on a short Pat Trammell touchdown run, Russell Morris missed a 37-yard field goal attempt later in the quarter and the game ended tied 7–7.

=== Chattanooga ===
Team	1	2	3	4	Total
Chattanooga	0	0	0	0	0
• Alabama	7	0	6	0	13

- Date: October 10
- Location: Denny Stadium
  Tuscaloosa, Alabama
- Game attendance: 20,000

In rainy conditions for the first home game of the 1959 season, the Crimson Tide shutout the Chattanooga Mocs 13–0 in Tuscaloosa. Alabama took a 7–0 first quarter lead when Robert Skelton scored on an 18-yard touchdown run. Pat Trammell then scored the second touchdown of the game in the third on a 54-yard run that made the score 13–0. For the game, Trammell rushed for 106 yards on 17 carries to lead the Crimson Tide.

=== Tennessee ===
Third Saturday in October

Team	1	2	3	4	Total
#14 Tennessee	7	0	0	0	7
Alabama	0	7	0	0	7

- Date: October 17
- Location: Legion Field
  Birmingham, Alabama
- Game attendance: 42,000

In their annual rivalry game against Tennessee, Alabama played the No. 14 Volunteers to a 7–7 tie in Birmingham. Tennessee took an early 7–0 lead in the first quarter. Bill Majors scored on a two-yard touchdown run that capped a nine-play, 45-yard drive. The Crimson Tide responded in the second quarter when Pat Trammell threw a 21-yard touchdown pass to Stanley Bell that tied the score 7–7. The only other scoring opportunity came late in the fourth quarter, and after Frank Sington Jr. missed an eight-yard field goal for Alabama, the game ended in a 7–7 tie.

=== Mississippi State ===
Team	1	2	3	4	Total
Mississippi State	0	0	0	0	0
• Alabama	0	3	7	0	10

- Date: October 31
- Location: Denny Stadium
  Tuscaloosa, Alabama
- Game attendance: 19,000

On homecoming in Tuscaloosa, Alabama shutout the Mississippi State Maroons 10–0 and secured their first conference victory of the 1959 season. After a scoreless first quarter, Alabama took a 3–0 halftime lead after Fred Sington Jr. connected on a 25-yard field goal. They then extended their lead to 10–0 in the third quarter when Bobby Skelton threw a 36-yard touchdown pass to Stanley Bell. The Crimson Tide defense was dominant in the victory as they had four interceptions for the game.

=== Tulane ===
Team	1	2	3	4	Total
Tulane	0	7	0	0	7
• Alabama	0	7	6	6	19

- Date: November 7
- Location: Ladd Stadium
  Mobile, Alabama
- Game attendance: 29,000

In their annual home game at Ladd Stadium in Mobile, the Crimson Tide overcame five turnovers and defeated the Tulane Green Wave 19–7. After a scoreless first quarter, Alabama took a 7–0 lead after Marlin Dyess scored on a four-yard touchdown run. The Greenies responded later in the quarter with a 10-yard Phil Nugent touchdown pass to Pete Abadie that tied the game 7–7 at halftime. The Crimson Tide then scored a pair of second half touchdowns. The first came in the third quarter on a 22-yard Bobby Skelton pass to Tommy Brooker and the second in the fourth quarter on a 10-yard W. E. Richardson run. The win was both the 100th Southeastern Conference victory in the history of the Alabama program and the 100th victory for Bryant as a head coach.

=== Georgia Tech ===
Team	1	2	3	4	Total
#15 Georgia Tech	7	0	0	0	7
• Alabama	6	3	0	0	9

- Date: November 14
- Location: Legion Field
  Birmingham, Alabama
- Game attendance: 43,500

Behind a 43-yard game-winning Fred Sington Jr. field goal, the Crimson Tide upset the Georgia Tech Yellow Jackets 9–7 at Legion Field. Tech took an early 7–0 after Gary O'Steen fumbled the opening kickoff that gave the Yellow Jackets possession at the Alabama 27-yard line. Six plays later Marvin Tibbetts scored on a two-yard run. Alabama's only touchdown drive was set up on their next possession after Tech fumbled a punt that was recovered by W. E. Richardson at their 49-yard line. Eight plays later, Marlin Dyess scored on a 10-yard run, but Bryant then elected to go for a two-point conversion that was unsuccessful and the Jackets led 7–6. What proved to be the game-winning field goal came on a 43-yard Sington kick in the second quarter that made the score 9–7.

=== Memphis State ===
Team	1	2	3	4	Total
Memphis State	0	7	0	0	7
• #17 Alabama	0	0	8	6	14

- Date: November 21
- Location: Denny Stadium
  Tuscaloosa, Alabama
- Game attendance: 30,200

After their upset victory over Georgia Tech, the Crimson Tide entered the polls for the first time since the 1954 season in the No. 17 position. Down 7–0 at halftime to underdog Memphis State, the Crimson Tide rallied with a pair of second half touchdowns and defeated the Tigers 14–7 at Denny Stadium. After a scoreless first quarter, Memphis took a 7–0 lead after Jimmy Wright scored on a one-yard touchdown run that capped an 84-yard drive. Alabama then took an 8–7 lead in the third quarter when W. E. Richardson scored on a fourth-and-three touchdown run followed it with a successful two-point conversion. Mal Moore then threw a four-yard touchdown pass to William Rice in the fourth quarter that made the final score 14–7.

=== Auburn ===
Iron Bowl

Team	1	2	3	4	Total
#11 Auburn	0	0	0	0	0
• #19 Alabama	0	3	7	0	10

- Date: November 28
- Location: Legion Field
  Birmingham, Alabama
- Game attendance: 44,000

As they entered their season finale against No. 11 Auburn, the Crimson Tide dropped two spots to the No. 19 position after their closer than expected game against Memphis State. At Legion Field in the annual Iron Bowl game, Alabama shutout the Tigers 10–0 and won their first game against their rival since the 1953 season. After a scoreless first quarter, Alabama took a 3–0 halftime lead on a 27-yard Tommy Brooker field goal. They extended their lead further to 10–0 in the third quarter on a 39-yard Bobby Skelton touchdown pass to Marlin Dyess.

=== Penn State ===
Liberty Bowl

Team	1	2	3	4	Total
#10 Alabama	0	0	0	0	0
• #12 Penn State	0	7	0	0	7

- Date: December 19
- Location: Philadelphia Municipal Stadium
  Philadelphia, Pennsylvania
- Game attendance: 36,211

After their victory over Auburn in their season finale, Bryant turned down an invitation to play in the Bluegrass Bowl. However, two days later they accepted an invitation to compete in the inaugural Liberty Bowl against the Penn State Nittany Lions in the first all-time meeting between the schools. As they entered their contest against Penn State, Alabama finished the season with the No. 10 ranking and the Nittany Lions with the No. 12 ranking. At Municipal Stadium, Alabama was upset 7–0 by Penn State with the only touchdown scored in the second quarter on a 17-yard touchdown reception by Roger Kochman from Galen Hall on a fake field goal attempt. This bowl game marked the beginning of a school record 25 consecutive bowl appearances.

== Personnel ==
=== Varsity letter winners ===
Player	Hometown	Position
Charles Allen	Athens, Alabama	Tackle
Stanley Bell	Anniston, Alabama	End
Jim Blevins	Moulton, Alabama	Tackle
Bobby Boylston	Atlanta	Tackle
Tommy Brooker	Demopolis, Alabama	End
James Cain	Pensacola, Florida	tackle
Donald Cochran	Birmingham, Alabama	Guard
Marlin Dyess	Elba, Alabama	Halfback
Milton Frank	Huntsville, Alabama	Guard
Leon Fuller	Nederland, Texas	Halfback
William Hannah	Indianapolis, Indiana	Tackle
Roy Holsomback	West Blocton, Alabama	Guard
Connell Johnson	High Point, North Carolina	Halfback
Bud Moore	Birmingham, Alabama	End
Duff Morrison	Memphis, Tennessee	Halfback
Billy Neighbors	Northport, Alabama	Tackle
Richard O’Dell	Lincoln, Alabama	End
John O’Linger	Scottsboro, Alabama	Center
Robert O'Steen	Anniston, Alabama	Fullback
James Patton	Tuscumbia, Alabama	End
Gary Phillips	Dothan, Alabama	Guard
John Paul Poole	Florence, Alabama	End
William Rice	Troy, Alabama	Guard
Jerry Rich	Attalla, Alabama	Halfback
W. E. Richardson	Jasper, Alabama	Halfback
Norbie Ronsonet	Biloxi, Mississippi	End
Jack Rutledge	Birmingham, Alabama	Guard
Wayne Sims	Columbiana, Alabama	Guard
Fred Sington Jr.	Birmingham, Alabama	Tackle
Bobby Skelton	Pell City, Alabama	Quarterback
Laurien "Goobie" Stapp	Birmingham, Alabama	Quarterback/Placekicker
Ravis Stickney	Key West, Florida	Fullback
Pat Trammell	Scottsboro, Alabama	Quarterback
William "Buddy" Wesley	Talladega, Alabama	Fullback
Tommy White	West Blocton, Alabama	Fullback

=== Coaching staff ===
Name	Position	Seasons at Alabama	Alma mater
Bear Bryant	Head coach	2	Alabama (1936)
Sam Bailey	Assistant coach	2	Ouachita Baptist (1949)
Charlie Bradshaw	Assistant coach	1	Kentucky (1950)
Jerry Claiborne	Assistant coach	2	Kentucky (1950)
Phil Cutchin	Assistant coach	2	Kentucky (1943)
Bob Ford	Assistant coach	1	Memphis State (1955)
Jim Goostree	Assistant coach	3	Tennessee (1952)
Pat James	Assistant coach	2	Kentucky (1951)
Bobby Drake Keith	Assistant coach	2	Texas A&M (1957)
Carney Laslie	Assistant coach	3	Alabama (1934)
Hayden Riley	Assistant coach	2	Alabama (1948)
Gene Stallings	Assistant coach	2	Texas A&M (1957)
