= 1960 Orange Bowl =

American college football game

- 26th Orange Bowl
- The Miami Orange Bowl in Miami, Florida, hosted the Orange Bowl.
Missouri Tigers	Georgia Bulldogs
(6–4)	(9–1)
Big Seven	SEC
0	14
Head coach: Dan Devine	Head coach: Wally Butts
AP / Coaches; 18 / 20	AP / Coaches; 5 / 5
	1	2	3	4	Total
Missouri	0	0	0	0	0
Georgia	7	7	0	0	14
- Date: January 1, 1960
- Season: 1959
- Stadium: Orange Bowl
- Location: Miami, Florida
- Favorite: Georgia by 12 points
- Referee: Charles Bowen (SEC; split crew: SEC, Big Seven)
- Attendance: 75,280

United States TV coverage
- Network: CBS
- Announcers: Joe Boland, Paul Christman

The 1960 Orange Bowl was the 26th edition of the college football bowl game, played at the Miami Orange Bowl in Miami, on Friday, January 1. Part of the 1959–60 bowl game season, the No. 5 Georgia Bulldogs of the Southeastern Conference (SEC) shut out the No. 18 Missouri Tigers of the Big Eight Conference, 14–0.

== Teams ==
=== Missouri ===
Missouri was the runner-up in the Big Eight Conference, selected to play in this game over Oklahoma due to the conference's new (and short-lived) rule against consecutive bowl appearances; the Sooners had won the previous two Orange Bowls. The Tigers had four losses in the regular season.

=== Georgia ===
Georgia was champion of the Southeastern Conference for the first time in eleven years, and made their first bowl appearance since 1950. Their only loss was in early October at South Carolina.

== Game summary ==
Georgia quarterback Fran Tarkenton threw a 29-yard pass to Bill McKenny to give the Bulldogs a 7–0 lead in the first. In the second quarter, he scrambled and threw a touchdown pass of 33 yards to Aaron Box to make it 14–0 at halftime, and the second half was scoreless. The Missouri offense outgained the Bulldogs in yards, but could not reach the end zone due to three interceptions. Tarkenton threw nine-of-16 passes for 131 yards.

== Aftermath ==
Missouri won the Orange Bowl the next year. Georgia's next major bowl was seven years later, when they won the Cotton Bowl.

The Bulldogs did not return to the Orange Bowl until December 31, 2021. They were ranked No. 3 and faced No. 2 Michigan in the 2021 College Football Playoff Semifinal, winning 34–11.

This was the only meeting between the two programs until Missouri joined the SEC in 2012 and was slotted in the Eastern Division.

== Statistics ==
Statistics	Georgia	Missouri
First downs	14	17
Rushing yards	88	80
Passing yards	128	180
Total offense	216	260
Interceptions	2	3
Punts–Average	7–46.9	6–38.7
Fumbles–Lost	1–0	3–0
Penalties–Yards	7–44	7–72
