= 1959 Liberty Bowl =

American college football game

- Inaugural Liberty Bowl
Alabama Crimson Tide	Penn State Nittany Lions
(7–1–2)	(8–2)
SEC	Independent
0	7
Head coach: Bear Bryant	Head coach: Rip Engle
AP / Coaches; 10 / 13	AP / Coaches; 12 / 10
	1	2	3	4	Total
Alabama	0	0	0	0	0
Penn State	0	7	0	0	7
- Date: December 19, 1959
- Season: 1959
- Stadium: Philadelphia Municipal Stadium
- Location: Philadelphia, Pennsylvania
- MVP: Jay Huffman (C, Penn State)
- Favorite: Penn State by 1
- Attendance: 36,211

United States TV coverage
- Network: NBC
- Announcers: Lindsey Nelson; Red Grange

The 1959 Liberty Bowl, part of the 1959 bowl game season, took place on December 19, 1959, at Philadelphia Municipal Stadium in Philadelphia, Pennsylvania. It was the inaugural edition of the Liberty Bowl. The competing teams were the Alabama Crimson Tide, representing the Southeastern Conference (SEC), and the Penn State Nittany Lions, competing as a football independent. In a game dominated by both defenses, Penn State was victorious in by a final score of 7–0. The game is notable as the first football game Alabama ever played against an integrated team.

== Teams ==
=== Alabama ===
The 1959 Alabama squad finished the regular season with a 7–1–2 record and played in a bowl for the first time since the 1954 Cotton Bowl Classic. This was the first bowl for Bear Bryant as head coach of the Crimson Tide.

After Navy turned down an offer, Alabama accepted a bid to play in the inaugural Liberty Bowl on November 30. Alabama had been offered a spot in the Bluegrass Bowl, scheduled to be played the same day as the Liberty Bowl, but turned down that invitation; the Bluegrass Bowl was subsequently canceled.

=== Penn State ===
After starting the season 7–0, Penn State dropped two of their final three games to finish the regular season with a record of 8–2. The Nittany Lions accepted a bid for the Liberty Bowl on November 23 with the other opponent identified as being either Georgia, Georgia Tech, SMU or Navy. Alabama was selected as the opponent after Navy turned down an offer. The game marked the first bowl for Penn State since the 1948 Cotton Bowl Classic.

== Game summary ==
In a game dominated by both defenses, the only points were scored at the end of the second quarter by the Nittany Lions on a fake field goal. This lone touchdown was scored by Roger Kochman on a 17-yard reception from Galen Hall with Sam Stellatella adding the extra point.

Scoring summary

Quarter	Time	Drive			Team	Scoring information	Score	
Quarter	Time	Plays	Yards	TOP	Team	Scoring information	Alabama	Penn State
2	00:00		2 plays, 22 yards	00:30	Penn State	Roger Kochman 17-yard touchdown reception from Galen Hall on a fake field goal attempt, Sam Stellatella kick good	0	7
"TOP" = time of possession. For other American football terms, see Glossary of American football.							0	7

== See also ==
- Alabama–Penn State football rivalry
