= 1959 Ole Miss Rebels football team =

American college football season

1959 Ole Miss Rebels football

National champion (Berryman, Billingsley, Dunkel, Sagarin) Sugar Bowl champion

Sugar Bowl, W 21–0 vs. LSU
- Conference: Southeastern Conference

Ranking
- Coaches: No. 2
- AP: No. 2
- Record: 10–1 (5–1 SEC)
- Head coach: Johnny Vaught (13th season)
- Home stadium: Hemingway Stadium; Crump Stadium

1959 Southeastern Conference football standings
	Conf.					Overall
Team	W		L		T	W		L		T
No. 5 Georgia $	7	–	0	–	0	10	–	1	–	0
No. 3 LSU	5	–	1	–	0	9	–	2	–	0
No. 2 Ole Miss #	5	–	1	–	0	10	–	1	–	0
No. 10 Alabama	4	–	1	–	2	7	–	2	–	2
Auburn	4	–	3	–	0	7	–	3	–	0
Vanderbilt	3	–	2	–	2	5	–	3	–	2
Georgia Tech	3	–	3	–	0	6	–	5	–	0
Tennessee	3	–	4	–	1	5	–	4	–	1
No. 19 Florida	2	–	4	–	0	5	–	4	–	1
Kentucky	1	–	6	–	0	4	–	6	–	0
Tulane	0	–	5	–	1	3	–	6	–	1
Mississippi State	0	–	7	–	0	2	–	7	–	0
$ – Conference champion; ^{#} Berryman, Billingsley, Dunkel, Sagarin national champion; Rankings from AP Poll

The 1959 Ole Miss Rebels football team represented the University of Mississippi during the 1959 college football season. Ole Miss finished the season with an overall record of ten wins and one loss (10–1), tied for second in the Southeastern Conference (SEC) and with a victory over LSU in the Sugar Bowl. The team gave up only 21 points all season, and were retroactively named national champions by Berryman, Billingsley, Dunkel and Sagarin. Syracuse was crowned as the national champion by both the AP and the UPI wire services. The team was later rated the third best squad from 1956 to 1995 by Sagarin.

== Schedule ==
Date	Opponent	Rank	Site	Result	Attendance	Source
September 19	at Houston*	No. 8	Rice Stadium; Houston, TX	W 16–0	45,000	
September 26	at Kentucky	No. 4	McLean Stadium; Lexington, KY	W 16–0	33,000	
October 3	No. 11 (small) Memphis State*	No. 3	Hemingway Stadium; Oxford, MS (rivalry)	W 43–0	12,500	
October 10	at Vanderbilt	No. 5	Dudley Field; Nashville, TN (rivalry)	W 33–0	25,000	
October 17	Tulane	No. 5	Hemingway Stadium; Oxford, MS (rivalry)	W 53–7	23,500	
October 24	vs. No. 10 Arkansas*	No. 4	Crump Stadium; Memphis, TN (rivalry)	W 28–0	32,004	
October 31	at No. 1 LSU	No. 3	Tiger Stadium; Baton Rouge, LA (rivalry)	L 3–7	67,327	
November 7	No. 18 (small) Chattanooga*	No. 5	Hemingway Stadium; Oxford, MS	W 58–0	14,500	
November 14	vs. No. 9 Tennessee	No. 5	Crump Stadium; Memphis, TN (rivalry)	W 37–7	32,515	
November 28	at Mississippi State	No. 2	Scott Field; Starkville, MS (Egg Bowl)	W 42–0	34,000	
January 1, 1960	vs. No. 3 LSU*	No. 2	Tulane Stadium; New Orleans, LA (Sugar Bowl)	W 21–0	81,141	
*Non-conference game; Rankings from AP Poll released prior to the game

== Roster ==
- QB Bobby Franklin
- E Johnny Brewer
- G/PK Robert Khayat
- DB Billy Brewer
- HB Cowboy Woodruff
