= 1959 Georgia Bulldogs football team =

American college football season

1959 Georgia Bulldogs football

SEC champion Orange Bowl champion

Orange Bowl, W 14–0 vs. Missouri
- Conference: Southeastern Conference

Ranking
- Coaches: No. 5
- AP: No. 5
- Record: 10–1 (7–0 SEC)
- Head coach: Wally Butts (21st season)
- Home stadium: Sanford Stadium

1959 Southeastern Conference football standings
	Conf.					Overall
Team	W		L		T	W		L		T
No. 5 Georgia $	7	–	0	–	0	10	–	1	–	0
No. 3 LSU	5	–	1	–	0	9	–	2	–	0
No. 2 Ole Miss #	5	–	1	–	0	10	–	1	–	0
No. 10 Alabama	4	–	1	–	2	7	–	2	–	2
Auburn	4	–	3	–	0	7	–	3	–	0
Vanderbilt	3	–	2	–	2	5	–	3	–	2
Georgia Tech	3	–	3	–	0	6	–	5	–	0
Tennessee	3	–	4	–	1	5	–	4	–	1
No. 19 Florida	2	–	4	–	0	5	–	4	–	1
Kentucky	1	–	6	–	0	4	–	6	–	0
Tulane	0	–	5	–	1	3	–	6	–	1
Mississippi State	0	–	7	–	0	2	–	7	–	0
$ – Conference champion; ^{#} Berryman, Billingsley, Dunkel, Sagarin national champion; Rankings from AP Poll

The 1959 Georgia Bulldogs football team represented the University of Georgia as a member of the Southeastern Conference (SEC) during the 1959 college football season. Led by 21st-year head coach Wally Butts, the Bulldogs compiled an overall record of 10–1 with a mark of 7–0 in conference play, and finished as SEC champion.

The Bulldogs won nine games in the regular season and lost only once, an early-season non-conference loss to South Carolina. Georgia's perfect conference record of 7–0, combined with conference losses by pre-season favorites LSU and Ole Miss, was enough to give the Bulldogs the Southeastern Conference championship. They also earned a trip to the Orange Bowl, where they defeated Missouri 14–0.

The highlight of the regular season was a come-from-behind win over Auburn to clinch the championship. Trailing the Tigers 13–7 with less than 40 seconds left in the game, The Bulldogs scored on a fourth-down fourteen-yard touchdown pass from quarterback Fran Tarkenton to End Bill Herron. Kicker Durward Pennington converted the extra point and Georgia won the game by a score of 14–13.

== Schedule ==
Date	Opponent	Rank	Site	TV	Result	Attendance	Source
September 19	Alabama		Sanford Stadium; Athens, GA (rivalry)		W 17–3	40,000	
September 26	Vanderbilt	No. 17	Sanford Stadium; Athens, GA (rivalry)		W 21–6	31,000	
October 3	at No. 16 South Carolina*	No. 13	Carolina Stadium; Columbia, SC (rivalry)		L 14–30	27,000	
October 10	Hardin–Simmons*		Sanford Stadium; Athens, GA		W 35–6	25,000	
October 17	vs. Mississippi State		Grant Field; Atlanta, GA		W 15–0	25,000	
October 24	at Kentucky		McLean Stadium; Lexington, KY		W 14–7	25,000	
October 31	Florida State*^{†}	No. 14	Sanford Stadium; Athens, GA		W 42–0	30,000	
November 7	vs. Florida	No. 11	Gator Bowl Stadium; Jacksonville, FL (rivalry)		W 21–10	40,000	
November 14	No. 8 Auburn	No. 12	Sanford Stadium; Athens, GA (rivalry)		W 14–13	50,000	
November 28	at Georgia Tech	No. 6	Grant Field; Atlanta, GA (rivalry)		W 21–14	44,000	
January 1, 1960	vs. No. 18 Missouri*	No. 5	Miami Orange Bowl; Miami, FL (Orange Bowl)	CBS	W 14–0	75,280	
*Non-conference game; ^{†}Homecoming; Rankings from AP Poll released prior to the game

== Roster ==
- QB Fran Tarkenton, Jr.
- G Pat Dye
- HB Fred Brown Jr.
- HB/P Bobby Walden Jr.-
- K Durward Pennington Soph.
- FB Bill Godfrey Soph.
- E Jimmy Vickers
- E Aaron Box
- E Bill Herron
- QB Charley Britt Sr.
- C 'Dude' Thompson Sr.
- Fred Farah Sr.
- G Billy Roland
- HB Don Soberdash Sr. (Team Captain)
