= Maxie Baughan =

American football player and coach (1938–2023)

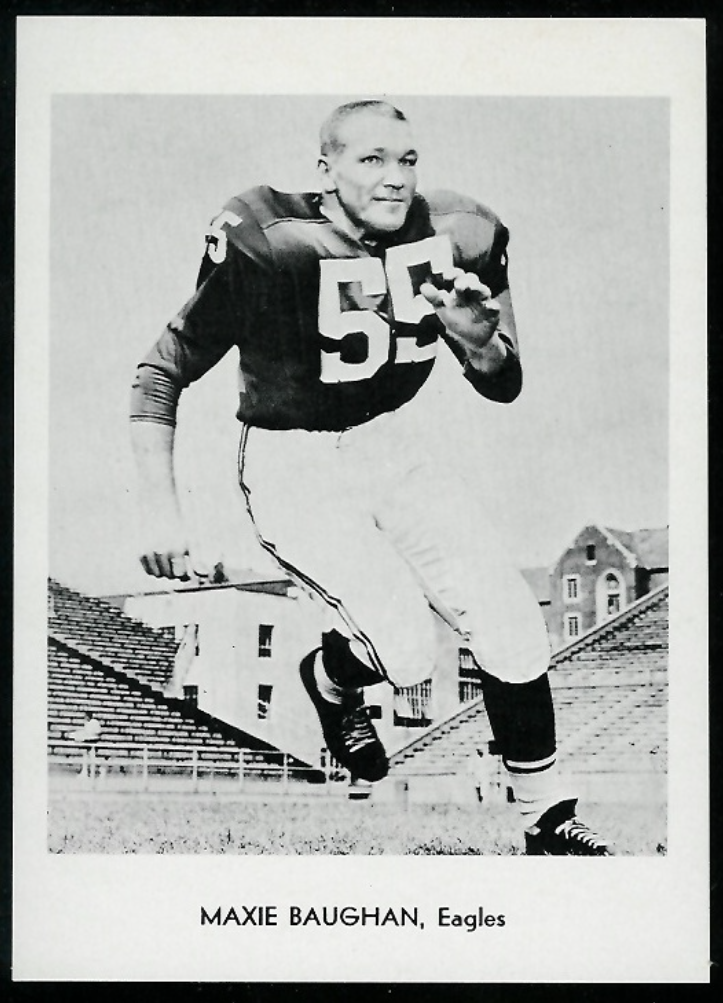
- Baughan in 1960

No. 55, 50
- Position: Linebacker

Personal information
- Born: August 3, 1938; Forkland, Alabama, U.S.
- Died: August 19, 2023 (aged 85); Ithaca, New York, U.S.
- Listed height: 6 ft 1 in (1.85 m)
- Listed weight: 227 lb (103 kg)

Career information
- High school: Bessemer City (Bessemer, Alabama)
- College: Georgia Tech (1957–1959)
- NFL draft: 1960: 2nd round, 20th overall pick
- AFL draft: 1960: 1st round

Career history

Playing
- Philadelphia Eagles (1960–1965); Los Angeles Rams (1966–1970); Washington Redskins (1974)

Coaching
- Georgia Tech (1972–1973) Defensive coordinator; Baltimore Colts (1975–1979) Defensive coordinator; Detroit Lions (1980–1982) Defensive coordinator; Cornell (1983–1988) Head coach; Minnesota Vikings (1990–1991) Linebackers coach; Tampa Bay Buccaneers (1992–1995) Linebackers coach; Baltimore Ravens (1996–1998) Linebackers coach

Awards and highlights
- NFL champion (1960); 1× First-team All-Pro (1964); 5× Second-team All-Pro (1965–1969); 9× Pro Bowl (1960, 1961, 1963–1969); Philadelphia Eagles Hall of Fame; Consensus All-American (1959); SEC Lineman of the Year (1959); First-team All-SEC (1959)

Career NFL statistics
- Sacks: 24.5
- Fumble recoveries: 10
- Interceptions: 18
- Interception yards: 218
- Defensive touchdowns: 1
- Stats at Pro Football Reference

Head coaching record
- Career: 28–29–2 (.492)
- Coaching profile at Pro Football Reference
- College Football Hall of Fame

Maxie Callaway Baughan Jr. (August 3, 1938 – August 19, 2023) was an American professional football player and coach in the National Football League (NFL). Baughan played linebacker for the Philadelphia Eagles, Los Angeles Rams, and Washington Redskins. He later served as a linebacker coach and defensive coordinator for several college and NFL teams. Baughan played college football for the Georgia Tech Yellow Jackets.

== Early life and education ==
After attending Bessemer City High School in Alabama, Baughan played college football for the Georgia Tech Yellow Jackets from 1957 to 1959. While at Georgia Tech, he played and started at both linebacker and center. In 1959, he was Georgia Tech's captain, a consensus All-American, the Southeastern Conference Lineman of the Year, and the Most Valuable Player in the 1960 Gator Bowl. He set a Georgia Tech single-season record with 124 tackles.

== Professional career ==
Baughan was selected in the second round (20th overall) of the 1960 NFL draft by the Philadelphia Eagles, additionally being chosen as a first-round pick in the 1960 AFL draft by the Oakland Raiders. He joined the Eagles and became a starter immediately at the rightside linebacker position, starting nine of 12 games in his rookie season as the Eagles went on to win the 1960 NFL Championship over the Green Bay Packers, which remained the team's last league title until Super Bowl LII in the 2017 season. He was chosen to his first Pro Bowl that year, posting three interceptions in the game, and was also the runner-up for the NFL's rookie of the year award. He went on to play the following 10 years in the NFL and was an All-Pro selection in seven of those years. Baughan played his first six years with the Eagles and earned Pro Bowl selection in all but one of those years. During a game against the Pittsburgh Steelers in 1965, he helped the Eagles set a team record with nine interceptions in the 47–13 win, with six of those points coming off an interception by Baughan which he returned for the only score of his career.

By 1966, the number of games the Eagles won had sharply declined and Baughan decided that he wanted out of Philadelphia. However, George Allen, who was entering his first season as an NFL head coach with the Los Angeles Rams, won the right to Baughan's services by sending two players (linebacker Fred Brown and defensive tackle Frank Molden) to the Eagles in return. Baughan and Allen would develop a strong relationship, spending extensive time studying game film together. Baughan would later state that he learned more about football from Allen than anyone else. Baughan was chosen to be the Rams' defensive captain and was in charge of signal calling for the unit. He was selected for the Pro Bowl in each of his first four seasons with the Rams and was also a first-team All-Pro choice three times. After an injury-plagued 1970 season, in which he played in only 10 games, Baughan retired from the NFL.

Baughan's contractual rights were traded along with Jack Pardee, Myron Pottios, Diron Talbert, John Wilbur, Jeff Jordan, and a 1971 fifth-round pick (124th overall—traded to Green Bay Packers for Boyd Dowler) from the Rams to the Washington Redskins for Marlin McKeever, first and third rounders in 1971 (10th and 63rd overall—Isiah Robertson and Dave Elmendorf respectively) and third, fourth, fifth, sixth and seventh rounders in 1972 (73rd, 99th, 125th, 151st and 177th overall—to New England Patriots, traded to Philadelphia Eagles for Joe Carollo, Bob Christiansen, Texas Southern defensive tackle Eddie Herbert and to New York Giants respectively) on January 28, 1971.

In 1974, Allen, now the head coach of the Redskins, talked Baughan into a brief return to the NFL as a player-coach. He appeared in two games, mainly as a backup to Chris Hanburger. At the conclusion of that season, Baughan retired. He finished with 18 interceptions (including one returned for a touchdown) and 10 fumble recoveries in 147 games played; Baughan also unofficially posted 24.5 sacks.

== Coaching career ==
After retiring from the NFL, Baughan served as the defensive coordinator at his alma mater, Georgia Tech, from 1972 to 1973. Following his brief return to playing in 1974, he went back into coaching by becoming the defensive coordinator for the Baltimore Colts in 1975. During his time with the Colts, the team won three straight AFC East divisional championships from 1975 to 1977. He left the Colts in 1980 and then served through 1982 as the linebackers coach and defensive coordinator with the Detroit Lions.

Baughan was named head coach of the Cornell Big Red college football team in 1983. He led them to the Ivy League championship in 1988, their first since 1971. However, he was forced to resign before the next season after information surfaced about an affair he had with an assistant coach's wife. Baughan then coached a team in Japan in 1989 before returning to the NFL in 1990 as linebackers coach of the Minnesota Vikings. Following two years with Minnesota, he coached the linebackers for the Tampa Bay Buccaneers from 1992 to 1995, and then served in that same role with the Baltimore Ravens from 1996 until retiring after 1998.

== Death ==
Baughan died in Ithaca, New York, on August 19, 2023, at the age of 85. On December 3, 2024, his family announced through the Concussion Legacy Foundation that Baughan had stage 3 CTE.

== Honors ==
Baughan was inducted into the Georgia Tech Hall of Fame in 1965 and the College Football Hall of Fame in 1988. He was also inducted into the Georgia Sports Hall of Fame in 1980, the Alabama Sports Hall of Fame in 1983, the Philadelphia Sports Hall of Fame in 2012, and the Gator Bowl Hall of Fame.

Despite his NFL accomplishments, Baughan has not been elected to the Pro Football Hall of Fame. Several sources have considered him among the best players not inducted. In 2005, he was named to the Professional Football Researchers Association's Hall of Very Good in the association's third HOVG class, an honor for the best players not in the Pro Football Hall of Fame. He was reportedly a favorite among Hall of Fame selectors for the class of 2020, but was not elected. He was also a finalist for the classes of 2023 and 2024, but missed selection both times. As of December 2024, he is again a finalist for the senior class of 2025.

In 2012, Baughan received the Outstanding Eagle Scout Award from the National Eagle Scout Association of the Boy Scouts of America. Baughan was inducted into the Philadelphia Eagles Hall of Fame on October 19, 2015, during the team's Monday Night Football game against the New York Giants.

== Head coaching record ==
Year	Team	Overall	Conference	Standing	Bowl/playoffs
Cornell Big Red (Ivy League) (1983–1988)
1983	Cornell	3–6–1	3–3–1	5th	
1984	Cornell	2–7	2–5	T–6th	
1985	Cornell	3–7	2–5	7th	
1986	Cornell	8–2	6–1	2nd	
1987	Cornell	5–5	4–3	T–4th	
1988	Cornell	7–2–1	6–1	T–1st	
Cornell:		28–29–2	23–18–1		
Total:		28–29–2			
National championship Conference title Conference division title or championship game berth

== See also ==
- List of NFL players with chronic traumatic encephalopathy
