= 1967 VMI Keydets football team =

American college football season

1967 VMI Keydets football
- Conference: Southern Conference
- Record: 6–4 (2–3 SoCon)
- Head coach: Vito Ragazzo (2nd season)
- Home stadium: Alumni Memorial Field

1967 Southern Conference football standings
	Conf.					Overall
Team	W		L		T	W		L		T
West Virginia $	4	–	0	–	1	5	–	4	–	1
East Carolina	4	–	1	–	0	8	–	2	–	0
Richmond	5	–	2	–	0	5	–	5	–	0
William & Mary	2	–	2	–	1	5	–	4	–	0
VMI	2	–	3	–	0	6	–	4	–	0
Furman	2	–	3	–	0	5	–	5	–	0
The Citadel	2	–	4	–	0	5	–	5	–	0
Davidson	1	–	5	–	0	4	–	5	–	0
$ – Conference champion; West Virginia's game against Villanova and Furman's game against Lehigh counted in the conference standings.

The 1967 VMI Keydets football team was an American football team that represented the Virginia Military Institute (VMI) as a member of the Southern Conference (SoCon) during the 1967 NCAA University Division football season. In their second year under head coach Vito Ragazzo, the team compiled an overall record of 6–4 with a mark of 2–3 in conference play, placing tied for fifth in the SoCon.

== Schedule ==
Date	Opponent	Site	Result	Attendance	Source
September 16	Davidson	Alumni Memorial Field; Lexington, VA	W 46–21		
September 23	at West Virginia	Mountaineer Field; Morgantown, WV	L 9–21	28,000	
September 30	Richmond	Alumni Memorial Field; Lexington, VA (rivalry)	L 0–3	6,400	
October 7	vs. William & Mary	City Stadium; Richmond, VA (Tobacco Bowl, rivalry)	L 28–33	18,000	
October 14	vs. The Citadel	Victory Stadium; Roanoke, VA (Harvest Bowl, rivalry)	W 22–11	10,000	
October 21	at No. 8 Georgia*	Sanford Stadium; Athens, GA	L 6–56	50,307	
October 28	at Virginia*	Scott Stadium; Charlottesville, VA	W 18–13	18,500	
November 4	Akron*	Alumni Memorial Field; Lexington, VA	W 38–14	4,800	
November 11	at Boston College*	Alumni Stadium; Chestnut Hill, MA	W 26–13	14,500	
November 23	vs. Virginia Tech*	Victory Stadium; Roanoke, VA (rivalry)	W 12–10	20,000	
*Non-conference game; Rankings from AP Poll released prior to the game
