= 1967 Richmond Spiders football team =

American college football season

1967 Richmond Spiders football
- Conference: Southern Conference
- Record: 5–5 (5–2 SoCon)
- Head coach: Frank Jones (2nd season)
- Home stadium: City Stadium

1967 Southern Conference football standings
	Conf.					Overall
Team	W		L		T	W		L		T
West Virginia $	4	–	0	–	1	5	–	4	–	1
East Carolina	4	–	1	–	0	8	–	2	–	0
Richmond	5	–	2	–	0	5	–	5	–	0
William & Mary	2	–	2	–	1	5	–	4	–	0
VMI	2	–	3	–	0	6	–	4	–	0
Furman	2	–	3	–	0	5	–	5	–	0
The Citadel	2	–	4	–	0	5	–	5	–	0
Davidson	1	–	5	–	0	4	–	5	–	0
$ – Conference champion; West Virginia's game against Villanova and Furman's game against Lehigh counted in the conference standings.

The 1967 Richmond Spiders football team was an American football team that represented the University of Richmond as a member of the Southern Conference (SoCon) during the 1967 NCAA University Division football season. In their second season under head coach Frank Jones, Richmond compiled a 5–5 record, with a mark of 5–2 in conference play, finishing in third place in the SoCon.

== Schedule ==
Date	Opponent	Site	Result	Attendance	Source
September 16	West Virginia	City Stadium; Richmond, VA	L 6–27	7,000	
September 23	East Carolina	City Stadium; Richmond, VA	L 7–23	8,000	
September 30	at VMI	Alumni Memorial Field; Lexington, VA (rivalry)	W 3–0	6,400	
October 7	at Davidson	Richardson Stadium; Davidson, NC	W 24–17	5,100	
October 14	at Furman	Sirrine Stadium; Greenville, SC	W 42–14	6,200	
October 21	at Virginia Tech*	Lane Stadium; Blacksburg, VA	L 14–45	27,322	
November 4	at Southern Miss*	Faulkner Field; Hattiesburg, MS	L 7–19	12,000	
November 11	The Citadel	City Stadium; Richmond, VA	W 20–3	10,000	
November 18	at William & Mary	Cary Field; Williamsburg, VA (rivalry)	W 16–7	13,000	
November 26	at Parsons*	Blum Stadium; Fairfield, IA	L 0–23	3,000	
*Non-conference game
