= 1967 East Carolina Pirates football team =

American college football season

1967 East Carolina Pirates football
- Conference: Southern Conference
- Record: 8–2 (4–1 SoCon)
- Head coach: Clarence Stasavich (6th season)
- Home stadium: Ficklen Memorial Stadium

1967 Southern Conference football standings
	Conf.					Overall
Team	W		L		T	W		L		T
West Virginia $	4	–	0	–	1	5	–	4	–	1
East Carolina	4	–	1	–	0	8	–	2	–	0
Richmond	5	–	2	–	0	5	–	5	–	0
William & Mary	2	–	2	–	1	5	–	4	–	0
VMI	2	–	3	–	0	6	–	4	–	0
Furman	2	–	3	–	0	5	–	5	–	0
The Citadel	2	–	4	–	0	5	–	5	–	0
Davidson	1	–	5	–	0	4	–	5	–	0
$ – Conference champion; West Virginia's game against Villanova and Furman's game against Lehigh counted in the conference standings.

The 1967 East Carolina Pirates football team was an American football team that represented East Carolina University as a member of the Southern Conference during the 1967 NCAA University Division football season. In their sixth season under head coach Clarence Stasavich, the team compiled a 8–2 record.

== Schedule ==
Date	Opponent	Site	Result	Attendance	Source
September 16	at William & Mary	Cary Field; Williamsburg, VA	W 27–7	4,000	
September 23	at Richmond	City Stadium; Richmond, VA	W 23–7	8,000	
September 30	at Davidson	Richardson Stadium; Davidson, NC	W 42–17	9,700	
October 7	Southern Illinois*	Ficklen Memorial Stadium; Greenville, NC	W 21–8	14,500	
October 14	Louisville*	Ficklen Memorial Stadium; Greenville, NC	W 18–13	11,118–11,181	
October 21	at Parsons*	Blum Stadium; Fairfield, IA	W 27–26	9,000	
October 28	The Citadel	Ficklen Memorial Stadium; Greenville, NC	L 19–21	17,211	
November 4	Furman	Ficklen Memorial Stadium; Greenville, NC	W 34–29	9,123	
November 11	West Texas State*	Ficklen Memorial Stadium; Greenville, NC	L 13–37	12,553	
November 18	at Marshall*	Fairfield Stadium; Huntington, WV (rivalry)	W 29–13	4,500	
*Non-conference game
