= 1967 The Citadel Bulldogs football team =

American college football season

1967 The Citadel Bulldogs football
- Conference: Southern Conference
- Record: 5–5 (2–4 SoCon)
- Head coach: Red Parker (2nd season)
- Home stadium: Johnson Hagood Stadium

1967 Southern Conference football standings
	Conf.					Overall
Team	W		L		T	W		L		T
West Virginia $	4	–	0	–	1	5	–	4	–	1
East Carolina	4	–	1	–	0	8	–	2	–	0
Richmond	5	–	2	–	0	5	–	5	–	0
William & Mary	2	–	2	–	1	5	–	4	–	0
VMI	2	–	3	–	0	6	–	4	–	0
Furman	2	–	3	–	0	5	–	5	–	0
The Citadel	2	–	4	–	0	5	–	5	–	0
Davidson	1	–	5	–	0	4	–	5	–	0
$ – Conference champion; West Virginia's game against Villanova and Furman's game against Lehigh counted in the conference standings.

The 1967 The Citadel Bulldogs football team represented The Citadel, The Military College of South Carolina in the 1967 NCAA University Division football season. Red Parker served as head coach for the second season. The Bulldogs played as members of the Southern Conference and played home games at Johnson Hagood Stadium.

== Schedule ==
Date	Time	Opponent	Site	Result	Attendance	Source
September 16		Southern Miss*	Johnson Hagood Stadium; Charleston, SC	L 7–10		
September 23		Wofford*	Johnson Hagood Stadium; Charleston, SC (rivalry)	W 17–7		
September 30	1:30 p.m.	vs. Maine*	Portland Stadium; Portland, ME	W 42–14	3,421	
October 7		at No. 4 Arkansas State*	War Memorial Stadium; Little Rock, AR	W 20–7	17,033	
October 14		vs. VMI	Victory Stadium; Roanoke, VA (Harvest Bowl, rivalry)	L 11–22		
October 21		Davidson	Johnson Hagood Stadium; Charleston, SC	W 28–7		
October 28		at East Carolina	Ficklen Stadium; Greenville, NC	W 21–19		
November 4		William & Mary	Johnson Hagood Stadium; Charleston, SC	L 0–24	13,821	
November 11		at Richmond	City Stadium; Richmond, VA	L 3–20	10,000	
November 18		Furman^{†}	Johnson Hagood Stadium; Charleston, SC (rivalry)	L 6–14	12,425	
*Non-conference game; ^{†}Homecoming; Rankings from AP Poll released prior to the game; All times are in Eastern time
