= 1967 West Virginia Mountaineers football team =

American college football season

1967 West Virginia Mountaineers football

SoCon champion
- Conference: Southern Conference
- Record: 5–4–1 (4–0–1 SoCon)
- Head coach: Jim Carlen (2nd season)
- Home stadium: Mountaineer Field

1967 Southern Conference football standings
	Conf.					Overall
Team	W		L		T	W		L		T
West Virginia $	4	–	0	–	1	5	–	4	–	1
East Carolina	4	–	1	–	0	8	–	2	–	0
Richmond	5	–	2	–	0	5	–	5	–	0
William & Mary	2	–	2	–	1	5	–	4	–	0
VMI	2	–	3	–	0	6	–	4	–	0
Furman	2	–	3	–	0	5	–	5	–	0
The Citadel	2	–	4	–	0	5	–	5	–	0
Davidson	1	–	5	–	0	4	–	5	–	0
$ – Conference champion; West Virginia's game against Villanova and Furman's game against Lehigh counted in the conference standings.

The 1967 West Virginia Mountaineers football team represented West Virginia University as a member of the Southern Conference (SoCon) during the 1967 NCAA University Division football season. Led by second-year head coach Jim Carlen, the Mountaineers compiled an overall record of 5–4–1 with a mark of 4–0–1 in conference play, winning the SoCon title. West Virginia played home games at Mountaineer Field in Morgantown, West Virginia.

== Schedule ==
Date	Opponent	Site	Result	Attendance	Source
September 9	Villanova (Note: West Virginia's game against Villanova counted in the SoCon standings.)	Mountaineer Field; Morgantown, WV	W 40–0	27,000	
September 16	at Richmond	City Stadium; Richmond, VA	W 27–6	7,000	
September 23	VMI	Mountaineer Field; Morgantown, WV	W 21–9	28,000	
September 30	at Syracuse*	Archbold Stadium; Syracuse, NY (rivalry)	L 6–23	28,435	
October 7	Pittsburgh*	Mountaineer Field; Morgantown, WV (Backyard Brawl)	W 15–0	35,000	
October 21	at Penn State*	Beaver Stadium; University Park, PA (rivalry)	L 14–21	43,704–44,460	
October 28	Virginia Tech*	Mountaineer Field; Morgantown, WV (rivalry)	L 7–20	31,500	
November 4	at Kentucky*	McLean Stadium; Lexington, KY	L 7–22	30,000	
November 11	William & Mary	Mountaineer Field; Morgantown, WV	T 16–16	11,500	
November 18	Davidson	Mountaineer Field; Morgantown, WV	W 35–0	12,000	
*Non-conference game
