= Harvest Bowl =

American college football game, 1958–1969

Harvest Bowl (defunct)
- Stadium: Victory Stadium
- Location: Roanoke, Virginia
- Operated: 1958–1969
- Conference tie-ins: None

Sponsors
- Junior League of Roanoke Valley

The Harvest Bowl was a college football game held at Victory Stadium in Roanoke, Virginia from 1958 to 1969. Despite its "bowl" designation, it was not a postseason game, but a regular season neutral-site contest featuring major college football programs from the state of Virginia. In addition to Virginia and Virginia Tech (then branded as VPI, after its official name, Virginia Polytechnic Institute), at the time these included William & Mary and VMI, which today compete in the NCAA Division I Football Championship Subdivision (FCS). Seven of the games featured two of these four teams, while the other five included one of them against an out-of-state rival. Five times in its twelve-year existence, the Harvest Bowl hosted the annual Virginia–Virginia Tech rivalry game. It never featured the VMI-Virginia Tech rivalry game, which at the time was played annually in Roanoke on Thanksgiving Day.

The Harvest Bowl served as Roanoke's counterpart to the more successful and longer-lasting Tobacco Bowl in Richmond, Virginia, and Oyster Bowl in Norfolk, Virginia, which were also regular season neutral-site games. The game served as the centerpiece of an annual festival weekend featuring a parade, the crowning of a bowl queen, and other community events. The Harvest Bowl was unique in its time as a men's intercollegiate athletic event run by a women's civic organization, the Junior League of Roanoke Valley.

The inaugural contest drew 24,836 fans to the 25,000-seat stadium, and attendance remained strong as long as the game featured local favorite Virginia Tech. After the construction of Lane Stadium in Blacksburg, which opened in 1965 with an initial capacity of 35,000, Virginia Tech became less interested in playing neutral-site games in Roanoke, and the Harvest Bowl lost its biggest drawing card.

Ironically, the most memorable game did not involve Virginia Tech, nor was it remembered for the action on the field. The 1967 Harvest Bowl matchup of the South's two state-run military academies, VMI and The Citadel, included "a brief but action-filled fight early in the fourth quarter" after Citadel cadets hung a derogatory bedsheet banner behind the south end zone, and a contingent of VMI cadets left the home stand to tear it down. The two corps of cadets then "poured out of the stands and took turns throwing punches at each other," forcing a stoppage in the game. "Police finally restored order and the game was completed in an orderly fashion," with VMI winning in an upset, 22–11.

Harvest Bowl attendance dwindled after 1965, and the final game in 1969 (even with Virginia Tech participating once again) drew just 6,000. In announcing the demise of the bowl in February 1970, Junior League leaders cited "insufficient ticket sales" and "increased public apathy." The twelve games combined netted $114,483 for the organization's charitable activities, the equivalent of just over $1 million in today's currency.

== Game results ==
Annual	Date	Winner		Loser		Ref.
1st	October 11, 1958	VPI	22	Virginia	13	
2nd	October 3, 1959	VPI	20	William & Mary	14	
3rd	October 22, 1960	VPI	40	Virginia	6	
4th	October 21, 1961	VPI	20	Virginia	0	
5th	October 6, 1962	VPI	20	Virginia	15	
6th	October 5, 1963	VPI	10	Virginia	0	
7th	September 26, 1964	Wake Forest	38	VPI	21	
8th	September 18, 1965	VPI	12	Wake Forest	3	
9th	September 24, 1966	Georgia	43	VMI	7	
10th	October 14, 1967	VMI	22	The Citadel	11	
11th	October 11, 1968	West Virginia	14	VMI	7	
12th	November 1, 1969	VPI	48	William & Mary	7	
