= 1967 William & Mary Indians football team =

American college football season

1967 William & Mary Indians football
- Conference: Southern Conference
- Record: 5–4–1 (2–2–1 SoCon)
- Head coach: Marv Levy (4th season)
- Captains: Adin Brown; Mike Madden
- Home stadium: Cary Field

1967 Southern Conference football standings
	Conf.					Overall
Team	W		L		T	W		L		T
West Virginia $	4	–	0	–	1	5	–	4	–	1
East Carolina	4	–	1	–	0	8	–	2	–	0
Richmond	5	–	2	–	0	5	–	5	–	0
William & Mary	2	–	2	–	1	5	–	4	–	0
VMI	2	–	3	–	0	6	–	4	–	0
Furman	2	–	3	–	0	5	–	5	–	0
The Citadel	2	–	4	–	0	5	–	5	–	0
Davidson	1	–	5	–	0	4	–	5	–	0
$ – Conference champion; West Virginia's game against Villanova and Furman's game against Lehigh counted in the conference standings.

The 1967 William & Mary Indians football team was an American football team that represented the College of William & Mary as a member of the Southern Conference (SoCon) during the 1967 NCAA University Division football season. In their fourth season under head coach Marv Levy, William & Mary compiled a 5–4–1 record, with a mark of 2–2–1 in conference play, placing fourth in the SoCon.

== Schedule ==
Date	Opponent	Site	Result	Attendance	Source
September 9	Quantico Marines*	Cary Field; Williamsburg, VA	W 38–7	7,500	
September 16	East Carolina	Cary Field; Williamsburg, VA	L 7–27	4,000	
September 23	at Virginia Tech*	Lane Stadium; Blacksburg, VA	L 7–31	23,500	
September 30	at Vanderbilt*	Dudley Field; Nashville, TN	L 12–14	14,616	
October 7	vs. VMI	City Stadium; Richmond, VA (Tobacco Bowl, rivalry)	W 33–28	18,000	
October 14	at Ohio*	Peden Stadium; Athens, OH	W 25–22	18,300	
October 21	at Navy*	Navy–Marine Corps Memorial Stadium; Annapolis, MD	W 27–16	19,542	
November 4	at The Citadel	Johnson Hagood Stadium; Charleston, SC	W 24–0	13,821	
November 11	West Virginia	Cary Field; Williamsburg, VA	T 16–16	11,500	
November 18	Richmond	Cary Field; Williamsburg, VA (rivalry)	L 7–16	13,000	
*Non-conference game

== NFL draft selections ==
= Pro Football Hall of Fame	= Canadian Football Hall of Fame	= College Football Hall of Fame

#	Year	Round	Pick	Overall	Name	Team	Position
4	1968	13	9	336	Dan Darragh	Buffalo Bills	Quarterback
5	1968	16	4	412	Adin Brown	Denver Broncos	Linebacker
