= 1967 Davidson Wildcats football team =

American college football season

1967 Davidson Wildcats football
- Conference: Southern Conference
- Record: 4–5 (1–5 SoCon)
- Head coach: Homer Smith (3rd season)
- Home stadium: Richardson Stadium

1967 Southern Conference football standings
	Conf.					Overall
Team	W		L		T	W		L		T
West Virginia $	4	–	0	–	1	5	–	4	–	1
East Carolina	4	–	1	–	0	8	–	2	–	0
Richmond	5	–	2	–	0	5	–	5	–	0
William & Mary	2	–	2	–	1	5	–	4	–	0
VMI	2	–	3	–	0	6	–	4	–	0
Furman	2	–	3	–	0	5	–	5	–	0
The Citadel	2	–	4	–	0	5	–	5	–	0
Davidson	1	–	5	–	0	4	–	5	–	0
$ – Conference champion; West Virginia's game against Villanova and Furman's game against Lehigh counted in the conference standings.

The 1967 Davidson Wildcats football team represented Davidson College as a member of the Southern Conference (SoCon) during the 1967 NCAA University Division football season. Led by third-year head coach Homer Smith, the Wildcats compiled an overall record of 4–5 with a mark of 1–5 in conference play, placing last out of eight teams in the SoCon.

== Schedule ==
Date	Opponent	Site	Result	Attendance	Source
September 16	at VMI	Alumni Memorial Field; Lexington, VA	L 21–46		
September 23	at Furman	Sirrine Stadium; Greenville, SC	W 45–22		
September 30	East Carolina	Richardson Stadium; Davidson, NC	L 17–42	9,700	
October 7	Richmond	Richardson Stadium; Davidson, NC	L 17–24	5,100	
October 14	Presbyterian*^{†}	Richardson Stadium; Davidson, NC	W 38–0	8,700	
October 21	at The Citadel	Johnson Hagood Stadium; Charleston, SC	L 7–28		
October 28	at Connecticut*	Memorial Stadium; Storrs, CT	W 38–18		
November 11	Wofford*	Richardson Stadium; Davidson, NC	W 30–7		
November 18	at West Virginia	Mountaineer Field; Morgantown, WV	L 0–35	12,000	
*Non-conference game; ^{†}Homecoming
