= 1967 UMass Redmen football team =

American college football season

1967 UMass Redmen football

Yankee Conference champion
- Conference: Yankee Conference
- Record: 7–2 (5–0 Yankee)
- Head coach: Vic Fusia (7th season)
- Home stadium: Alumni Stadium

1967 Yankee Conference football standings
	Conf.					Overall
Team	W		L		T	W		L		T
UMass $	5	–	0	–	0	7	–	2	–	0
Connecticut	4	–	1	–	0	5	–	4	–	0
Rhode Island	2	–	2	–	1	6	–	2	–	1
New Hampshire	2	–	3	–	0	5	–	3	–	0
Vermont	1	–	3	–	1	3	–	5	–	1
Maine	0	–	5	–	0	0	–	8	–	0
$ – Conference champion

The 1967 UMass Redmen football team represented the University of Massachusetts Amherst in the 1967 NCAA College Division football season as a member of the Yankee Conference. The team was coached by Vic Fusia and played its home games at Alumni Stadium in Hadley, Massachusetts. UMass finished the season with a record of 7–2 overall and 5–0 in conference play, repeating as conference champions.

Senior quarterback Greg Landry was selected by the Detroit Lions in the first round of the 1968 NFL/AFL draft (eleventh overall), the first QB taken.

== Schedule ==
Date	Opponent	Site	Result	Attendance	Source
September 23	at Maine	Alumni Field; Orono, ME	W 30–9	7,254–7,500	
September 30	Dartmouth*	Alumni Stadium; Hadley, MA	L 10–28	18,100	
October 14	at Connecticut	Memorial Stadium; Storrs, CT (rivalry)	W 35–14	11,009	
October 21	Rhode Island	Alumni Stadium; Hadley, MA	W 28–24	16,100	
October 28	at Boston University*	Nickerson Field; Boston, MA	W 24–0	10,000	
November 4	Vermont	Alumni Stadium; Hadley, MA	W 21–0	8,000	
November 11	at Rutgers*	Rutgers Stadium; Piscataway, NJ	W 30–7	13,000	
November 18	at New Hampshire	Cowell Stadium; Durham, NH (rivalry)	W 14–13	10,500	
November 25	at Boston College*	Alumni Stadium; Chestnut Hill, MA (rivalry)	L 0–25	16,200	
*Non-conference game
