= 1967 Connecticut Huskies football team =

American college football season

1967 Connecticut Huskies football
- Conference: Yankee Conference
- Record: 5–4 (4–1 Yankee)
- Head coach: John Toner (2nd season)
- Home stadium: Memorial Stadium

1967 Yankee Conference football standings
	Conf.					Overall
Team	W		L		T	W		L		T
UMass $	5	–	0	–	0	7	–	2	–	0
Connecticut	4	–	1	–	0	5	–	4	–	0
Rhode Island	2	–	2	–	1	6	–	2	–	1
New Hampshire	2	–	3	–	0	5	–	3	–	0
Vermont	1	–	3	–	1	3	–	5	–	1
Maine	0	–	5	–	0	0	–	8	–	0
$ – Conference champion

The 1967 Connecticut Huskies football team represented the University of Connecticut in the 1967 NCAA College Division football season. The Huskies were led by second-year head coach John Toner, and completed the season with a record of 5–4.

== Schedule ==
Date	Opponent	Site	Result	Attendance	Source
September 30	at Vermont	Centennial Field; Burlington, VT	W 17–6	7,000–7,800	
October 6	at Yale*	Yale Bowl; New Haven, CT	L 6–14	31,621	
October 14	UMass	Memorial Stadium; Storrs, CT (rivalry)	L 14–35	11,009	
October 21	at Maine	Alumni Field; Orono, ME	W 21–0	3,608	
October 28	Davidson*	Memorial Stadium; Storrs, CT	L 18–38	11,017	
November 4	New Hampshire	Memorial Stadium; Storrs, CT	W 20–19	8,178	
November 11	at Boston University*	Nickerson Field; Boston, MA	L 12–21	4,000	
November 18	at Rhode Island	Meade Stadium; Kingston, RI (rivalry)	W 26–18	8,000	
November 25	Holy Cross*	Memorial Stadium; Storrs, CT	W 3–0	3,655	
*Non-conference game
