= 1967 Temple Owls football team =

American college football season

1967 Temple Owls football

MAC University Division champion
- Conference: Middle Atlantic Conference
- University Division
- Record: 7–2 (4–0 MAC)
- Head coach: George Makris (8th season)
- Captain: Game captains
- Home stadium: Temple Stadium

1967 Middle Atlantic Conference football standings
	Conf.					Overall
Team	W		L		T	W		L		T
University Division
Temple x	4	–	0	–	0	7	–	2	–	0
Hofstra	3	–	1	–	0	8	–	2	–	0
Bucknell	3	–	2	–	0	4	–	6	–	0
Gettysburg	2	–	3	–	0	4	–	5	–	0
Delaware	2	–	3	–	0	2	–	7	–	0
Lafayette	2	–	3	–	0	4	–	5	–	0
Lehigh	0	–	4	–	0	1	–	8	–	0
West Chester *	0	–	0	–	0	9	–	0	–	0
Northern College Division
Wilkes x	8	–	0	–	0	8	–	0	–	0
Wagner x	5	–	0	–	0	9	–	0	–	0
Juniata x	5	–	0	–	0	7	–	1	–	0
Delaware Valley	5	–	2	–	0	6	–	2	–	0
Albright	4	–	3	–	0	5	–	4	–	0
Upsala	4	–	4	–	0	4	–	4	–	0
Lycoming	3	–	5	–	0	3	–	5	–	0
Moravian	3	–	6	–	0	3	–	6	–	0
Susquehanna *	0	–	3	–	0	1	–	8	–	0
Southern College Division
Johns Hopkins x	6	–	0	–	0	6	–	1	–	0
Western Maryland	3	–	2	–	0	6	–	3	–	0
Franklin & Marshall	4	–	3	–	0	4	–	4	–	0
Swarthmore	3	–	5	–	0	3	–	5	–	0
Lebanon Valley	3	–	5	–	0	3	–	5	–	0
Dickinson	3	–	5	–	0	3	–	5	–	0
Pennsylvania Military	3	–	5	–	0	3	–	6	–	0
Haverford	2	–	4	–	0	2	–	5	–	0
Muhlenberg	2	–	5	–	1	2	–	5	–	1
Ursinus	1	–	6	–	1	1	–	6	–	1
Drexel	1	–	5	–	0	3	–	5	–	0
x – Division champion/co-champions; * – Ineligible for championship due to insufficient conference games

The 1967 Temple Owls football team was an American football team that represented Temple University during the 1967 NCAA College Division football season. Temple won the championship of the Middle Atlantic Conference, University Division.

In its eighth season under head coach George Makris, the team compiled a 7–2 record, 4–0 against MAC opponents. The team played its home games at Temple Stadium in Philadelphia. John Konstantinos, John McAneney, and Jerry Prescutti were assistant coaches.

Sophomore halfback Mike Busch set Temple single-game records with 38 carries and 176 rushing yards in the team's November 4 victory over Bucknell. In addition, end Jim Callahan broke Andy Tomasic's Temple career scoring records with 22 touchdowns and 132 points.

== Schedule ==
Date	Opponent	Site	Result	Attendance	Source
September 23	at Merchant Marine*	Tomb Field; Kings Point, NY	W 18–12	3,000	
September 30	Boston University*	Temple Stadium; Philadelphia, PA	W 22–16	10,000	
October 7	at Buffalo*	Rotary Field; Buffalo, NY	L 14–44	9,275	
October 14	No. 9 Hofstra	Temple Stadium; Philadelphia, PA	W 35–23	10,500	
October 21	at Dayton*	Baujan Field; Dayton, OH	L 6–56	14,208	
October 28	at Delaware	Delaware Stadium; Newark, DE	W 26–17	13,255	
November 4	at Bucknell	Memorial Stadium; Lewisburg, PA	W 13–8	8,500	
November 11	Gettysburg	Temple Stadium; Philadelphia, PA	W 45–27	11,000	
November 18	Akron*	Temple Stadium; Philadelphia, PA	W 22–21	5,000	
*Non-conference game; Rankings from UPI Poll released prior to the game
