= 1967 Vermont Catamounts football team =

American college football season

1967 Vermont Catamounts football
- Conference: Yankee Conference
- Record: 3–5–1 (1–3–1 Yankee)
- Head coach: Bob Clifford (6th season)
- Home stadium: Centennial Field

1967 Yankee Conference football standings
	Conf.					Overall
Team	W		L		T	W		L		T
UMass $	5	–	0	–	0	7	–	2	–	0
Connecticut	4	–	1	–	0	5	–	4	–	0
Rhode Island	2	–	2	–	1	6	–	2	–	1
New Hampshire	2	–	3	–	0	5	–	3	–	0
Vermont	1	–	3	–	1	3	–	5	–	1
Maine	0	–	5	–	0	0	–	8	–	0
$ – Conference champion

The 1967 Vermont Catamounts football team was an American football team that represented the University of Vermont in the Yankee Conference during the 1967 NCAA College Division football season. In their sixth year under head coach Bob Clifford, the team compiled a 3–5–1 record.

== Schedule ==
Date	Opponent	Site	Result	Attendance	Source
September 23	at American International*	Miller Field; Springfield, MA	L 25–37	3,000	
September 30	Connecticut	Centennial Field; Burlington, VT	L 6–17	7,000	
October 7	Maine	Centennial Field; Burlington, VT	W 18–7	8,000	
October 14	Rhode Island	Centennial Field; Burlington, VT	T 0–0	6,500	
October 21	at New Hampshire	Cowell Stadium; Durham, NH	L 6–30	10,000–13,500	
October 28	Norwich*	Centennial Field; Burlington, VT	W 20–19	7,000	
November 4	at UMass	Alumni Stadium; Hadley, MA	L 0–21	8,000	
November 11	at Middlebury*	Porter Field; Middlebury, VT	W 7–21	4,000	
November 18	C. W. Post*	Centennial Field; Burlington, VT	L 0–7	2,500	
*Non-conference game

== After the season ==
The following Catamount was selected in the 1968 NFL/AFL draft after the season.

Round	Pick	Player	Position	AFL club
15	386	Jeff Kuhman	Linebacker	Denver Broncos
