= 1967 Rhode Island Rams football team =

American college football season

1967 Rhode Island Rams football
- Conference: Yankee Conference
- Record: 6–2–1 (2–2–1 Yankee)
- Head coach: Jack Zilly (5th season)
- Home stadium: Meade Stadium

1967 Yankee Conference football standings
	Conf.					Overall
Team	W		L		T	W		L		T
UMass $	5	–	0	–	0	7	–	2	–	0
Connecticut	4	–	1	–	0	5	–	4	–	0
Rhode Island	2	–	2	–	1	6	–	2	–	1
New Hampshire	2	–	3	–	0	5	–	3	–	0
Vermont	1	–	3	–	1	3	–	5	–	1
Maine	0	–	5	–	0	0	–	8	–	0
$ – Conference champion

The 1967 Rhode Island Rams football team was an American football team that represented the University of Rhode Island as a member of the Yankee Conference during the 1967 NCAA College Division football season. In its fifth season under head coach Jack Zilly, the team compiled a 6–2–1 record (2–2–1 against conference opponents), finished in third place out of six teams in the Yankee Conference, and outscored opponents by a total of 163 to 110. The team played its home games at Meade Stadium in Kingston, Rhode Island.

== Schedule ==
Date	Opponent	Site	Result	Attendance	Source
September 23	at Delaware*	Delaware Stadium; Newark, DE	W 28–17	10,894	
September 30	at Brown*	Brown Stadium; Providence, RI (rivalry)	W 12–8	8,000–8,400	
October 7	New Hampshire	Meade Stadium; Kingston, RI	W 13–6	11,000–12,644	
October 14	at Vermont	Centennial Field; Burlington, VT	T 0–0	6,500	
October 21	at UMass	Alumni Stadium; Hadley, MA	L 24–28	16,100	
October 28	Bucknell*	Meade Stadium; Kingston, RI	W 27–7	7,244–8,000	
November 4	at Boston University*	Nickerson Field; Boston, MA	W 7–6	4,000	
November 11	Maine	Meade Stadium; Kingston, RI	W 34–12	5,000–7,777	
November 18	Connecticut	Meade Stadium; Kingston, RI (rivalry)	L 18–26	8,000	
*Non-conference game
