= 1967 Drexel Dragons football team =

American college football season

1967 Drexel Dragons football
- Conference: Middle Atlantic Conference
- Southern College Division
- Record: 3–5 (1–5 MAC)
- Head coach: Tom Grebis (7th season)
- Home stadium: Drexel Field

1967 Middle Atlantic Conference football standings
	Conf.					Overall
Team	W		L		T	W		L		T
University Division
Temple x	4	–	0	–	0	7	–	2	–	0
Hofstra	3	–	1	–	0	8	–	2	–	0
Bucknell	3	–	2	–	0	4	–	6	–	0
Gettysburg	2	–	3	–	0	4	–	5	–	0
Delaware	2	–	3	–	0	2	–	7	–	0
Lafayette	2	–	3	–	0	4	–	5	–	0
Lehigh	0	–	4	–	0	1	–	8	–	0
West Chester *	0	–	0	–	0	9	–	0	–	0
Northern College Division
Wilkes x	8	–	0	–	0	8	–	0	–	0
Wagner x	5	–	0	–	0	9	–	0	–	0
Juniata x	5	–	0	–	0	7	–	1	–	0
Delaware Valley	5	–	2	–	0	6	–	2	–	0
Albright	4	–	3	–	0	5	–	4	–	0
Upsala	4	–	4	–	0	4	–	4	–	0
Lycoming	3	–	5	–	0	3	–	5	–	0
Moravian	3	–	6	–	0	3	–	6	–	0
Susquehanna *	0	–	3	–	0	1	–	8	–	0
Southern College Division
Johns Hopkins x	6	–	0	–	0	6	–	1	–	0
Western Maryland	3	–	2	–	0	6	–	3	–	0
Franklin & Marshall	4	–	3	–	0	4	–	4	–	0
Swarthmore	3	–	5	–	0	3	–	5	–	0
Lebanon Valley	3	–	5	–	0	3	–	5	–	0
Dickinson	3	–	5	–	0	3	–	5	–	0
Pennsylvania Military	3	–	5	–	0	3	–	6	–	0
Haverford	2	–	4	–	0	2	–	5	–	0
Muhlenberg	2	–	5	–	1	2	–	5	–	1
Ursinus	1	–	6	–	1	1	–	6	–	1
Drexel	1	–	5	–	0	3	–	5	–	0
x – Division champion/co-champions; * – Ineligible for championship due to insufficient conference games

The 1967 Drexel Dragons football team represented the Drexel Institute of Technology (renamed Drexel University in 1970) as a member of the Middle Atlantic Conference during the 1967 NCAA College Division football season. Tom Grebis was the team's head coach.

== Schedule ==
Date	Time	Opponent	Site	Result	Attendance
September 30	1:30 pm	Lebanon Valley	Drexel Field; Philadelphia, PA	L 16–18	3,200
October 7	1:30 pm	Upsala^{†}	Drexel Field; Philadelphia, PA	L 20–22	6,000
October 14	1:30 pm	RPI*	Drexel Field; Philadelphia, PA	W 33–21	1,200
October 21	2:00 pm	at Wilkes	Wilkes-Barre, PA	L 3–13	6,500
October 28	2:00 pm	at Pennsylvania Military	Chester, PA	W 19–6	4,500
November 4	1:30 pm	Gettysburg*	Drexel Field; Philadelphia, PA	W 27–20	1,850
November 11	2:00 pm	at Western Maryland		L 0–15	2,500
November 18	1:30 pm	Albright	Drexel Field; Philadelphia, PA	L 14–20	1,126
*Non-conference game; ^{†}Homecoming; All times are in Eastern time

== Roster ==
1967 Drexel Dragons football team roster
Players
Coaches
Offense

Pos.	#	Name	Class
	17	Paul Secunda
	18	Lou Pavoni
	19	Paul McGloin
	20	Ken Wise
	21	Rich Unipan
	23	John Paczosa
	24	Randolph Holmes
	25	Bill Beer
	26	Ed Wieland
	27	Edward McFillin
	28	Mike DiDonato
	30	Mike Kirwan
	32	James Lynch
	39	Steve McNihcol
	41	Wayne Huntsinger
	44	Clifford Risell
	50	Mike Smith
	52	John Durham
	53	Mike Stitt
	54	Gene Blasko
	55	Anthony Gromalski
	56	Larry Colbert
	57	Steve Terebus
	59	David Lofink
	60	John Juzwiak
	61	Edward Mattio
	62	Pete Sculley
	63	Paul Claffey
	64	John Kozakowski
	65	Jim Reed
	66	Tony Stonis
	80	Gregg Dubas
	81	Stan Czermanski
	82	Gene Rydel
	83	Carl Hertrich
	84	Bob Enoch
	85	Tom Laing

Defense

Pos.	#	Name	Class

Special teams

Pos.	#	Name	Class

Head coach

- Tom Grebis (Drexel)

Coordinators/assistant coaches

- Herman Epstein (Maryland)
- Joe Vetter (Drexel)

Legend

- (C) Team captain
- (S) Suspended
- (I) Ineligible
- Injured
- Redshirt
