= Tobacco Bowl =

Tobacco Bowl (defunct)
- Tobacco Festival Bowl
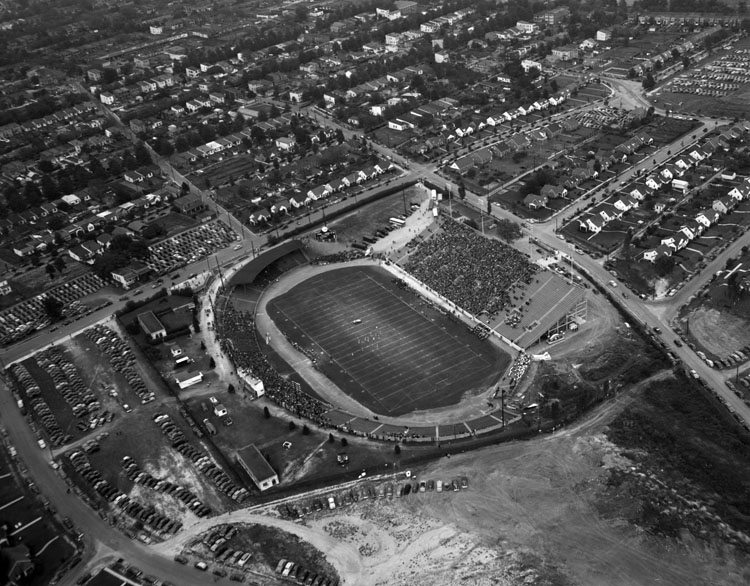
- The Tobacco Bowl in 1949
- Stadium: City Stadium
- Location: Richmond, Virginia
- Operated: 1949–1982
- Conference tie-ins: None

Sponsors
- National Tobacco Festival

The Tobacco Bowl (or Tobacco Festival Bowl) was a college football game held in Richmond, Virginia from 1949 to 1982. Despite its "bowl" designation, it was not a postseason game, but an in-season neutral-site contest that typically featured regional rivals from Virginia and neighboring states. The Tobacco Bowl was always played in Richmond City Stadium. Virginia Tech (branded as VPI until the 1970s, after its official name, Virginia Polytechnic Institute), played in the most Tobacco Bowls (12), followed by Virginia (11) and VMI (10), but the game hosted the Virginia-Virginia Tech rivalry game just twice, and the VMI-Virginia Tech rivalry game only once. After appearing in just four of the first 29 Tobacco Bowls, the city's own University of Richmond Spiders played in each of the last five games, against a visiting team from elsewhere in the southeast.

The Tobacco Bowl was Richmond's counterpart to the longer-lasting Oyster Bowl in Norfolk, Virginia, and the short-lived Harvest Bowl in Roanoke, Virginia, which were also regular season neutral-site contests. The game served as centerpiece of the National Tobacco Festival, which was held in Richmond every fall from 1948 until 1984. The festival included multiple activities in addition to the football game, including a parade, dinners, balls, and beauty contests. The queen was selected from a group of crowned tobacco princesses who arrived in Richmond from all over the East Coast.

The National Tobacco Festival was originally held in South Boston, Virginia (without a football game) from its inception in 1935 to 1941, when it was suspended during World War II.

== Game results ==
Note: Results are difficult to find; the following results have been compiled from various sources.

Annual	Date	Winner		Loser		Ref.
1st	October 15, 1949	VMI	14	Richmond	7	
2nd	October 14, 1950	Virginia	26	Washington and Lee	21	
3rd	October 13, 1951	William & Mary	7	Wake Forest	6	
4th	October 18, 1952	Virginia	33	VMI	14	
5th	September 19, 1953	William & Mary	16	Wake Forest	14	
6th	September 25, 1954	VPI	32	Wake Forest	0	
7th	October 8, 1955	Penn State	26	Virginia	7	
8th	October 13, 1956	South Carolina	27	Virginia	13	
9th	October 19, 1957	Virginia	38	VPI	7	
10th	October 25, 1958	West Virginia	21	VPI	20	
11th	October 17, 1959	VPI	40	Virginia	14	
12th	September 24, 1960	VPI	15	West Virginia	0	
13th	September 30, 1961	Duke	42	Virginia	0	
14th	September 29, 1962	West Virginia	14	VPI	0	
15th	October 5, 1963	Duke	30	Maryland	12	
16th	October 11, 1964	Virginia	20	VMI	19	
17th	October 16, 1965	Virginia	41	West Virginia	0	
18th	October 15, 1966	VPI	21	Vanderbilt	6	
19th	October 7, 1967	William & Mary	33	VMI	28	
20th	October 19, 1968	West Virginia	20	William & Mary	0	
21st	October 11, 1969	Virginia	28	VMI	10	
22nd	October 24, 1970	Richmond	38	East Carolina	12	
23rd	October 16, 1971	Clemson	32	Virginia	15	
24th	October 28, 1972	William & Mary	17	Virginia Tech	16	
25th	October 13, 1973	Richmond	42	Southern Miss	20	
26th	October 5, 1974	VMI	22	Virginia Tech	17	
27th	October 18, 1975	Richmond	24	VMI	19	
28th	October 9, 1976	Virginia Tech	37	VMI	7	
29th	October 8, 1977	Virginia Tech	17	William & Mary	8	
30th	October 14, 1978	VMI	23	Richmond	6	
31st	October 13, 1979	Duke	34	Richmond	7	
32nd	October 25, 1980	Richmond	18	Virginia Tech	7	
33rd	October 10, 1981	East Carolina	17	Richmond	13	
34th	October 23, 1982	VMI	14	Richmond	0	
