= 1967 Hofstra Flying Dutchmen football team =

American college football season

1967 Hofstra Flying Dutchmen football
- Conference: Middle Atlantic Conference
- University Division
- Record: 8–2 (3–1 MAC)
- Head coach: Howdy Myers (18th season)
- Captains: Mike D'Amato; Frank Marcinowski; Ed Wozniak
- Home stadium: Hofstra Stadium

1967 Middle Atlantic Conference football standings
	Conf.					Overall
Team	W		L		T	W		L		T
University Division
Temple x	4	–	0	–	0	7	–	2	–	0
Hofstra	3	–	1	–	0	8	–	2	–	0
Bucknell	3	–	2	–	0	4	–	6	–	0
Gettysburg	2	–	3	–	0	4	–	5	–	0
Delaware	2	–	3	–	0	2	–	7	–	0
Lafayette	2	–	3	–	0	4	–	5	–	0
Lehigh	0	–	4	–	0	1	–	8	–	0
West Chester *	0	–	0	–	0	9	–	0	–	0
Northern College Division
Wilkes x	8	–	0	–	0	8	–	0	–	0
Wagner x	5	–	0	–	0	9	–	0	–	0
Juniata x	5	–	0	–	0	7	–	1	–	0
Delaware Valley	5	–	2	–	0	6	–	2	–	0
Albright	4	–	3	–	0	5	–	4	–	0
Upsala	4	–	4	–	0	4	–	4	–	0
Lycoming	3	–	5	–	0	3	–	5	–	0
Moravian	3	–	6	–	0	3	–	6	–	0
Susquehanna *	0	–	3	–	0	1	–	8	–	0
Southern College Division
Johns Hopkins x	6	–	0	–	0	6	–	1	–	0
Western Maryland	3	–	2	–	0	6	–	3	–	0
Franklin & Marshall	4	–	3	–	0	4	–	4	–	0
Swarthmore	3	–	5	–	0	3	–	5	–	0
Lebanon Valley	3	–	5	–	0	3	–	5	–	0
Dickinson	3	–	5	–	0	3	–	5	–	0
Pennsylvania Military	3	–	5	–	0	3	–	6	–	0
Haverford	2	–	4	–	0	2	–	5	–	0
Muhlenberg	2	–	5	–	1	2	–	5	–	1
Ursinus	1	–	6	–	1	1	–	6	–	1
Drexel	1	–	5	–	0	3	–	5	–	0
x – Division champion/co-champions; * – Ineligible for championship due to insufficient conference games

The 1967 Hofstra Flying Dutchmen football team was an American football team that represented Hofstra University during the 1967 NCAA College Division football season. Hofstra finished second in the Middle Atlantic Conference, University Division.

In their 18th year under head coach Howard "Howdy" Myers Jr., the Flying Dutchmen compiled an 8–2 record, and outscored opponents 241 to 78. Mike D'Amato, Frank Marcinowski and Ed Wozniak were the team captains.

Hofstra's 3–1 conference record was the second-best in the MAC University Division. Its only conference loss was to that year's champion, Temple (4–0).

The Flying Dutchmen played their home games at Hofstra Stadium on the university's Hempstead campus on Long Island, New York.

== Schedule ==
Date	Opponent	Rank	Site	Result	Attendance	Source
September 16	Gettysburg		Hofstra Stadium; Hempstead, NY	W 17–0	4,500	
September 23	Lafayette		Hofstra Stadium; Hempstead, NY	W 28–0	3,800–4,000	
September 30	Albion*	No. 12	Hofstra Stadium; Hempstead, NY	W 37–0	2,800	
October 7	Delaware	No. 10	Hofstra Stadium; Hempstead, NY	W 33–31	4,500–5,600	
October 14	at Temple	No. 9	Temple Stadium; Philadelphia, PA	L 23–35	10,500	
October 21	Bridgeport*	No. 18	Hofstra Stadium; Hempstead, NY	W 41–0	4,900–5,000	
October 28	at Southern Connecticut*	No. 20	Jess Dow Field; New Haven, CT	W 13–0	2,000–7,500	
November 4	at Merchant Marine*		Tomb Field; Kings Point, NY	W 21–0	3,200	
November 11	Muskingum*		McConagha Stadium; New Concord, OH	L 9–12	2,400–3,000	
November 23	C.W. Post*		Hofstra Stadium; Hempstead, NY	W 19–0	3,800	
*Non-conference game; Rankings from UPI Poll released prior to the game
