= 1967 Lafayette Leopards football team =

American college football season

1967 Lafayette Leopards football
- Conference: Middle Atlantic Conference
- University Division
- Record: 4–5 (2–3 MAC)
- Head coach: Harry Gamble (1st season)
- Captain: Robert Albus
- Home stadium: Fisher Field

1967 Middle Atlantic Conference football standings
	Conf.					Overall
Team	W		L		T	W		L		T
University Division
Temple x	4	–	0	–	0	7	–	2	–	0
Hofstra	3	–	1	–	0	8	–	2	–	0
Bucknell	3	–	2	–	0	4	–	6	–	0
Gettysburg	2	–	3	–	0	4	–	5	–	0
Delaware	2	–	3	–	0	2	–	7	–	0
Lafayette	2	–	3	–	0	4	–	5	–	0
Lehigh	0	–	4	–	0	1	–	8	–	0
West Chester *	0	–	0	–	0	9	–	0	–	0
Northern College Division
Wilkes x	8	–	0	–	0	8	–	0	–	0
Wagner x	5	–	0	–	0	9	–	0	–	0
Juniata x	5	–	0	–	0	7	–	1	–	0
Delaware Valley	5	–	2	–	0	6	–	2	–	0
Albright	4	–	3	–	0	5	–	4	–	0
Upsala	4	–	4	–	0	4	–	4	–	0
Lycoming	3	–	5	–	0	3	–	5	–	0
Moravian	3	–	6	–	0	3	–	6	–	0
Susquehanna *	0	–	3	–	0	1	–	8	–	0
Southern College Division
Johns Hopkins x	6	–	0	–	0	6	–	1	–	0
Western Maryland	3	–	2	–	0	6	–	3	–	0
Franklin & Marshall	4	–	3	–	0	4	–	4	–	0
Swarthmore	3	–	5	–	0	3	–	5	–	0
Lebanon Valley	3	–	5	–	0	3	–	5	–	0
Dickinson	3	–	5	–	0	3	–	5	–	0
Pennsylvania Military	3	–	5	–	0	3	–	6	–	0
Haverford	2	–	4	–	0	2	–	5	–	0
Muhlenberg	2	–	5	–	1	2	–	5	–	1
Ursinus	1	–	6	–	1	1	–	6	–	1
Drexel	1	–	5	–	0	3	–	5	–	0
x – Division champion/co-champions; * – Ineligible for championship due to insufficient conference games

The 1967 Lafayette Leopards football team was an American football team that represented Lafayette College during the 1967 NCAA College Division football season. Lafayette tied for fourth in the Middle Atlantic Conference, University Division, and finished second in the Middle Three Conference.

In their first year under head coach Harry Gamble, the Leopards compiled a 4–5 record. Robert Albus was the team captain.

In conference play, Lafayette's 2–3 record against MAC University Division opponents placed the Leopards in a three-way tie for fourth place among the seven competitors for the division title, with Gettysburg and Delaware. Lafayette went 1–1 against its Middle Three rivals, losing to Rutgers and beating Lehigh.

Lafayette played its home games at Fisher Field on College Hill in Easton, Pennsylvania.

== Schedule ==
Date	Opponent	Site	Result	Attendance	Source
September 23	at No. 12 Hofstra	Hofstra Stadium; Hempstead, NY	L 0–28	3,800–4,000	
September 30	at Harvard*	Harvard Stadium; Boston, MA	L 0–51	13,000–15,000	
October 7	Bucknell	Fisher Field; Easton, PA	W 21–6	6,000	
October 14	Washington & Lee*	Fisher Field; Easton, PA	W 17–6	3,000–3,500	
October 21	Delaware	Fisher Field; Easton, PA	L 2–21	8,000–10,000	
October 28	at Gettysburg	Musselman Stadium; Gettysburg, PA	L 17–27	7,360	
November 4	Rutgers	Fisher Field; Easton, PA	L 3–27	6,000–8,000	
November 11	at Merchant Marine*	Tomb Field; Kings Point, NY	W 36–7	7,000	
November 18	at Lehigh	Taylor Stadium; Bethlehem, PA (The Rivalry)	W 6–0	13,000–13,500	
*Non-conference game; Rankings from UPI Poll released prior to the game
