= 1967 New Hampshire Wildcats football team =

American college football season

1967 New Hampshire Wildcats football
- Conference: Yankee Conference
- Record: 5–3 (2–3 Yankee)
- Head coach: Joe Yukica (2nd season)
- Home stadium: Cowell Stadium

1967 Yankee Conference football standings
	Conf.					Overall
Team	W		L		T	W		L		T
UMass $	5	–	0	–	0	7	–	2	–	0
Connecticut	4	–	1	–	0	5	–	4	–	0
Rhode Island	2	–	2	–	1	6	–	2	–	1
New Hampshire	2	–	3	–	0	5	–	3	–	0
Vermont	1	–	3	–	1	3	–	5	–	1
Maine	0	–	5	–	0	0	–	8	–	0
$ – Conference champion

The 1967 New Hampshire Wildcats football team was an American football team that represented the University of New Hampshire as a member of the Yankee Conference during the 1967 NCAA College Division football season. In its second year under head coach Joe Yukica, the team compiled a 5–3 record (2–3 against conference opponents) and finished fourth out of six teams in the Yankee Conference.

== Schedule ==
Date	Opponent	Site	Result	Attendance	Source
September 30	Colby*	Cowell Stadium; Durham, NH	W 42–6	6,500	
October 7	at Rhode Island	Meade Stadium; Kingston, RI	L 6–13	11,000–12,644	
October 14	at Maine	Alumni Field; Orono, ME (Battle for the Brice–Cowell Musket)	W 17–0	8,900–8,909	
October 21	Vermont	Cowell Stadium; Durham, NH	W 30–6	10,000–13,500	
October 28	Northeastern*	Cowell Stadium; Durham, NH	W 21–13	9,000	
November 4	at Connecticut	Memorial Stadium; Storrs, CT	L 19–20	8,178	
November 11	at Springfield*	Pratt Field; Springfield, MA	W 21–0	3,100	
November 18	UMass	Cowell Stadium; Durham, NH (rivalry)	L 13–14	10,500	
*Non-conference game
