= 1967 Maine Black Bears football team =

American college football season

1967 Maine Black Bears football
- Conference: Yankee Conference
- Record: 0–8 (0–5 Yankee)
- Head coach: Walter Abbott (1st season)
- Captains: Donald White; Keith Kalman
- Home stadium: Alumni Field

1967 Yankee Conference football standings
	Conf.					Overall
Team	W		L		T	W		L		T
UMass $	5	–	0	–	0	7	–	2	–	0
Connecticut	4	–	1	–	0	5	–	4	–	0
Rhode Island	2	–	2	–	1	6	–	2	–	1
New Hampshire	2	–	3	–	0	5	–	3	–	0
Vermont	1	–	3	–	1	3	–	5	–	1
Maine	0	–	5	–	0	0	–	8	–	0
$ – Conference champion

The 1967 Maine Black Bears football team was an American football team that represented the University of Maine as a member of the Yankee Conference during the 1967 NCAA College Division football season. In its first season under head coach Walter Abbott, the team compiled a 0–8 record (0–5 against conference opponents) and finished last in the Yankee Conference. Donald White and Keith Kalman were the team captains.

== Schedule ==
Date	Time	Opponent	Site	Result	Attendance	Source
September 23		UMass	Alumni Field; Orono, ME	L 9–30	7,254–7,500	
September 30	1:30 p.m.	vs. The Citadel*	Portland Stadium; Portland, ME	L 14–42	3,421	
October 7		at Vermont	Centennial Field; Burlington, VT	L 7–18	8,000	
October 14		New Hampshire	Alumni Field; Orono, ME	L 0–17	8,900–8,909	
October 21		Connecticut	Alumni Field; Orono, ME	L 0–21	3,608	
October 28		at Boston College*	Alumni Stadium; Chestnut Hill, MA	L 0–56	10,000	
November 4		Northeastern*	Alumni Field; Orono, ME	L 0–24	4,909	
November 11		at Rhode Island	Meade Stadium; Kingston, RI	L 12–34	5,000–7,777	
*Non-conference game; All times are in Eastern time
