= 1967 Bucknell Bison football team =

American college football season

1967 Bucknell Bison football
- Conference: Middle Atlantic Conference
- University Division
- Record: 4–6 (3–2 MAC)
- Head coach: Carroll Huntress (3rd season)
- Captain: Dick Kaufmann
- Home stadium: Memorial Stadium

1967 Middle Atlantic Conference football standings
	Conf.					Overall
Team	W		L		T	W		L		T
University Division
Temple x	4	–	0	–	0	7	–	2	–	0
Hofstra	3	–	1	–	0	8	–	2	–	0
Bucknell	3	–	2	–	0	4	–	6	–	0
Gettysburg	2	–	3	–	0	4	–	5	–	0
Delaware	2	–	3	–	0	2	–	7	–	0
Lafayette	2	–	3	–	0	4	–	5	–	0
Lehigh	0	–	4	–	0	1	–	8	–	0
West Chester *	0	–	0	–	0	9	–	0	–	0
Northern College Division
Wilkes x	8	–	0	–	0	8	–	0	–	0
Wagner x	5	–	0	–	0	9	–	0	–	0
Juniata x	5	–	0	–	0	7	–	1	–	0
Delaware Valley	5	–	2	–	0	6	–	2	–	0
Albright	4	–	3	–	0	5	–	4	–	0
Upsala	4	–	4	–	0	4	–	4	–	0
Lycoming	3	–	5	–	0	3	–	5	–	0
Moravian	3	–	6	–	0	3	–	6	–	0
Susquehanna *	0	–	3	–	0	1	–	8	–	0
Southern College Division
Johns Hopkins x	6	–	0	–	0	6	–	1	–	0
Western Maryland	3	–	2	–	0	6	–	3	–	0
Franklin & Marshall	4	–	3	–	0	4	–	4	–	0
Swarthmore	3	–	5	–	0	3	–	5	–	0
Lebanon Valley	3	–	5	–	0	3	–	5	–	0
Dickinson	3	–	5	–	0	3	–	5	–	0
Pennsylvania Military	3	–	5	–	0	3	–	6	–	0
Haverford	2	–	4	–	0	2	–	5	–	0
Muhlenberg	2	–	5	–	1	2	–	5	–	1
Ursinus	1	–	6	–	1	1	–	6	–	1
Drexel	1	–	5	–	0	3	–	5	–	0
x – Division champion/co-champions; * – Ineligible for championship due to insufficient conference games

The 1967 Bucknell Bison football team was an American football team that represented Bucknell University during the 1967 NCAA College Division football season. Bucknell placed third in the Middle Atlantic Conference, University Division.

In their third year under head coach Carroll Huntress, the Bison compiled a 4–6 record. Dick Kaufmann was the team captain.

With a 3–2 record against MAC University Division opponents, the Bison narrowly missed second place in the division, finishing half a game behind Hofstra.

Bucknell played its home games at Memorial Stadium on the university campus in Lewisburg, Pennsylvania.

== Schedule ==
Date	Opponent	Site	Result	Attendance	Source
September 16	at Boston University*	Nickerson Field; Boston, MA	L 16–20	8,000	
September 23	Gettysburg	Memorial Stadium; Lewisburg, PA	W 21–16	7,000	
September 30	at Cornell*	Schoellkopf Field; Ithaca, NY	L 7–23	12,000–16,800	
October 7	at Lafayette	Fisher Field; Easton, PA	L 6–21	6,000	
October 14	Lehigh^{†}	Memorial Stadium; Lewisburg, PA	W 14–13	7,000	
October 21	at Penn*	Franklin Field; Philadelphia, PA	W 28–27	12,600–12,647	
October 28	at Rhode Island*	Meade Stadium; Kingston, RI	L 7–27	7,244–8,000	
November 4	Temple^	Memorial Stadium; Lewisburg, PA	L 8–13	8,500	
November 11	at Colgate*	Colgate Athletic Field; Hamilton, NY	L 0–38	4,500–5,000	
November 18	Delaware	Memorial Stadium; Lewisburg, PA	W 35–6	6,000	
*Non-conference game; ^{†}Homecoming; ^ Parents Weekend
