= 1967 Delaware Fightin' Blue Hens football team =

American college football season

1967 Delaware Fightin' Blue Hens football
- Conference: Middle Atlantic Conference
- University Division
- Record: 2–7 (2–3 MAC)
- Head coach: Tubby Raymond (2nd season)
- Offensive scheme: Delaware Wing-T
- Base defense: 5–2
- Captain: Art Smith
- Home stadium: Delaware Stadium

1967 Middle Atlantic Conference football standings
	Conf.					Overall
Team	W		L		T	W		L		T
University Division
Temple x	4	–	0	–	0	7	–	2	–	0
Hofstra	3	–	1	–	0	8	–	2	–	0
Bucknell	3	–	2	–	0	4	–	6	–	0
Gettysburg	2	–	3	–	0	4	–	5	–	0
Delaware	2	–	3	–	0	2	–	7	–	0
Lafayette	2	–	3	–	0	4	–	5	–	0
Lehigh	0	–	4	–	0	1	–	8	–	0
West Chester *	0	–	0	–	0	9	–	0	–	0
Northern College Division
Wilkes x	8	–	0	–	0	8	–	0	–	0
Wagner x	5	–	0	–	0	9	–	0	–	0
Juniata x	5	–	0	–	0	7	–	1	–	0
Delaware Valley	5	–	2	–	0	6	–	2	–	0
Albright	4	–	3	–	0	5	–	4	–	0
Upsala	4	–	4	–	0	4	–	4	–	0
Lycoming	3	–	5	–	0	3	–	5	–	0
Moravian	3	–	6	–	0	3	–	6	–	0
Susquehanna *	0	–	3	–	0	1	–	8	–	0
Southern College Division
Johns Hopkins x	6	–	0	–	0	6	–	1	–	0
Western Maryland	3	–	2	–	0	6	–	3	–	0
Franklin & Marshall	4	–	3	–	0	4	–	4	–	0
Swarthmore	3	–	5	–	0	3	–	5	–	0
Lebanon Valley	3	–	5	–	0	3	–	5	–	0
Dickinson	3	–	5	–	0	3	–	5	–	0
Pennsylvania Military	3	–	5	–	0	3	–	6	–	0
Haverford	2	–	4	–	0	2	–	5	–	0
Muhlenberg	2	–	5	–	1	2	–	5	–	1
Ursinus	1	–	6	–	1	1	–	6	–	1
Drexel	1	–	5	–	0	3	–	5	–	0
x – Division champion/co-champions; * – Ineligible for championship due to insufficient conference games

The 1967 Delaware Fightin' Blue Hens football team was an American football team that represented the University of Delaware in the Middle Atlantic Conference during the 1967 NCAA College Division football season. In its second season under head coach Tubby Raymond, the team compiled a 2–7 record (2–3 against MAC opponents), finished in fourth place in the MAC University Division, and was outscored by a total of 222 to 178. Art Smith was the team captain. The team played its home games at Delaware Stadium in Newark, Delaware.

== Schedule ==
Date	Opponent	Site	Result	Attendance	Source
September 23	Rhode Island*	Delaware Stadium; Newark, DE	L 17–28	10,894	
September 30	Villanova*	Delaware Stadium; Newark, DE (rivalry)	L 13–21	10,425	
October 7	at Hofstra	Hofstra Stadium; Hempstead, NY	L 31–33	4,500–5,600	
October 14	at Rutgers*	Rutgers Stadium; Piscataway, NJ	L 21–29	11,000	
October 21	at Lafayette	Fisher Field; Easton, PA	W 21–2	8,000–10,000	
October 28	Temple	Delaware Stadium; Newark, DE	L 17–26	13,255	
November 4	Buffalo*	Delaware Stadium; Newark, DE	L 19–38	6,200–6,523	
November 11	Lehigh	Delaware Stadium; Newark, DE (rivalry)	W 33–10	8,275	
November 18	at Bucknell	Memorial Stadium; Lewisburg, PA	L 6–35	3,000–6,000	
*Non-conference game
