= 1967 Rutgers Scarlet Knights football team =

American college football season

1967 Rutgers Scarlet Knights football

Middle Three champion
- Conference: Middle Three Conference
- Record: 4–5 (2–0 Middle Three)
- Head coach: John F. Bateman (8th season)
- Captains: Thomas Vitolo; Robert Higgins
- Home stadium: Rutgers Stadium

1967 Middle Three Conference football standings
| | Conf. | | | | | Overall |
| Team | W | | L | | T | W | | L | | T |
|---|---|---|---|---|---|---|---|---|---|---|
| Rutgers $ | 2 | – | 0 | – | 0 | 4 | – | 5 | – | 0 |
| Lafayette | 1 | – | 1 | – | 0 | 4 | – | 5 | – | 0 |
| Lehigh | 0 | – | 2 | – | 0 | 1 | – | 8 | – | 0 |
$ – Conference champion

The 1967 Rutgers Scarlet Knights football team represented Rutgers University in the 1967 NCAA University Division football season. In their eighth season under head coach John F. Bateman, the Scarlet Knights compiled a 4–5 record, won the Middle Three Conference championship, and outscored their opponents 212 to 150. The team's statistical leaders included Bruce Van Ness with 504 passing yards, Bryant Mitchell with 542 rushing yards, and Jim Baker with 242 receiving yards.

The Scarlet Knights played their home games at Rutgers Stadium in Piscataway, New Jersey, across the river from the university's main campus in New Brunswick.

== Schedule ==
| Date | Opponent | Site | Result | Attendance | Source |
|---|---|---|---|---|---|
| September 30 | at Princeton* | Palmer Stadium; Princeton, NJ (rivalry) | L 21–22 | 41,000 | |
| October 7 | Lehigh | Rutgers Stadium; Piscataway, NJ | W 14–7 | 17,000 | |
| October 14 | Delaware* | Rutgers Stadium; Piscataway, NJ | W 29–21 | 11,000 | |
| October 21 | at Army* | Michie Stadium; West Point, NY | L 3–14 | 31,000 | |
| October 28 | at Columbia* | Baker Field; New York, NY | L 13–24 | 10,000 | |
| November 4 | at Lafayette | Fisher Field; Easton, PA | W 27–3 | 6,000–8,000 | |
| November 11 | at UMass* | McGuirk Stadium; Hadley, MA | L 7–30 | 13,000 | |
| November 18 | Holy Cross* | Rutgers Stadium; Piscataway, NJ | L 10–21 | 16,000 | |
| November 25 | Colgate* | Rutgers Stadium; Piscataway, NJ | W 31–28 | 10,500 | |
*Non-conference game
