= 1967 Furman Paladins football team =

American college football season

1967 Furman Paladins football
- Conference: Southern Conference
- Record: 5–5 (2–3 SoCon)
- Head coach: Bob King (10th season)
- Home stadium: Sirrine Stadium

1967 Southern Conference football standings
	Conf.					Overall
Team	W		L		T	W		L		T
West Virginia $	4	–	0	–	1	5	–	4	–	1
East Carolina	4	–	1	–	0	8	–	2	–	0
Richmond	5	–	2	–	0	5	–	5	–	0
William & Mary	2	–	2	–	1	5	–	4	–	0
VMI	2	–	3	–	0	6	–	4	–	0
Furman	2	–	3	–	0	5	–	5	–	0
The Citadel	2	–	4	–	0	5	–	5	–	0
Davidson	1	–	5	–	0	4	–	5	–	0
$ – Conference champion; West Virginia's game against Villanova and Furman's game against Lehigh counted in the conference standings.

The 1967 Furman Paladins football team was an American football team that represented Furman University as a member of the Southern Conference (SoCon) during the 1967 NCAA University Division football season. In their tenth season under head coach Bob King, the Paladins compiled an overall record of 5–5 with a mark of 2–3 in conference play, tying for fifth place in the SoCon. Furman played home games at Sirrine Stadium in Greenville, South Carolina.

== Schedule ==
Date	Opponent	Site	Result	Attendance	Source
September 9	Mars Hill*	Sirrine Stadium; Greenville, SC	W 42–0		
September 16	Mississippi College*	Sirrine Stadium; Greenville, SC	W 15–6		
September 23	Davidson	Sirrine Stadium; Greenville, SC	L 22–45		
October 7	at Wofford*	Snyder Field; Spartanburg, SC (rivalry)	W 21–20	8,000	
October 14	Richmond	Sirrine Stadium; Greenville, SC	L 14–42	6,200	
October 21	at Tampa*	Phillips Field; Tampa, FL	L 13–39	8,000	
October 28	Lehigh (Note: Furman's game against Lehigh counted in the SoCon standings.)	Sirrine Stadium; Greenville, SC	W 38–15	4,500–5,000	
November 4	at East Carolina	Ficklen Memorial Stadium; Greenville, NC	L 29–34	9,123	
November 11	at Samford*	Seibert Stadium; Homewood, AL	L 28–42		
November 18	at The Citadel	Johnson Hagood Stadium; Charleston, SC (rivalry)	W 14–6	12,425	
*Non-conference game
