= 1967 Wagner Seahawks football team =

American college football season

1967 Wagner Seahawks football

MAC Northern College Division co-champion Lambert Trophy
- Conference: Middle Atlantic Conference
- Northern College Division
- Record: 9–0 (5–0 MAC)
- Head coach: Robert C. Hicks (6th season)
- Home stadium: Fischer Memorial Stadium

1967 Middle Atlantic Conference football standings
	Conf.					Overall
Team	W		L		T	W		L		T
University Division
Temple x	4	–	0	–	0	7	–	2	–	0
Hofstra	3	–	1	–	0	8	–	2	–	0
Bucknell	3	–	2	–	0	4	–	6	–	0
Gettysburg	2	–	3	–	0	4	–	5	–	0
Delaware	2	–	3	–	0	2	–	7	–	0
Lafayette	2	–	3	–	0	4	–	5	–	0
Lehigh	0	–	4	–	0	1	–	8	–	0
West Chester *	0	–	0	–	0	9	–	0	–	0
Northern College Division
Wilkes x	8	–	0	–	0	8	–	0	–	0
Wagner x	5	–	0	–	0	9	–	0	–	0
Juniata x	5	–	0	–	0	7	–	1	–	0
Delaware Valley	5	–	2	–	0	6	–	2	–	0
Albright	4	–	3	–	0	5	–	4	–	0
Upsala	4	–	4	–	0	4	–	4	–	0
Lycoming	3	–	5	–	0	3	–	5	–	0
Moravian	3	–	6	–	0	3	–	6	–	0
Susquehanna *	0	–	3	–	0	1	–	8	–	0
Southern College Division
Johns Hopkins x	6	–	0	–	0	6	–	1	–	0
Western Maryland	3	–	2	–	0	6	–	3	–	0
Franklin & Marshall	4	–	3	–	0	4	–	4	–	0
Swarthmore	3	–	5	–	0	3	–	5	–	0
Lebanon Valley	3	–	5	–	0	3	–	5	–	0
Dickinson	3	–	5	–	0	3	–	5	–	0
Pennsylvania Military	3	–	5	–	0	3	–	6	–	0
Haverford	2	–	4	–	0	2	–	5	–	0
Muhlenberg	2	–	5	–	1	2	–	5	–	1
Ursinus	1	–	6	–	1	1	–	6	–	1
Drexel	1	–	5	–	0	3	–	5	–	0
x – Division champion/co-champions; * – Ineligible for championship due to insufficient conference games

The 1967 Wagner Seahawks football team was an American football team representing Wagner College as a member of the Middle Atlantic Conference (MAC) during the 1967 NCAA College Division football season. In their sixth year under head coach Robert C. Hicks, the Seahawks compiled a 9–0 record (5–0 in conference games), tied for the MAC Northern College Division championship, and won the Lambert Trophy as the best small-college football team in the east. It was one of only three Wagner football teams (along with the 1960 and 1964 teams) to conclude its season with an undefeated record.

On offense, the Seahawks scored 223 points and gained 3,137 yards of total offense (2,308 rushing, 829 passing). On defense, they gave up 42 points and 1,717 yards of total offense (710 rushing, 1,007 passing).

The team's individual statistical leaders included junior quarterback Peter Boatti with 763 passing yards, 1,320 yards of total offense, and 54 points scored; sophomore fullback Thomas Moore; and junior halfback John Casey with 313 receiving yards.

The team played its home games at Fischer Memorial Stadium in the Grymes Hill neighborhood of Staten Island, New York City.

== Schedule ==
Date	Opponent	Site	Result	Attendance	Source
September 23	Western Maryland	Fischer Memorial Stadium; Staten Island, NY	W 25–8	3,500	
September 30	Lycoming	Fischer Memorial Stadium; Staten Island, NY	W 27–13	3,800	
October 7	Moravian	Fischer Memorial Stadium; Staten Island, NY	W 20–0	4,600	
October 14	at Trenton State*	Trenton, NJ	W 54–7	2,800	
October 21	Tufts*	Fischer Memorial Stadium; Staten Island, NY	W 20–0	7,500	
October 28	at Merchant Marine*	Kings Point, NY	W 21–7	5,500	
November 4	Springfield*	Fischer Memorial Stadium; Staten Island, NY	W 23–7	5,500	
November 11	at Susquehanna	Selinsgrove, PA	W 20–0	5,000	
November 18	at Upsala	East Orange, NJ	W 13–0	10,800	
*Non-conference game
