= VMI–Virginia Tech football rivalry =

American college football rivalry

- VMI Keydets Virginia Tech Hokies
- First meeting: November 29, 1894; VMI 10, VPI 6
- Latest meeting: September 5, 2026; Virginia Tech 73, VMI 3

Statistics
- Total meetings: 80
- All-time series: Virginia Tech leads, 50–25–5
- Largest victory: Virginia Tech 73, VMI 3 (2026)
- Longest win streak: VPI, 7 (1901–1908)
- Current win streak: Virginia Tech, 4 (1982–present)

Locations of Virginia Tech and VMI

The VMI–Virginia Tech football rivalry is an American college football rivalry between the Keydets of Virginia Military Institute and the Hokies of Virginia Tech (formerly known as the Virginia Polytechnic Institute "Fighting Gobblers"). The teams first played in 1894 and last played in 2026. The two schools are only about 80 miles apart in western Virginia and were in the same conference (the Southern Conference) from 1924 to 1964.

== History ==
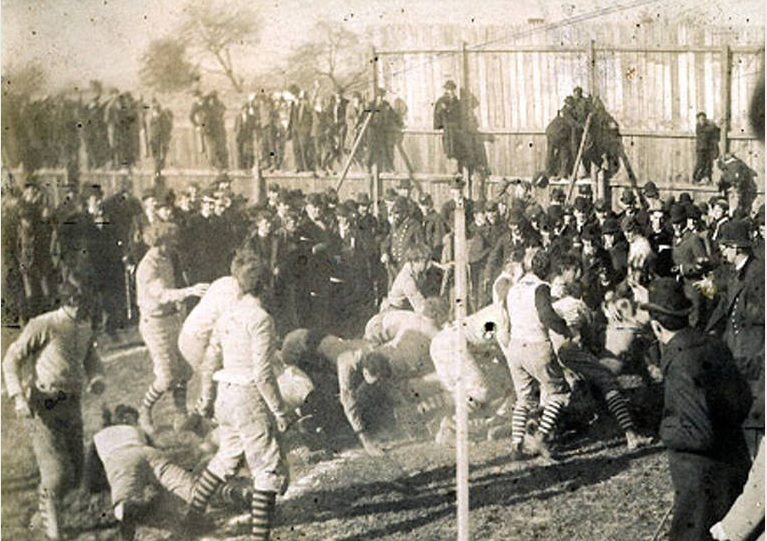
The first VMI-VPI game

The two schools first met in 1894 and played annually from 1913 to 1971, usually in Roanoke on Thanksgiving Day. The game was called the Military Classic of the South, because it matched a state-supported military academy against an engineering school which had mandatory ROTC for the male student body until 1964. (Virginia Tech and Texas A&M are the only major public universities still designated as senior military colleges, because of their corps of cadets and large ROTC programs). Today, the rivalry game between VMI and The Citadel bears the name Military Classic of the South.

After a one-year hiatus, the VMI-Virginia Tech rivalry resumed in 1973 for another dozen seasons. The teams played in Virginia Tech's Lane Stadium at Blacksburg in odd-numbered years and in 1978; the remaining games in even-numbered years were at either Richmond or Norfolk, in the Tobacco Bowl (1974, 1976) and Oyster Bowl (1980, 1982, 1984), respectively, with VMI serving as the "home" team. Games tentatively scheduled for Blacksburg in 1986 and 1987 and Norfolk in 1988 were never played.

When the rivalry went dormant after the 1984 Oyster Bowl, Virginia Tech led the series 49–25–5. At 79 games, it is the second-longest series for the Hokies and fourth-longest for the Keydets. Because of the long pause in the VMI-Virginia Tech series, the Virginia–Virginia Tech rivalry has emerged as the dominant one in the commonwealth.

In 2017, Virginia Tech and VMI agreed to renew their rivalry in a one-time matchup on September 5, 2026, at Blacksburg. Virginia Tech won, 73–3, claiming their 50th victory in the rivalry and achieving the largest margin of victory in the rivalry.

Based on current scheduling commitments, their next opportunity to meet would be in 2031, when Virginia Tech next has an open date.

== Game results ==
VMI victories	Virginia Tech victories	Tie games

No.	Date	Location	Winner	Score
1	November 29, 1894	Staunton, VA	VMI	10–6
2	November 28, 1895	Lynchburg, VA	VAMC	6–4
3	November 26, 1896	Roanoke, VA	VPI	24–0
4	November 25, 1900	Roanoke, VA	VMI	5–0
5	November 28, 1901	Norfolk, VA	VPI	21–0
6	November 27, 1902	Norfolk, VA	VPI	50–5
7	November 24, 1904	Roanoke, VA	VPI	17–5
8	November 30, 1905	Richmond, VA	VPI	34–0
9	November 9, 1907	Roanoke, VA	VPI	22–0
10	October 24, 1908	Roanoke, VA	VPI	10–0
11	November 27, 1913	Roanoke, VA	Tie	6–6
12	November 26, 1914	Roanoke, VA	VPI	3–0
13	November 25, 1915	Roanoke, VA	VPI	27–9
14	November 30, 1916	Roanoke, VA	VPI	23–14
15	November 29, 1917	Roanoke, VA	VPI	6–0
16	November 28, 1918	Roanoke, VA	VPI	6–0
17	November 27, 1919	Roanoke, VA	VMI	13–0
18	November 25, 1920	Roanoke, VA	VMI	24–7
19	November 24, 1921	Roanoke, VA	VPI	26–7
20	November 30, 1922	Roanoke, VA	VPI	7–3
21	November 29, 1923	Roanoke, VA	VMI	6–0
22	November 27, 1924	Roanoke, VA	Tie	0–0
23	November 26, 1925	Roanoke, VA	VPI	7–0
24	November 25, 1926	Roanoke, VA	VPI	14–7
25	November 24, 1927	Roanoke, VA	VMI	12–9
26	November 29, 1928	Roanoke, VA	VMI	16–6
27	November 28, 1929	Roanoke, VA	VMI	14–0
28	November 27, 1930	Roanoke, VA	VPI	24–0
29	November 26, 1931	Roanoke, VA	VPI	13–6
30	November 24, 1932	Roanoke, VA	VPI	26–0
31	November 30, 1933	Roanoke, VA	Tie	0–0
32	November 29, 1934	Roanoke, VA	VPI	13–0
33	November 28, 1935	Roanoke, VA	VPI	12–6
34	November 26, 1936	Roanoke, VA	VPI	6–0
35	November 25, 1937	Roanoke, VA	VPI	12–6
36	November 24, 1938	Roanoke, VA	Tie	2–2
37	November 30, 1939	Roanoke, VA	VMI	19–7
38	November 21, 1940	Roanoke, VA	VMI	14–0
39	November 20, 1941	Lynchburg, VA	VMI	15–10
40	November 26, 1942	Roanoke, VA	VPI	20–6
41	November 22, 1945	Roanoke, VA	VMI	7–0

No.	Date	Location	Winner	Score
42	November 28, 1946	Roanoke, VA	VPI	20–7
43	November 27, 1947	Roanoke, VA	VMI	28–14
44	November 25, 1948	Roanoke, VA	VMI	33–7
45	November 24, 1949	Roanoke, VA	Tie	28–28
46	November 23, 1950	Roanoke, VA	VMI	27–0
47	November 22, 1951	Roanoke, VA	VMI	20–14
48	November 27, 1952	Roanoke, VA	VPI	26–7
49	November 26, 1953	Roanoke, VA	VMI	28–13
50	November 25, 1954	Roanoke, VA	#16 VPI	46–9
51	November 24, 1955	Roanoke, VA	VPI	39–13
52	November 22, 1956	Roanoke, VA	VPI	45–0
53	November 28, 1957	Roanoke, VA	VMI	14–6
54	November 27, 1958	Roanoke, VA	VPI	21–16
55	November 26, 1959	Roanoke, VA	VMI	37–12
56	November 24, 1960	Roanoke, VA	Virginia Tech	13–12
57	November 23, 1961	Roanoke, VA	VMI	6–0
58	November 22, 1962	Roanoke, VA	VMI	14–9
59	November 28, 1963	Roanoke, VA	Virginia Tech	35–20
60	November 26, 1964	Roanoke, VA	Virginia Tech	35–13
61	November 25, 1965	Roanoke, VA	Virginia Tech	44–13
62	November 24, 1966	Roanoke, VA	Virginia Tech	70–12
63	November 23, 1967	Roanoke, VA	VMI	12–10
64	November 28, 1968	Roanoke, VA	Virginia Tech	55–6
65	November 27, 1969	Roanoke, VA	Virginia Tech	52–0
66	November 21, 1970	Roanoke, VA	Virginia Tech	20–14
67	November 27, 1971	Roanoke, VA	Virginia Tech	34–0
68	November 17, 1973	Blacksburg, VA	VMI	22–21
69	October 5, 1974	Richmond, VA	VMI	22–17
70	November 15, 1975	Blacksburg, VA	Virginia Tech	33–0
71	October 9, 1976	Richmond, VA	Virginia Tech	37–7
72	November 26, 1977	Blacksburg, VA	Virginia Tech	27–7
73	November 18, 1978	Blacksburg, VA	Virginia Tech	28–2
74	November 17, 1979	Blacksburg, VA	Virginia Tech	27–20
75	November 15, 1980	Norfolk, VA	Virginia Tech	21–6
76	November 21, 1981	Blacksburg, VA	VMI	6–0
77	November 20, 1982	Norfolk, VA	Virginia Tech	14–3
78	September 24, 1983	Blacksburg, VA	Virginia Tech	28–0
79	October 6, 1984	Norfolk, VA	Virginia Tech	54–7
80	September 5, 2026	Blacksburg, VA	Virginia Tech	73–3
Series: Virginia Tech leads 50–25–5

== See also ==
- List of NCAA college football rivalry games
