= Blum Stadium =

Football stadium in Fairfield, Iowa

Coordinates: 41.021298°N 91.964128°W

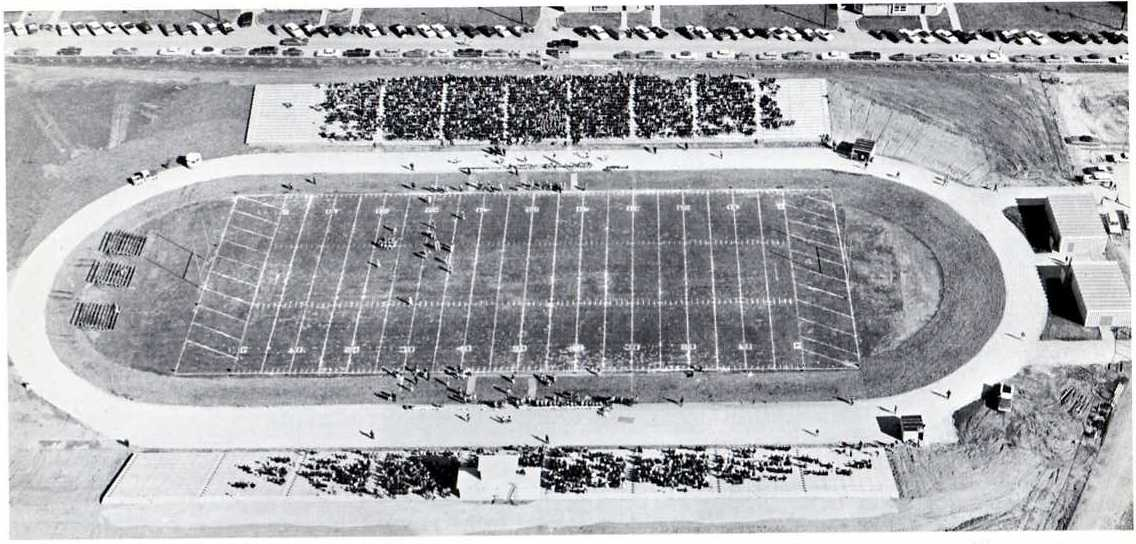
Parsons College Blum Stadium, October 22, 1966 vs. Delta State. View is looking from west to east.

Blum Stadium was the home of Parsons College (Fairfield, Iowa) Wildcats football from 1966 through their final season in 1970. The dedication game was a 37–7 victory over Los Angeles State on October 8, 1966. The final game was a 10–8 victory over Wayne State (Mich.) on October 24, 1970. Parsons overall record at Blum Stadium was 17–9.

== Background ==
In previous years, Parsons had played on campus at Alumni Field. Alumni Field was re-dedicated as Johnson Field in 1947, in honor of the faculty member who led the effort to create the playing field facility in the early 1900s. This small venue was razed in the late 1950s to make room for Fry-Thomas Fieldhouse. This location is directly south of the Blum Stadium site, in the southeast corner of the campus. From the late 1950s up to 1966, Parsons played their home games at Fairfield High School's stadium, which is located in the eastern section of Fairfield, just north of US Route 34.

== Construction ==
Blum Stadium consisted of concrete seating placed along both sides of the field from back-of-endzone to back-of-endzone. The seating was built into an earthen horseshoe that transitioned from being excavated at the northern end to build up embankment on the southern end. The wooden pressbox was located on the western side of the stadium. The scoreboard stood atop the earthen ridge on the north end of the stadium. Two pre-fab sheet metal dressing rooms were located side by side at the south end of the stadium.

According to newspaper accounts of the time, one week before the dedication game, the stadium consisted of the sodded playing field, and the earthen horseshoe. The concrete foundations for the seating had been constructed, but no seats were in place. In the week leading up to the dedication game, the pre-cast concrete seating/walkway sections were trucked in, set into place, and wooden bench seats were bolted onto them. The wooden pressbox was built in the few days before the game. Also, the dressing rooms, scoreboard, goalposts and a chain link fence around the stadium were installed during this week. Carpenters were still working on the pressbox within 40 minutes of the 1:30 pm kickoff, and sod was being placed at the same time. In the 1967 (1966–67 schoolyear) Parsons yearbook (The Peira), the description of the dedication game refers to "Instant Blum Stadium."

== Later use and demolition ==
After acquiring the Parsons campus in 1974, the Maharishi University of Management used the site as a soccer field/stadium up into the early 2000s, when it was demolished as a part of their program of transforming the campus along Maharishi Sthapatya Veda principles of architecture. The concrete seats and much of their embankment were removed to "smooth out" the earthen bowl. The playing field remains.

== Photo gallery ==
Alumni Field/Johnson Field

Johnson Field, 1950

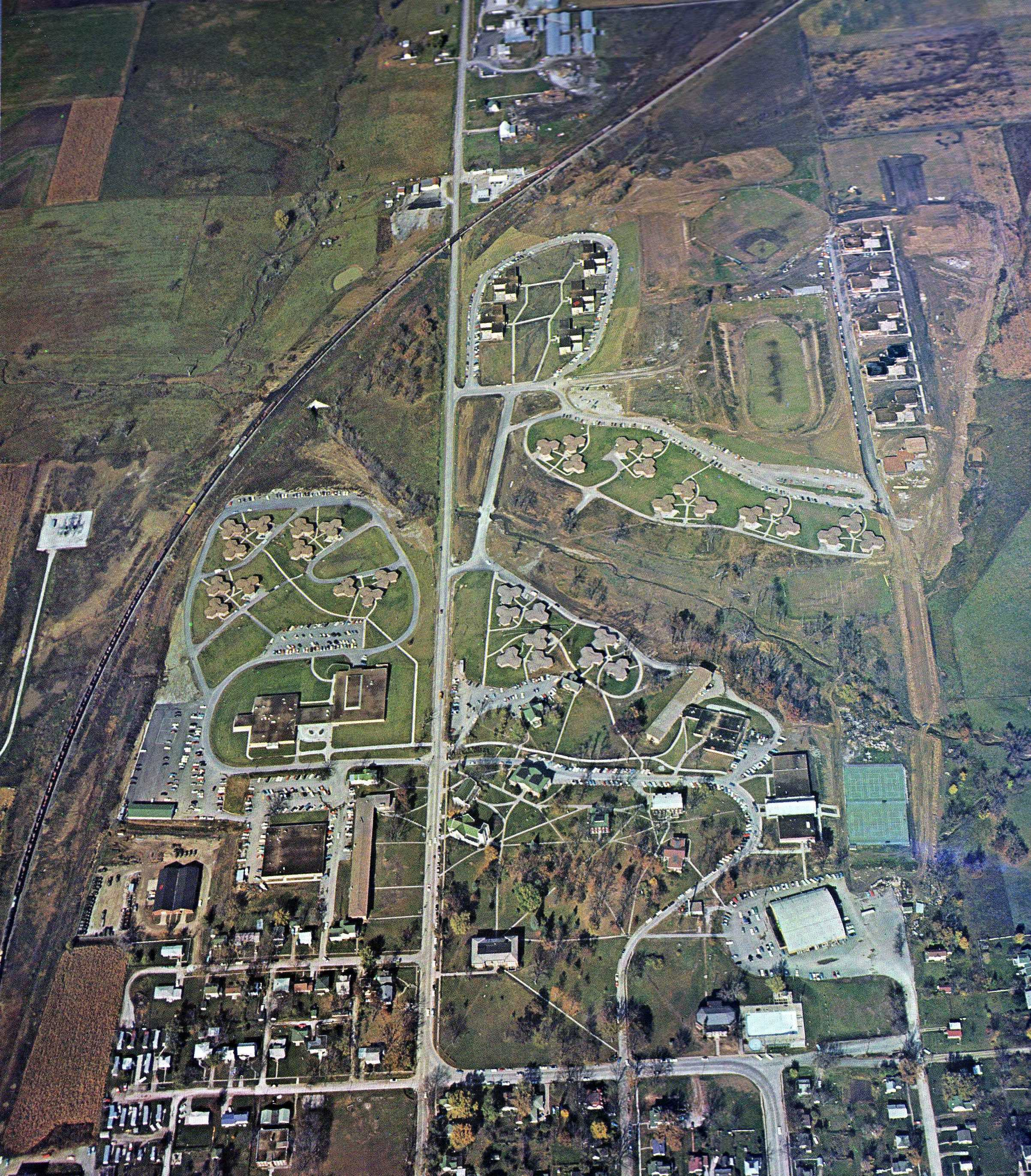
Aerial view of Parsons campus in 1964. Bowl of future Blum Stadium clearly visible

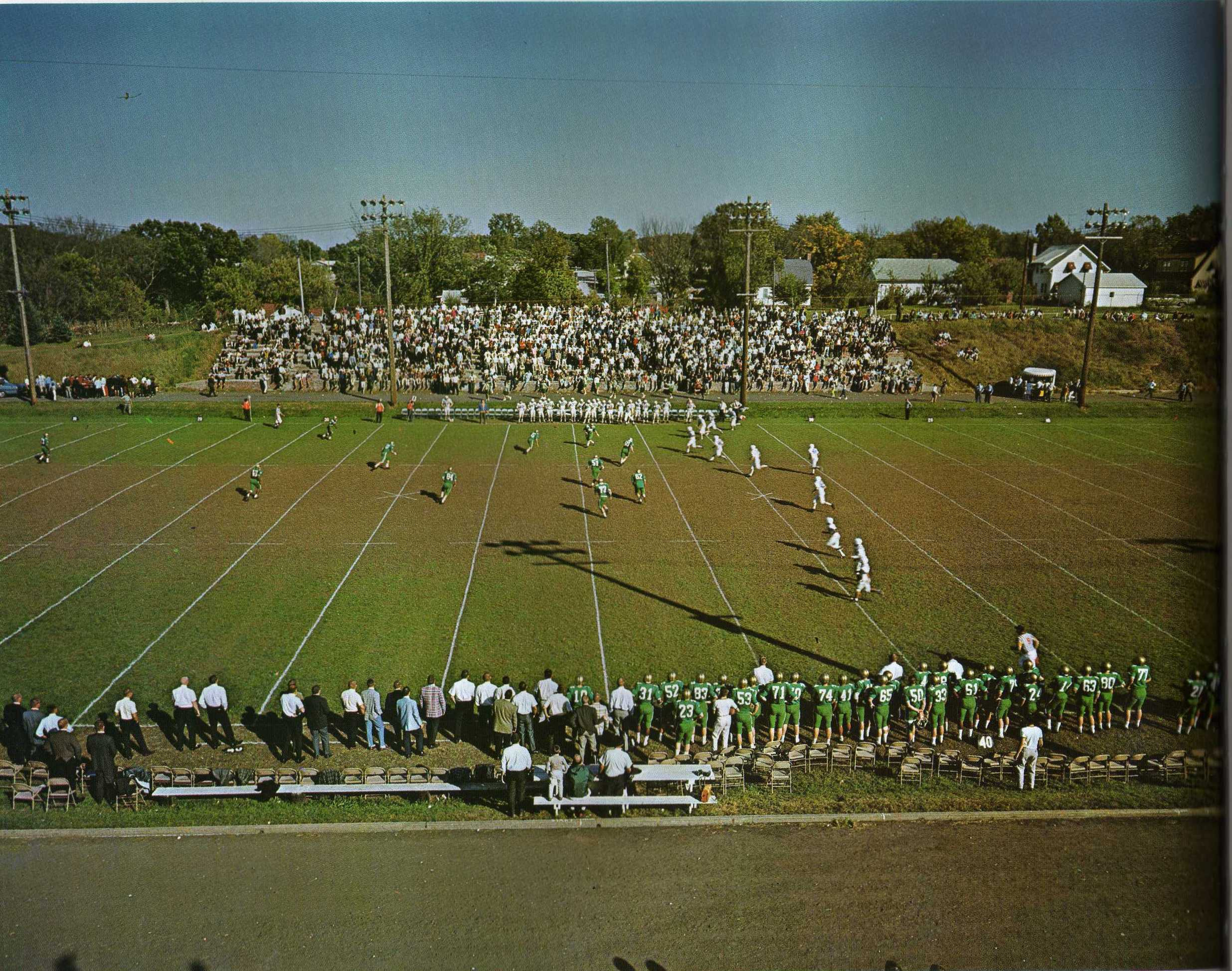
October 2, 1965, Parsons vs. Northwood (MI) at Fairfield High School (Year before opening Blum Stadium)

Conceptual drawing of Blum Stadium. Note differences with as-built final product.

Map of Parsons campus in 1966

Cover of game program for dedication game vs. Los Angeles State

Blum Stadium seating chart. East stands were for students and general admission.

Parsons 1966 football coaching staff

Parsons 1966 football coaching staff with narrative

Narrative from game program for dedication game vs. Los Angeles State

Parsons College football team taking the field at dedication game, October 8, 1966 vs. Los Angeles State

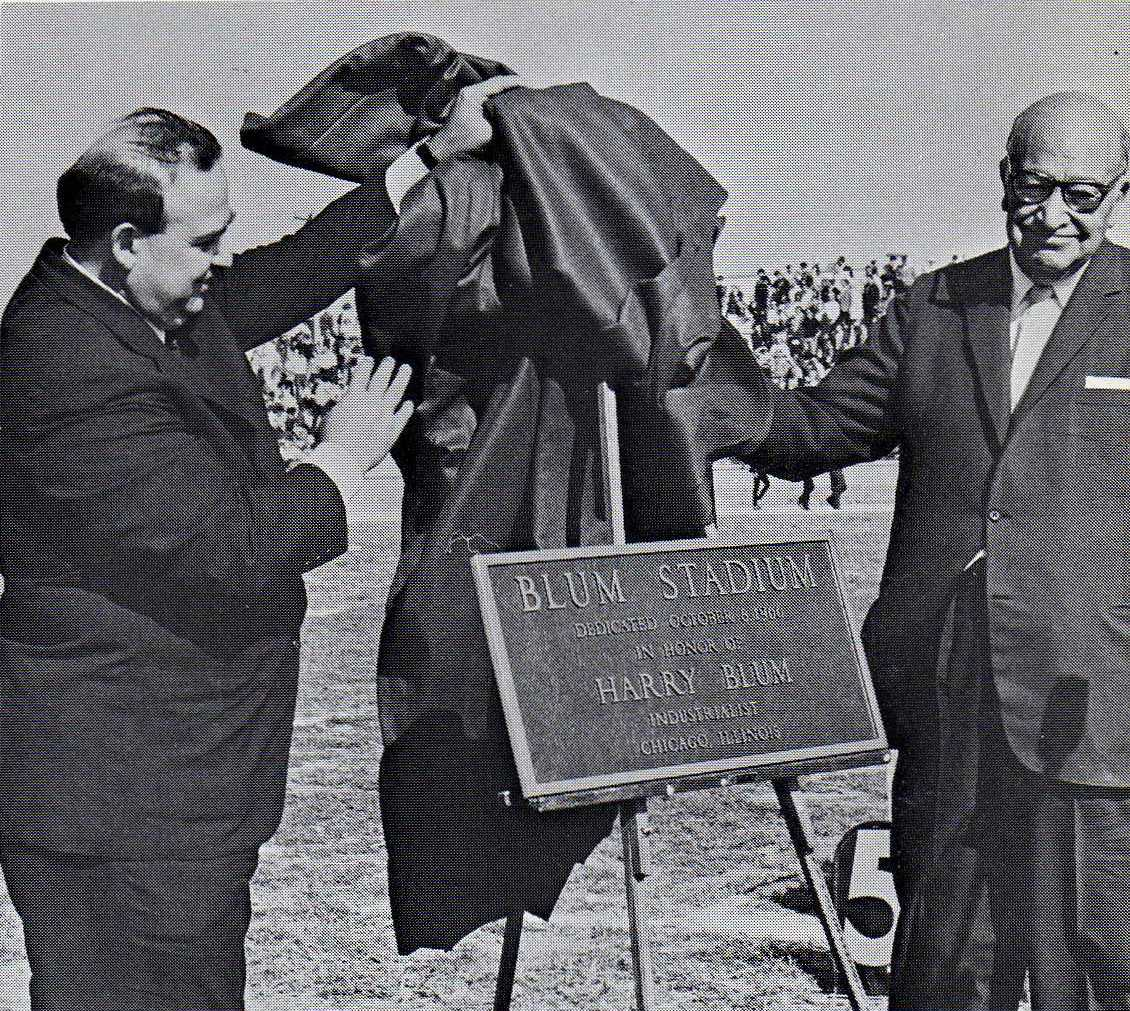
Unveiling of Plaque during halftime of dedication game. Millard Roberts on left, Harry Blum on right

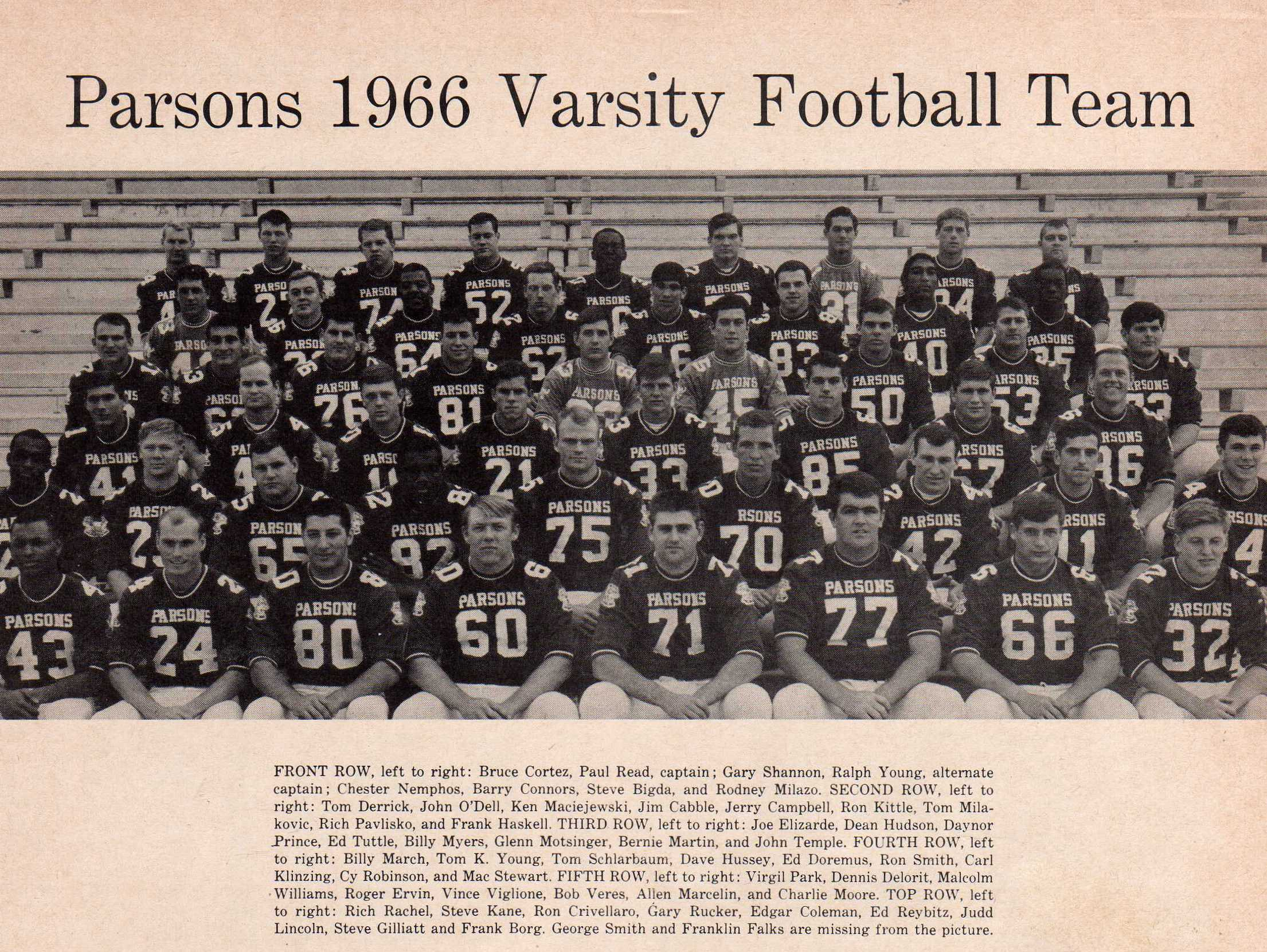
Parsons 1966 football team

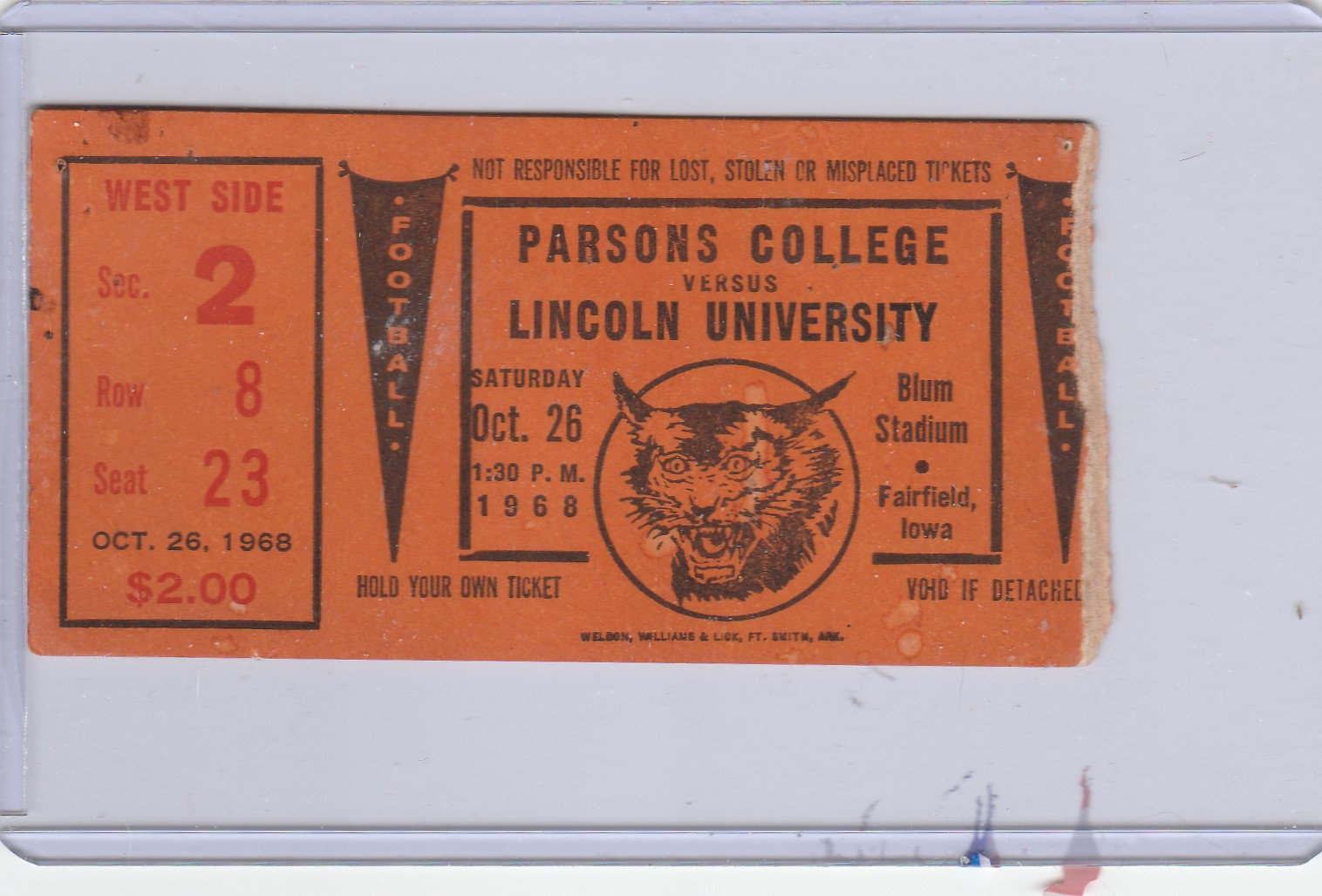
Ticket stub for 1968 Parsons vs. Lincoln U. football game

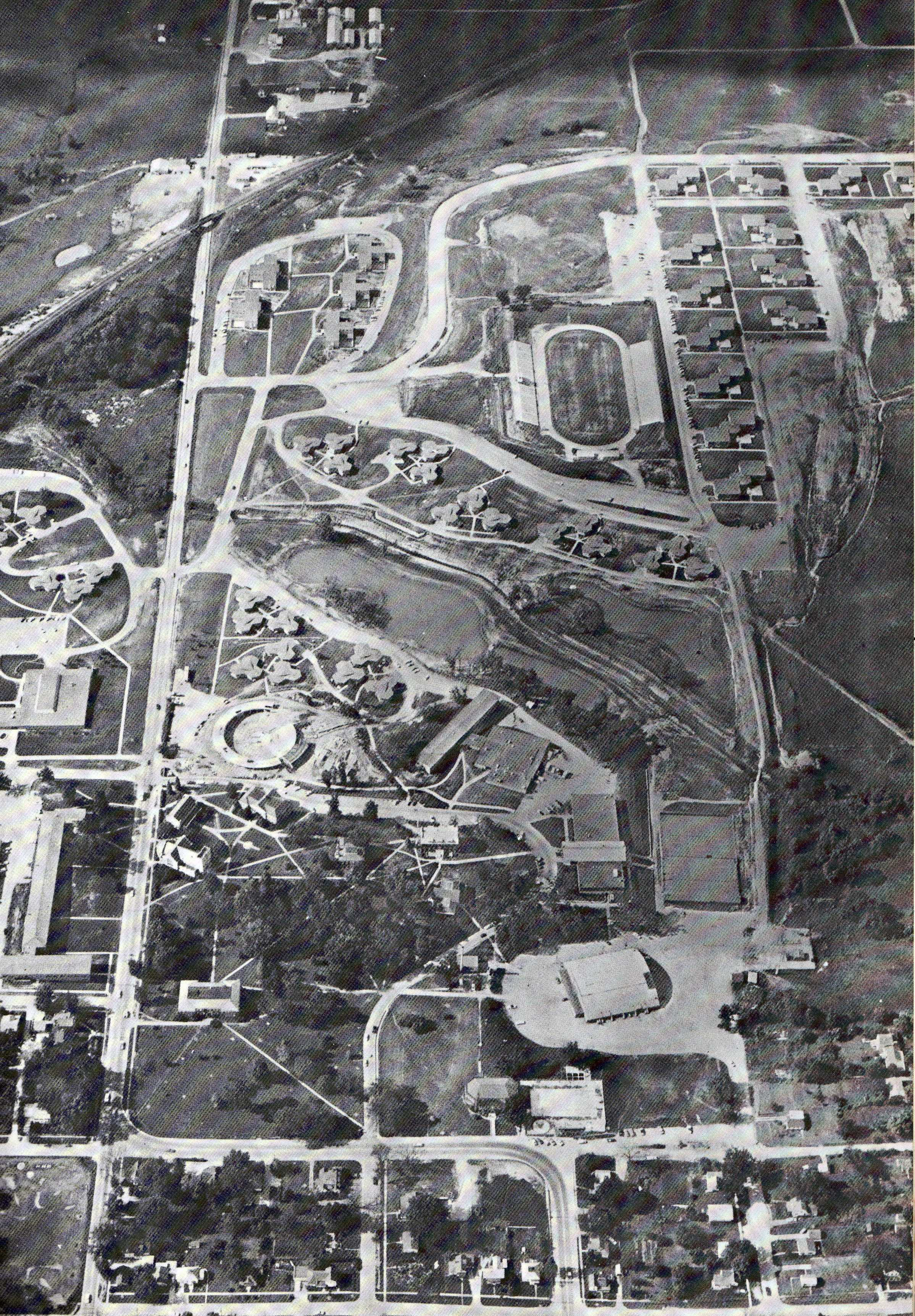
Aerial view of Parsons campus in 1969

Parsons final football team, 1970

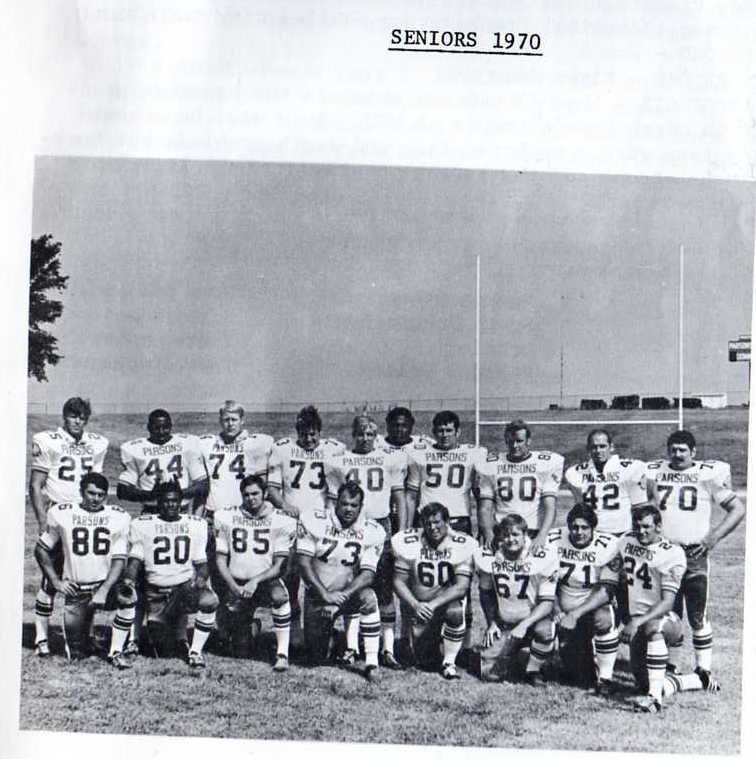
Parsons final senior football players

1970 Parsons football coaching staff. L-R, Tom Schlarbaum, Def. Line, Larry Blixt, Off. Backs, Dr. John Wahrer, AD, Frank Falks, Off. Coordinator/Line, Paul Read, HC/Defense Coord

On the sidelines, Parsons final football game, Gateway Classic, Busch Stadium St. Louis, vs. Tennessee State, 11/21/70

Coach Read and several players, Parsons final football game, Gateway Classic, Busch Stadium St. Louis, vs. Tennessee State, 11/21/70

Rodeo held in Blum Stadium for Homecoming in 1971, year after final football season

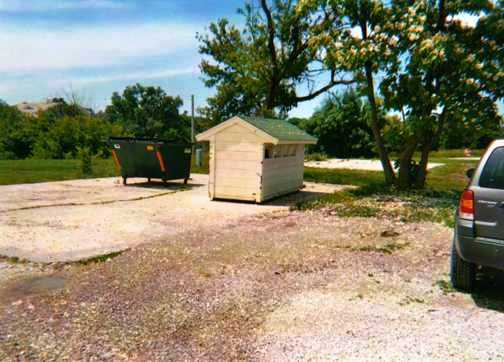
Photo from June 2008 showing concrete pads that were the dressing room floors

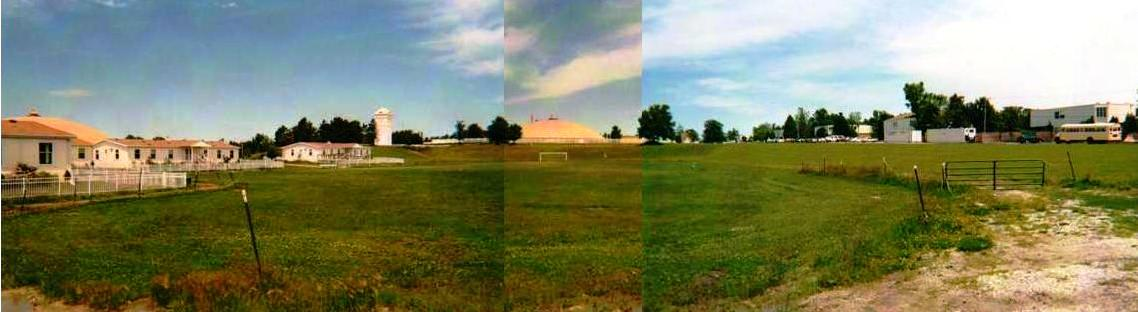
Photos from June 2008 looking from south to north of Blum Stadium location

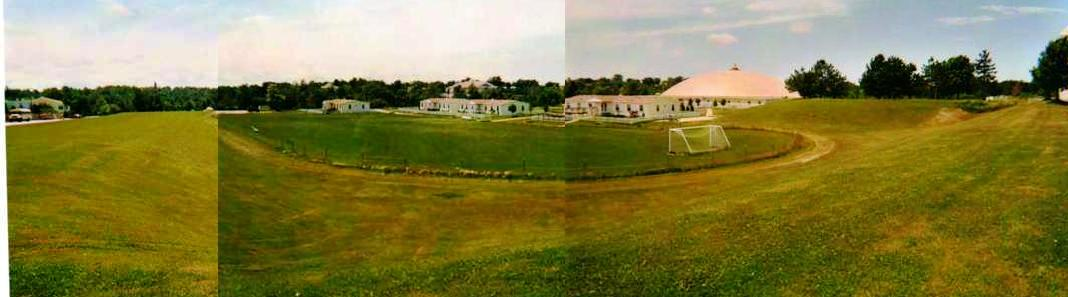
Photos from June 2008 looking from north to south of Blum Stadium location

Lyrics to Parsons College Alma Mater and to Parsons College Fight Song

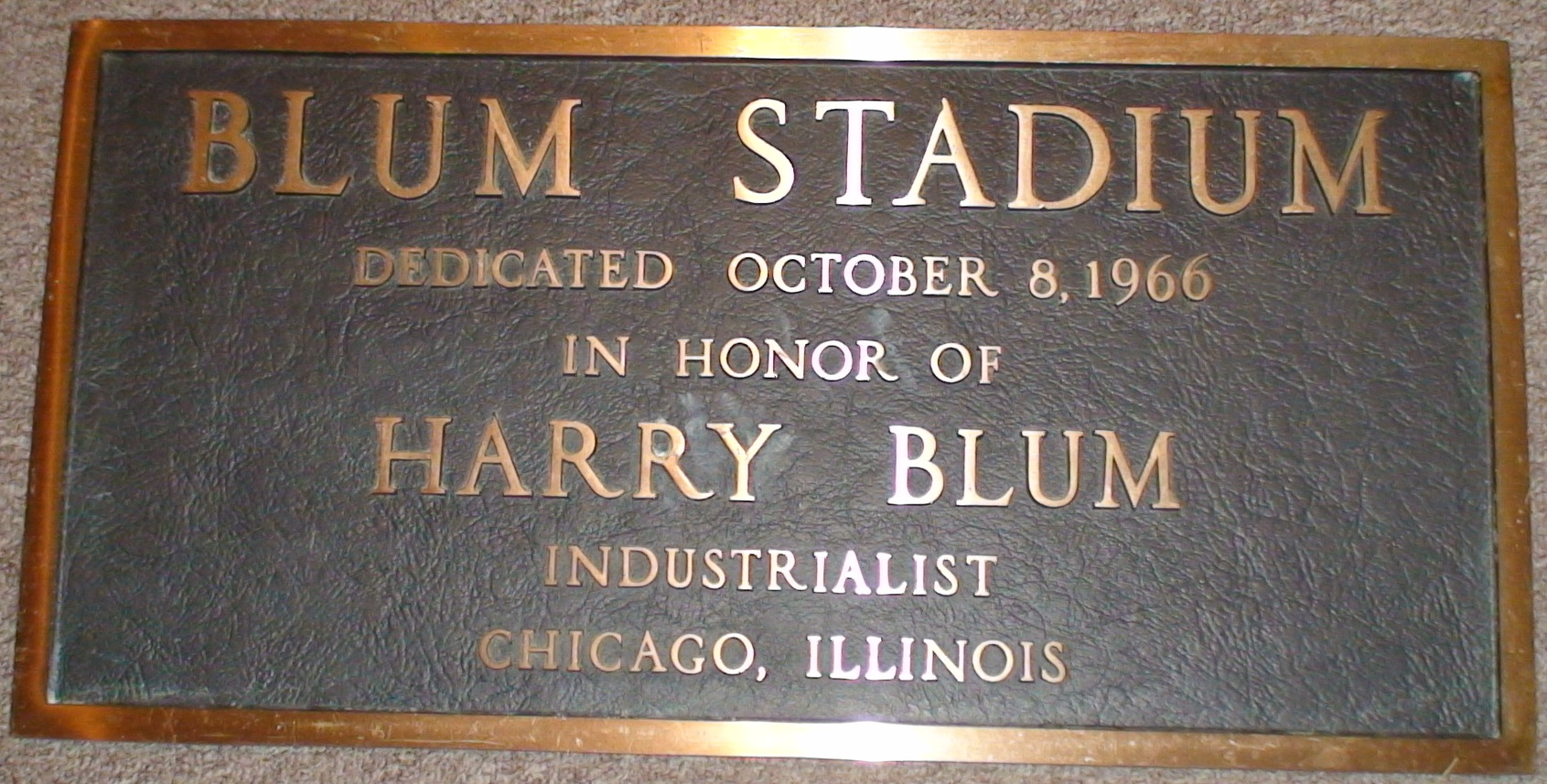
Blum Stadium Bronze Plaque, 2015

== Game Films ==
- Parsons Scrimmage Spring 1966 on Site of future Blum Stadium Part 1
- Parsons Scrimmage Spring 1966 on Site of future Blum Stadium Part 2
- 1966 Parsons at Furman
- 1966 Pecan Bowl Game Film (Parsons in dark jerseys)
- 1967 Parsons at Idaho Game Film
