= Victory Stadium =

Football stadium in Virginia, United States

Coordinates: 37.254004°N 79.943991°W

- Interactive map of Victory Stadium
- Location: Roanoke, Virginia
- Capacity: 25,000
- Surface: Grass

Construction
- Opened: 1942; 84 years ago
- Demolished: 2006; 20 years ago

Tenants
- VPI Gobblers football, high schools

Victory Stadium was an American football stadium located in Roanoke, Virginia. It opened in 1942 and was demolished in 2006.

== Early history (1942–71) ==
Victory Stadium was built on land donated to the city of Roanoke by the Norfolk & Western Railway. Construction began in May 1941. The stadium was completed in time for the 1942 football season, at a cost of $315,000 ($6.2 million in 2025 dollars). The facility had an official capacity of 24,540, making it the largest football stadium in the state of Virginia at the time of its opening.

The stadium featured two identical concrete and steel grandstands with wooden bleachers, built parallel to the east and west sidelines of the field. Each grandstand had an external façade trimmed in red brick. At times, the stadium also had small sets of bleachers behind the north and south end zones, but these were not permanent. While it did not have a press box initially, one was eventually constructed at the top of the west grandstand.

Roanoke celebrated the opening of the stadium on Labor Day, September 7, 1942. The inaugural event, a War Bond rally featuring actress Greer Garson, drew a crowd of "over 6,000," less than one-quarter capacity.

The facility was initially referred to as "Roanoke Municipal Stadium" but on October 26, 1942, the Roanoke City Council resolved "that the stadium be known as Victory Stadium until victory in World War II is achieved." While the name was not intended to be permanent, it remained unchanged until the stadium was demolished in 2006.

=== High school football ===
The first football game at the stadium, on Saturday, September 12, 1942, featured Roanoke's William Fleming High School and Jefferson High School. Jefferson won the game in a rout, 33–0, before a crowd estimated at 5,000–6,000 fans.

Throughout its existence, Victory Stadium functioned as a shared public school stadium for the high schools in Roanoke's city school system. In addition to Jefferson and William Fleming, these included Lucy Addison High School, built for the city's African American minority, and Patrick Henry High School, opened in 1961. William Fleming and Patrick Henry were the stadium's only regular tenants from the early 1970s onward, after Jefferson closed and Lucy Addison became a middle school.

=== College football ===
The first college football game at the stadium, on Saturday, September 19, 1942, matched Virginia Tech (then branded as VPI, after its official name, Virginia Polytechnic Institute) against Catawba College of North Carolina. Tech won 28–14, before just 3,000 fans. Despite the small opening-day crowd, over the next quarter-century Virginia Tech typically played two or three home games per year in Roanoke, motivated by the prospect of drawing larger crowds there than on its campus in Blacksburg. The replacement of Tech's 17,000-seat Miles Stadium with much-larger Lane Stadium, which opened in 1965 with an initial capacity of 35,000, brought the demise of college football at Victory Stadium.

==== The Military Classic of the South ====
From its opening season in 1942 through 1971, Victory Stadium hosted the rivalry game between Virginia Military Institute (VMI) and Virginia Tech. The game was held on Thanksgiving Day from 1942 through 1969, then on the last Saturday of the football season in 1970 and 1971.

The game was called "The Military Classic of the South" because Virginia Tech had mandatory ROTC for its male student body until 1964. (Today, Virginia Tech and Texas A&M are the only major public universities still designated as senior military colleges, because of their corps of cadets and large ROTC programs). Virginia Tech introduced its famous game cannon, Skipper, at the stadium in 1963.

==== Shrine Bowl ====
From 1953 to 1970, Victory Stadium hosted an annual game sponsored by the local Kazim Temple for the benefit of Shriners' hospitals. After the first two games pitted VMI against William & Mary, the 1955 contest matched VMI and George Washington. The rest of the series featured collegiate freshman teams, first Virginia and North Carolina in 1956, then Virginia Tech and VMI from 1957 through 1970.

==== Harvest Bowl ====
From 1958 to 1969, Victory Stadium also hosted an annual regular-season college game known as the Harvest Bowl. Nine of the twelve games featured Virginia Tech. The 1958 Harvest Bowl, matching Tech against Virginia, drew 24,836 fans, the stadium's largest recorded football crowd.

=== Minor league professional football ===
For three seasons (1969 through 1971), Victory Stadium was home to the Roanoke Buckskins of the Atlantic Coast Football League. The Buckskins were affiliated with the Washington Redskins.

== Later years (1971–2006) ==
=== T. C. Williams High School—Remember the Titans ===
In 1971, Victory Stadium hosted the Virginia High School League Group AAA state football championship in which T. C. Williams High School of Alexandria, Virginia defeated Andrew Lewis High School of Salem, Virginia. T.C. Williams' 1971 season was depicted in the 2000 film Remember the Titans, but with Andrew Lewis replaced in the championship game by Marshall High School, which T. C. Williams had defeated weeks earlier, in its closest game of the season. In sharp contrast to the Hollywood version of the championship game (contested at night in "Roanoke Stadium," with an underdog T. C. Williams coming from behind to win on the last play), the actual game at Victory Stadium took place on a sunny afternoon and T. C. Williams was the heavy favorite, beating Andrew Lewis in a rout, 27–0.

=== Other highlights ===
- In 1973, Patrick Henry went on to win the Group AAA state football championship after defeating T. C. Williams, 9–0, at Victory Stadium in a semifinal match.
- Jim Crockett Promotions occasionally promoted professional wrestling matches at Victory Stadium, including a July 10, 1976 card pitting Gene Anderson and Ole Anderson against Dino Bravo and Tim Woods.
- Franklin County Speedway owner Donald "Whitey" Taylor staged several stock car races in the stadium in 1991 and 1992; stock car races had also been run during the 1950s and 1960s.
- In 1996, Victory Stadium hosted the Group AA, Division 4 state football championship in which Salem High School defeated Sherando High School of Stephens City, Virginia 20–12.
- On April 18, 1998, a Dave Matthews Band concert was held at the stadium, attracting 30,000 fans, the largest crowd in Victory Stadium's history.
- In 2004, William Fleming defeated Magna Vista High School of Ridgeway 13–8 in a Group AA, Division 4 state football semi-final at Victory Stadium en route to a state runner-up season.
- From 2000 through 2005, college football returned to the stadium in the form of the Western Virginia Education Classic, a game matching two HBCUs, with proceeds going to Total Action Against Poverty, a local charity. In the final edition of the classic, on October 29, 2005, St. Paul's defeated Shaw, 21–14, with just 2,197 fans in attendance. It was the last college football game played at the stadium.

Victory Stadium's location next to the Roanoke River resulted in the field being flooded several times. The last serious flood occurred in the fall of 2004 and forced many high school football games that season to be moved to other locations. Concerns about the stadium's structural integrity caused engineers to close off upper levels to fans in 2005. Long before that, the original press box at the top of the west stands was abandoned and another one built farther down the stands, at roughly the same height and distance from the field as at a typical high school stadium. After the 2005 football season, with the stadium's fate still undecided, the 2006 home games of William Fleming and Patrick Henry high schools were rescheduled to other high schools in the Roanoke area.

- William Fleming had the distinction of playing in the first and last football games at Victory Stadium. In the final contest, played on November 11, 2005, William Fleming defeated Alleghany High School, 47–6.

== Controversies ==
=== Racial controversy ===
In 1961, Victory Stadium played a role in the Civil Rights Movement. The Baltimore Colts and the Pittsburgh Steelers scheduled a pre-season game at the stadium. Both teams were integrated. However, Victory Stadium was still segregated, with different sections for blacks and whites. The NAACP sued Roanoke. In response to the city digging in its heels and insisting the segregation laws be followed, the NAACP asked the black players to boycott the game, and team members said they would not cross the picket line. "Team representatives huddled with Roanoke officials and apparently came to what would be a classic Roanoke solution: Look the other way and avoid confrontation." Civil Rights activists bought tickets in the white sections, and simply showed up and claimed their seats. Although the Roanoke Fire Department showed up with fire hoses and the Virginia National Guard was called out, there were no confrontations, and the Steelers won the game 24–20. "The Pittsburgh Courier declared that the Steelers had 'held Jim Crow for downs'."

=== Stadium controversy ===
The future of Victory Stadium was on the city of Roanoke's agenda from the early 1990s until 2006. Some residents favored the stadium's replacement with another facility or facilities to provide home football fields for the city's high schools and to provide a venue for outdoor concerts and events. Those favoring its replacement claimed that the stadium was at the end of its useful life. They argued it was far too large for high school football games (which rarely drew more than a few thousand spectators after the early 1970s) and ill-suited for concerts. The site had insufficient parking and was vulnerable to flooding, which necessitated costly clean-ups and repairs. Proponents of renovation cited the stadium's contributions to the city's history. They also argued that a venue of Victory Stadium's capacity was a relatively rare asset for a city the size of Roanoke, which does not have a major university, and could regularly have drawn large events, such as the Dave Matthews Band concert of 1998, with aggressive and creative marketing. Other alternative events suggested were hosting a biannual football game between VMI and The Citadel and hosting gravity games Some also alleged that the city wanted to transfer the property to Carilion, a Roanoke-based company which operates nearby Roanoke Memorial Hospital and is also establishing a biomedical institute and small medical school in the area. Both sides promoted their alternative as being more cost effective.

The matter was controversial in part because debate about the stadium often widened in broader disagreement about economic growth or the lack thereof, the preservation of historic structures, and the resistance to or acceptance of change in general. A generational divide between older Roanokers who remembered when the stadium was filled on a regular basis and younger ones whose experience was only with occasional large crowds for special events and small crowds for high school football games provided another dimension to the disagreement. In the early 2000s, Roanoke's city manager Darlene Burcham supported a proposal to build a hybrid stadium near the Roanoke Civic Center which would have served both as a football stadium and a concert venue. Ground was broken before supporters of Victory Stadium's renovation persuaded Roanoke's city council to halt the project. Momentum appeared to shift towards a renovation until the 2004 flood resulted in an increase in support for replacement. In 2005, a proposal emerged to build small stadiums on the campuses of the two high schools (William Fleming and Patrick Henry) that still called Victory Stadium home. Whether or where an amphitheatre for concerts would be constructed was not specifically addressed. This proposal met generally positive receptions, although some residents who lived near Patrick Henry High School opposed the construction of a stadium there because of concerns about traffic and other disruptions.

== Demolition ==
The question of what to do with Victory Stadium was by most accounts the foremost issue in Roanoke's May 2, 2006, municipal election. A slate of three Democrats, running on an independent ticket dubbed "For the City" against the nominees of the Democratic and Republican parties, won seats on Roanoke's city council in the 2006 election. This slate supported the two stadiums proposal, which also had the support of Roanoke's mayor Nelson Harris. Supporters of Victory Stadium's renovation pointed out that the other candidates for council received more votes in total.

The election rapidly set in motion the process of demolishing the stadium even before the "For the City" slate, which included two non-incumbents, was sworn in on July 1. On May 15, 2006, Roanoke's city council voted 5–2 to begin the search for a firm to demolish Victory Stadium.

In late May, the city accepted a low bid of $486,714, well within the city's $1.2 million budget allocation, from S.B. Cox, Inc., of Richmond, Virginia to tear down the stadium. On May 31, 2006, a citizen's group opposed to the stadium's demolition dropped its lawsuit against the city. The basis for the suit had been that the Norfolk and Western Railroad stipulated in its deed transferring the land to the city that a stadium be built and maintained on the site. The N & W's successor corporation, Norfolk Southern Railway, released the city from this requirement. Demolition began on Monday, June 26, 2006, at 7:30 am, and was completed on July 5.

Several thousand bricks were saved from the stadium's facades. The city made the bricks available on July 8 and 13. The distribution on July 8 was limited to city residents who drove to the distribution center near the stadium. Each car could take up to four bricks; pedestrians were not allowed in the line. Traffic backed up about one mile from the distribution center. The remaining bricks were distributed on July 13. City residents again received first preference, but non-residents were allowed in the line. After the experience of July 8, the distribution process was much smoother on July 13. However, that night, some persons broke into the demolition site and removed other bricks that had not been designated for the distribution. Within a few days, at least one brick was placed for sale on eBay; bricks have also been sold on Craigslist and at yard sales. Many Roanokers have had their bricks engraved to commemorate the stadium. Some bricks have also been set aside for a stadium memorial.

The site of Victory Stadium now has several athletic fields, which has added fields to those at the nearby River's Edge sports complex. The city council voted in June 2007 to build an amphitheatre on part of the site, which (as of 2025) has yet to be constructed.

== Replacement stadiums ==
Patriot Stadium opened on the campus of Patrick Henry High School for the 2007 season. The field was dedicated to former coach Merrill Gainer, who led the team to its 1973 state championship. Both Patrick Henry and William Fleming used Patriot Stadium as their home field for the 2007 and 2008 seasons. Ticket sales at Patriot Stadium are limited to 3,000 as a concession to neighbors' concerns about traffic. William Fleming opened an on-campus stadium in 2009.
