= 1967 Lehigh Engineers football team =

American college football season

1967 Lehigh Engineers football
- Conference: Middle Atlantic Conference
- University Division
- Record: 1–8 (0–4 MAC)
- Head coach: Fred Dunlap (3rd season)
- Captain: Rich Miller
- Home stadium: Taylor Stadium

1967 Middle Atlantic Conference football standings
	Conf.					Overall
Team	W		L		T	W		L		T
University Division
Temple x	4	–	0	–	0	7	–	2	–	0
Hofstra	3	–	1	–	0	8	–	2	–	0
Bucknell	3	–	2	–	0	4	–	6	–	0
Gettysburg	2	–	3	–	0	4	–	5	–	0
Delaware	2	–	3	–	0	2	–	7	–	0
Lafayette	2	–	3	–	0	4	–	5	–	0
Lehigh	0	–	4	–	0	1	–	8	–	0
West Chester *	0	–	0	–	0	9	–	0	–	0
Northern College Division
Wilkes x	8	–	0	–	0	8	–	0	–	0
Wagner x	5	–	0	–	0	9	–	0	–	0
Juniata x	5	–	0	–	0	7	–	1	–	0
Delaware Valley	5	–	2	–	0	6	–	2	–	0
Albright	4	–	3	–	0	5	–	4	–	0
Upsala	4	–	4	–	0	4	–	4	–	0
Lycoming	3	–	5	–	0	3	–	5	–	0
Moravian	3	–	6	–	0	3	–	6	–	0
Susquehanna *	0	–	3	–	0	1	–	8	–	0
Southern College Division
Johns Hopkins x	6	–	0	–	0	6	–	1	–	0
Western Maryland	3	–	2	–	0	6	–	3	–	0
Franklin & Marshall	4	–	3	–	0	4	–	4	–	0
Swarthmore	3	–	5	–	0	3	–	5	–	0
Lebanon Valley	3	–	5	–	0	3	–	5	–	0
Dickinson	3	–	5	–	0	3	–	5	–	0
Pennsylvania Military	3	–	5	–	0	3	–	6	–	0
Haverford	2	–	4	–	0	2	–	5	–	0
Muhlenberg	2	–	5	–	1	2	–	5	–	1
Ursinus	1	–	6	–	1	1	–	6	–	1
Drexel	1	–	5	–	0	3	–	5	–	0
x – Division champion/co-champions; * – Ineligible for championship due to insufficient conference games

The 1967 Lehigh Engineers football team was an American football team that represented Lehigh University during the 1967 NCAA College Division football season. Lehigh finished last in both the Middle Atlantic Conference, University Division, and the Middle Three Conference.

In their third year under head coach Fred Dunlap, the Engineers compiled a 1–8 record. Rich Miller was the team captain.

In conference play, Lehigh's winless (0–4) record against opponents in the MAC University Division represented the worst winning percentage among the seven teams competing for the division title. An eighth team, West Chester, is listed below Lehigh in the standings tables because it was a division member but played no division games.

Lehigh also lost both games to its Middle Three rivals, Lafayette and Rutgers, for a last-place finish in that conference.

Lehigh played its home games at Taylor Stadium on the university campus in Bethlehem, Pennsylvania.

== Schedule ==
Date	Opponent	Site	Result	Attendance	Source
September 23	Ithaca*	Taylor Stadium; Bethlehem, PA	W 50–20	7,100	
September 30	at Penn*	Franklin Field; Philadelphia, PA	L 23–35	10,502	
October 7	at Rutgers	Rutgers Stadium; Piscataway, NJ	L 7–14	17,000	
October 14	at Bucknell	Memorial Stadium; Lewisburg, PA	L 13–14	7,000	
October 21	Gettysburg	Taylor Stadium; Bethlehem, PA	L 7–14	10,380	
October 28	at Furman*	Sirrine Stadium; Greenville, SC	L 15–38	4,500–5,000	
November 4	Colgate*	Taylor Stadium; Bethlehem, PA	L 7–20	7,600	
November 11	at Delaware	Delaware Stadium; Newark, DE (rivalry)	L 10–33	8,275	
November 18	Lafayette	Taylor Stadium; Bethlehem, PA (The Rivalry)	L 0–6	13,500	
*Non-conference game
