= 1959 Texas A&I Javelinas football team =

American college football season

1959 Texas A&I Javelinas football

NAIA national champion LSC co-champion

Holiday Bowl, W 20–6 vs. Lenoir Rhyne
- Conference: Lone Star Conference
- Record: 12–1 (6–1 LSC)
- Head coach: Gil Steinke (6th season)
- Captains: Kenneth Kachtik; Gerald Lambert
- Home stadium: Javelina Stadium

1959 Lone Star Conference football standings
	Conf.					Overall
Team	W		L		T	W		L		T
No. 5 Texas A&I +^	6	–	1	–	0	12	–	1	–	0
No. 4 East Texas State +	6	–	1	–	0	9	–	1	–	0
Lamar Tech	4	–	3	–	0	8	–	3	–	0
Stephen F. Austin	4	–	3	–	0	4	–	6	–	1
Sam Houston State	3	–	4	–	0	5	–	5	–	0
Howard Payne	3	–	4	–	0	3	–	7	–	0
Southwest Texas State	2	–	5	–	0	4	–	6	–	0
Sul Ross	0	–	7	–	0	0	–	9	–	0
+ – Conference co-champions; ^ – NAIA playoff participant; Rankings from NAIA poll

The 1959 Texas A&I Javelinas football team was an American football team that represented the Texas College of Arts and Industries (now known as Texas A&M University–Kingsville) as a member of the Lone Star Conference during the 1959 NAIA football season. The team compiled a 12–1 record, defeated Lenoir Rhyne in the Holiday Bowl, and won the NAIA Football National Championship. It was the first of seven NAIA Football National Championships won by the school (1959, 1969, 1970, 1974, 1975, 1976, and 1979).

== Season overview ==
In its sixth year under head coach Gil Steinke, the team compiled a 12–1 record (6–1 against conference opponents), tied for the Lone Star Conference championship, and defeated Lenoir Rhyne in the Holiday Bowl to win the NAIA national championship.

The team's only official setback was a loss to Stephen F. Austin. The Javelinas also lost on the field to Howard Payne by a 20–0 score and were outgained by 227 yards to minus 54 yards. However, Howard Payne forfeited the game two weeks later due to its use of an academically ineligible sophomore guard.

In the NAIA's Western playoff, the Javelinas defeated the Hillsdale by a 20–0 score. The shutout snapped Hillsdale's streak of 56 games (dating to November 7, 1953) without being held scoreless. The game was watched by an estimated 15 million viewers on CBS Television. Texas A&I faced undefeated Lenoir Rhyne and prevailed by a 20–6 score as sophomore quarterback Jerrell Hayes threw touchdown passes covering 32, 74 and 57 yards. Two of the touchdown passes were caught by halfback Butch Pressley and the other by track star Dick Watson. Pressley totaled 101 rushing yards and 89 receiving yards in the game.

The team played its home games at Javelina Stadium in Kingsville, Texas.

== Honors and awards ==
Six Texas A&I players received first- or second-team honors on the All-Lone Star Conference team selected the conference coaches: guard Gerald Lambert (first); center James Franz (first); halfbacks Barry Copenhaver (second) and Harold Hees (second); fullback Butch Pressley (second); and end Lupe Jaimes (second).

== Schedule ==
Date	Opponent	Site	Result	Attendance	Source
September 12	Corpus Christi*	McAllen High School Stadium; McAllen, TX	W 14–3	3,000	
September 19	Trinity (TX)*	Javelina Stadium; Kingsville, TX	W 30–12	4,000	
September 26	Texas Lutheran*	Javelina Stadium; Kingsville, TX	W 33–6		
October 3	at Howard Payne	Brownwood, TX	W 6–0 (forfeit)		
October 10	East Texas State	Javelina Stadium; Kingsville, TX	W 7–0		
October 17	Arlington State*	Javelina Stadium; Kingsville, TX	W 29–18		
October 24	at Sam Houston State	Huntsville, TX	W 23–10		
October 31	at Stephen F. Austin	Nacogdoches, TX	L 7–24		
November 7	Lamar Tech	Javelina Stadium; Kingsville, TX	W 14–6		
November 14	at Sul Ross	Alpine, TX	W 14–8		
November 21	Southwest Texas State	Javelina Stadium; Kingsville, TX	W 20–0		
December 5	Hillsdale*	Javelina Stadium; Kingsville, TX (NAIA Western playoff)	W 20–0	7,000	
December 12	vs. Lenoir Rhyne*	Al Lang Field; St. Petersburg, FL (Holiday Bowl)	W 20–6	9,500	
*Non-conference game
