= 2002 Gator Bowl =

2002 Toyota Gator Bowl
- 57th Gator Bowl
| Florida State Seminoles | Virginia Tech Hokies |
| (7–4) | (8–3) |
| ACC | Big East |
| 30 | 17 |
| Head coach: Bobby Bowden | Head coach: Frank Beamer |
| AP / Coaches / BCS; 24 / 24 / NR | AP / Coaches / BCS; 15 / 16 / NR |
| | 1 | 2 | 3 | 4 | Total |
|---|---|---|---|---|---|
| Florida State | 0 | 10 | 3 | 17 | 30 |
| Virginia Tech | 3 | 0 | 14 | 0 | 17 |
- Date: January 1, 2002
- Season: 2001
- Stadium: Alltel Stadium
- Location: Jacksonville, Florida
- MVP: WR Javon Walker (FSU); WR André Davis (VT)
- Favorite: Virginia Tech by 2
- National anthem: Lee Greenwood
- Referee: David Witvoet (Big Ten)
- Attendance: 72,202
- Payout: US$3,212,364 (both teams)

United States TV coverage
- Network: NBC
- Announcers: Tom Hammond, Pat Haden, and Chris Wragge
- Nielsen ratings: 6.9

The 2002 Gator Bowl (also known as the 2002 Toyota Gator Bowl for sponsorship reasons) was a post-season American college football bowl game between the Florida State Seminoles and the Virginia Tech Hokies, The 57th edition of the Gator Bowl, it was played at Alltel Stadium in Jacksonville, Florida, on January 1, 2002. The game was the final contest of the 2001 NCAA Division I-A football season for both teams, and ended in a 30–17 victory for Florida State.

Virginia Tech was selected to play in the 2002 Gator Bowl with an 8–3 regular-season record despite having just played in Jacksonville at the end of the previous year. The selection of Virginia Tech over the Syracuse Orangemen (now just the "Orange") despite losing head-to-head and Syracuse having better conference and overall records was controversial. Florida State, who had failed to win at least a share of the Atlantic Coast Conference title for the first time since joining the league in 1992, and who had played in all three BCS National Championship games held to that point, was selected as the opponent.

The 2002 Gator Bowl kicked off on January 1, 2002, at Alltel Stadium in Jacksonville, Florida, exactly one year since the Hokies had last played in the game. The game's early going seemed promising for the defense-minded Hokies. In the first quarter, Tech held Florida State scoreless despite only managing a single field goal on offense. In the second quarter, however, Florida State began to find gaps in the Hokie defense and scored 10 points. At halftime, Florida State held a 10–3 lead.

In the third quarter, Tech struck back. The Hokies scored 14 points in the quarter, while Florida State managed just a field goal. The Hokies' All-American tailback Lee Suggs had suffered a season-ending injury in the first game of the season, but freshman Kevin Jones had carried the offense for the season, and continued to perform well in the post-season Gator Bowl game. With a 5-yard run from Jones and a 55-yard pass from Grant Noel to André Davis, Tech took a 17–13 lead going into the fourth quarter. But the lead quickly evaporated on a 77-yard catch and run from Chris Rix to Javon Walker.

Florida State added ten more points after the long touchdown pass, and the Seminoles went on to win the game, 30–17.

== Team selection ==
At the start of the 2001 college football season, the Gator Bowl Committee held contracts with the Atlantic Coast Conference, Big East Conference, and Notre Dame, allowing the committee to select either Notre Dame or a team from each of the conferences to fill the two available slots. According to contract, the committee had the first selection of teams from each of the two conferences after the conferences' champions were given automatic bids to a Bowl Championship Series game.

According to contract, the Gator Bowl was allowed to select any bowl-eligible Big East team as long as it was within two wins of the second-place team in the conference. This clause generated controversy when Virginia Tech (8–3 record) received the Big East's Gator Bowl spot instead of Syracuse (9–2 record). Syracuse fans, coaches, and players protested the selection of the third-place Hokies ahead of second-place Syracuse. Representing the Atlantic Coast conference was Florida State, which finished second in its conference with a record of 7–4.

=== Florida State ===
Florida State entered the 2001 college football season after a 13–2 loss to Oklahoma in the national championship game. The loss was just the second for the Seminoles that season, and they finished with an 11–2 record. Despite their appearance in the previous year's national championship game, the Seminoles were ranked as the No. 5 team in the country in the USA Today college football preseason poll. Florida State, which had a 70–2 record in Atlantic Coast Conference games since joining the conference, was again favored to win the ACC, but the Seminoles faced challenges replacing Heisman Trophy-winning quarterback Chris Weinke and 14 other starters from the previous year's team. Adding to the Seminoles' challenges in the 2001 season was the loss of two starting wide receivers: Robert Morgan and Anquan Boldin, both of whom suffered season-ending injuries before the first game of the season.

The bad omens of the preseason were discarded in the Seminoles' first two games of the season: a 55–13 win against Duke and a 29–7 victory over UAB. In their third game of the season, however, Florida State suffered what was then the worst defeat in its history of play as a member of the Atlantic Coast Conference, a 41–9 loss to North Carolina. Florida State recovered from the loss by beating Wake Forest, 48–24, but lost to No. 2 Miami in the following week, 49–27.

Three wins followed the loss to Miami, but two losses followed the brief winning streak: to Atlantic Coast Conference rival NC State, 34–28, and in-state rival Florida, 37–13. The loss to NC State was the Seminoles' first home defeat at the hands of an ACC opponent and dropped the Seminoles out of contention for the ACC championship. Following the loss to Florida, the Seminoles accepted a bid to the Gator Bowl. Florida State's final game, a win against ACC opponent Georgia Tech, had no effect other than to improve Florida State's regular-season record, and the Seminoles began to prepare for the Gator Bowl.

=== Virginia Tech ===
The Virginia Tech Hokies began the 2001 season having gone 11–1 the previous season, ending with a 41–20 victory in the 2001 Gator Bowl against Clemson. Fans' hopes for the new season were not as high as the previous year, however. Star quarterback Michael Vick was selected with the first pick in the 2001 NFL draft, and there were questions about how well the team would cope with the loss of Vick and several other important players. Despite those fears, the Hokies began the 2001 season ranked No. 9 in the coaches' poll and were picked in the annual poll of media covering the Big East to finish second in that conference.

In the opening game of the season, Virginia Tech defeated Connecticut, 52–10, but lost starting running back Lee Suggs, who tore his anterior cruciate ligament during the game. Suggs' absence did not affect the Hokies in their next game, as they defeated Western Michigan, 31–0. The Hokies continued their winning streak through the first Virginia Tech games of the season, heading into a conference contest against Syracuse with a 6–0 record and ranked No. 5 in the country. On October 27, however, Syracuse ended Tech's 16-game home winning streak by defeating the Hokies, 22–14, in Lane Stadium.

The loss to Syracuse was followed by another to Pittsburgh in the following week. The twin losses effectively knocked Tech out of contention for the Big East championship, as the Hokies were then two games behind first-place Miami. Tech won its next two games of the season, but because Miami remained undefeated, the matchup between No. 1 Miami and No. 14 Virginia Tech was played without conference title implications. Before the Miami game, Virginia Tech accepted a bid to the Gator Bowl, which had the first pick of Big East teams after the Bowl Championship Series gave an automatic bid to the Big East champion. Miami defeated Tech in the final regular-season game for both teams, 26–24, and the Hokies began preparations for the Gator Bowl.

=== Controversy ===
Virginia Tech's selection for the Gator Bowl was not without controversy. The Hokies' three Big East losses pushed them to third place in the conference, behind Miami (which earned an automatic bid to the national championship game) and Syracuse, which lost only one Big East Conference game. Instead of attending the Gator Bowl, Syracuse earned a bid to the 2002 Insight Bowl, considered to be a less prestigious game due to its lesser payout and shorter history. Syracuse fans, coaches, and players were offended that Virginia Tech was awarded a bid to the Gator Bowl despite Syracuse's better record due to Tech's reputation for bringing large numbers of fans to bowl games. In the wake of Tech's selection, Syracuse athletic director Jake Crouthamel vowed to lobby for changes in the way the Gator Bowl's Big East selection was made.

== Pregame buildup ==
The Florida State/Virginia Tech matchup was the 31st game between the two teams since they first met in 1955. At the time, Florida State held the advantage in wins, with a 19–10–1 record against Virginia Tech. Heading into the 2002 Gator Bowl, however, spread bettors predicted a reversal of that trend as Virginia Tech was favored to win by two points on Dec. 10. This was reflective of an overall feeling of pessimism toward the Seminoles, who hadn't finished out of first place in the ACC since joining the league in 1992, and would not participate in the national championship game for the first time in four years. Because of this decline in stature, the fact that the game was a rematch of the 2000 national championship game received less coverage than it would have otherwise.

Ticket sales for the game were relatively rapid. By Dec. 7, Virginia Tech had sold almost its entire initial allotment of 12,500 tickets, Florida State fans had purchased approximately 6,800 tickets, and total ticket sales neared the 50,000 mark. Tech's sales increased to more than 13,000 by Dec. 14, and Virginia Tech officials requested an initial allotment from the Gator Bowl. Four days later, more than 60,000 tickets had been sold, and there were expectations that the game would be a sellout. The growing demand for tickets was demonstrated by an incident in which nearly 200 all-access passes to the game were stolen in transit from the printer and resold, causing a police search for the culprits.

=== Florida State offense ===
At the conclusion of the regular season, Florida State was ranked No. 26 in total offense, averaging 426.09 yards per game. The Seminoles' rushing offense was ranked No. 55 (159.64 yards per game), but their passing offense was No. 26 (266.45 ypg) and their scoring offense was No. 21, averaging 33.91 points per game on average.

On the field, the Seminoles' offense was led by quarterback Chris Rix, whose passer rating of 150.76 was the seventh-highest in the country. Rix completed 165 of his 286 pass attempts for 2,734 yards and 24 touchdowns, setting an Atlantic Coast Conference record for total offense by a freshman. In recognition of the achievement, he was named the ACC Freshman of the Year. Rix's preferred passing target was wide receiver Javon Walker, who led the team by catching 45 passes for 944 yards and seven touchdowns. Fellow wide receiver Talman Gardner outpaced Walker in touchdowns, catching 11 during the season, enough for No. 5 in Florida State history to that point.

The Seminoles' ground offense was led by running back Greg Jones, who finished the regular season with 713 yards and six rushing touchdowns. Florida State's rushing game also was assisted by the mobility of Chris Rix, who gained 389 yards during the regular season, enough for No. 3 on the team in rushing yards. The Seminoles' kicking game was run by placekicker Xavier Beitia, who successfully kicked 13 of 14 field goals and 44 of 48 extra points during the season for a total of 83 points.

=== Virginia Tech offense ===
Virginia Tech's offense was slightly worse than the national average during the regular season. The Hokies were ranked No. 64 in total offense, averaging 374.09 yards per game. In particular, Tech's passing offense was lacking. That segment of the offense was ranked No. 86, averaging 179.36 yards. This figure was somewhat balanced by the Hokies' rushing attack, which was ranked No. 55 (194.73 ypg). Despite the worse-than-average yardage totals, Tech was ranked No. 25 in scoring offense, or 32.64 points per game. Prior to the Gator Bowl, it was announced that Virginia Tech offensive coordinator Rickey Bustle would be leaving the team to take the same position at the Louisiana-Lafayette. Despite the move, he confirmed he would coach the Hokies during the bowl game in his last act as a Virginia Tech coach.

On the field, the Hokies were led by quarterback Grant Noel, who completed 146 of his 254 pass attempts for 1,826 passing yards, 16 touchdowns, and 11 interceptions. Noel's favorite passing target was André Davis, who caught 39 passes for 623 yards and seven touchdowns. In recognition of his success, Davis was named a first-team all-Big East selection. Fullback Jarrett Ferguson also set three single-season receiving records by catching 25 passes for 256 yards and three touchdowns, all of which were school records for a fullback. Despite those numbers, most of Virginia Tech's offense was gained on the ground. At the beginning of the season, running back Lee Suggs was the leader of the Hokies' rushing offense. He set Virginia Tech records for career rushing touchdowns and career touchdowns before suffering a season-ending injury in the Hokies' game against Connecticut. Following Suggs' injury, his role was taken up by freshman running back Kevin Jones, who set a Tech freshman running record by accumulating 957 yards. That figure also was the fifth most in Division I-A, and he was named Big East rookie of the year and an All-American by The Sporting News.

=== Florida State defense ===
Florida State's defense was ranked No. 43 in the country at the conclusion of the regular season. The Seminoles allowed 356.36 yards per game, on average. State's rushing defense was ranked No. 32 (126 ypg), while its passing defense was ranked No. 76 (230.36 ypg). The Seminoles' defensive squad was led by middle linebacker Bradley Jennings, who had 121 tackles during the regular season—the most on the team. Defensive tackle Darnell Dockett also was a standout performer statistically for the Seminoles, leading the team in tackles for loss and setting the single-season and single-game Florida State records in that category.

=== Virginia Tech defense ===
During the 2001 regular season, the Hokies' defense was the second-best in the country, allowing 237.91 yards per game. In no defensive statistical category were the Hokies worse than No. 10, and that ranking came in punt return defense, where Tech allowed 13.33 yards per return. The Hokies were No. 2 in rushing defense (71.64 ypg) and No. 8 in passing defense (166.27 ypg). Defensively, the Hokies were led by linebacker Ben Taylor, who had 121 tackles (the most on the team) and was named a semifinalist for the Butkus Award, given annually to the best linebacker in the country. Free safety Willie Pile was the team's No. 2 tackler, accumulating 94 tackles, four interceptions, and two fumble recoveries. Unexpectedly, linebacker Chad Cooper was diagnosed with Guillain–Barré syndrome and had to be hospitalized prior to the game.

== Game summary ==
The 2002 Gator Bowl kicked off at 12:30 p.m. EST on January 1, 2002, at Alltel Stadium in Jacksonville, Florida. The in-person attendance was announced as 72,202, and the television broadcast earned a Nielsen rating of 6.9. The Gator Bowl was the only New Year's Day bowl game in 2002 to see a ratings increase over the previous year. The broadcast was provided by NBC, and Tom Hammond, Pat Haden, and Chris Wragge were the sportscasters. Country music artist Lee Greenwood performed his song "God Bless the USA" prior to the game, and sang the traditional pre-game national anthem.

At kickoff, the weather was sunny with variable winds at 5 miles per hour (8.0 km/h). The temperature was 46 °F (8 °C), and the humidity was 42 percent. David Witvoet was the referee. In exchange for playing in the game, the two teams split a payout of $3,212,364. Virginia Tech won the traditional pre-game coin toss to determine first possession and elected to kick off to Florida State to begin the state.

=== First quarter ===
The kickoff was fielded near the Florida State six-yard line and returned 16 yards to the State 22-yard line. The first play of the game was a long pass by quarterback Chris Rix, but the throw was not caught. On the second play, Rix was sacked for a loss of nine yards. A third-down pass was incomplete, and Florida State punted. Virginia Tech returned the kick into Florida State territory, and the Hokies' offense began Tech's first possession of the game at the State 48-yard line. The Hokies' first play was an 18-yard pass from quarterback Grant Noel to tight end Bob Slowikowski, long enough for a first down at the Florida State 29-yard line. From there, running back Kevin Jones gained 12 yards and a first down on a run up the middle of the field. Jones gained three yards on the next play, then Noel was sacked by the Seminoles for a loss of nine yards. On third down, Jones regained some of the lost yardage but was unable to pick up a first down. Facing fourth down, Tech sent in kicker Carter Warley to attempt a 36-yard field goal. The kick was successful, and with 10:56 remaining in the first quarter, Virginia Tech took a 3–0 lead.

Virginia Tech's post-score kickoff was downed in the end zone for a touchback, and Florida State's second possession of the game began at its 20-yard line. On first down, running back Greg Jones gained four yards. A second-down pass from Rix to Gardner gained 11 yards and the Seminoles' first first down of the game. They were unable to gain another first down, however, and punted for the second time in the game. During the return, Florida State was penalized five yards for violating the halo rule that required two yards between the player catching the ball and the nearest defender. The rule has since been rescinded.

Virginia Tech's second drive of the game started at its 28-yard line after the penalty. Jones was stopped for little or no gain on the first two plays of the drive, then Noel completed a long pass to wide receiver Andre Davis, who dodged defenders and advanced the ball to the Florida State 17-yard line, a gain of 55 yards and a first down. Two running plays after the long play gained little yardage, then Tech appeared to gain a touchdown on a passing play from Noel to wide receiver Ernst Wilford. During the play, however, a Tech offensive lineman committed a holding penalty that negated the score. After a 10-yard penalty, Noel fumbled the ball. The loose ball was recovered by Florida State at the State 45-yard line, and Tech was denied a chance to score.

On State's first play after the turnover, Rix was sacked for a four-yard loss. On the next play, Virginia Tech defender Eric Green jumped in front of an errant Rix pass and intercepted it. Green returned the ball to the State 44-yard line, and the Hokies' offense started a drive inside Florida State territory. On the first play of the drive, Tech attempted a reverse pass, but the ball fell incomplete. Two subsequent plays were stopped for no gain, and Tech punted for the first time in the game.

The kick was stopped at the State five-yard line, and with 3:56 remaining in the first quarter, State was pinned deep in its half of the field. After a running play gained four yards, State earned a first down at the 11-yard line with a seven-yard pass. After the first down, Rix fumbled the ball, recovered it, and was sacked by the Tech defense at the State nine-yard line. Two long rushing plays made up the lost yardage, and State earned a first down at their 27-yard line. From there, Rix completed a 44-yard pass to Javon Walker for a first down at the Tech 29-yard line. In the final seconds of the quarter, Rix attempted a touchdown pass, but the ball fell incomplete. With one quarter elapsed, Virginia Tech led, 3–0.

=== Second quarter ===
The second quarter of the Gator Bowl began with the Seminoles facing third down and 12 from the Virginia Tech 30-yard line. The first play of the quarter resulted in the third Virginia Tech sack of the game as Nathaniel Adibi tackled Rix for a long loss. The sack pushed Florida State out of field goal range, and the Seminoles punted. The ball bounced out of bounds at the Tech 11-yard line, and the Hokies began their first possession of the second quarter. After a running play that was stopped for no gain, Noel completed a 20-yard pass to Slowikowski for a first down at their 31-yard line. Tech fumbled on the first play after the first down, Noel threw an incomplete pass, were pushed back five yards by a false start penalty, then had a first-down run negated by a 10-yard holding penalty. Tech was unable to gain a first down after the penalties, and punted.

With 11:23 remaining in the first half, Florida State returned the kick to its 18-yard line and began its first full possession of the second quarter. After a running play was stopped for no gain, Florida State gained a first down on a short pass and a short run. After a 10-yard holding penalty against the Seminoles, Rix scrambled for eight yards and completed a 19-yard pass for a first down at the 50-yard line. After Rix gained five yards on another scramble, he threw two incomplete passes and the Seminoles punted. The ball rolled into the end zone, and Tech's offense began a drive at its 20-yard line with 7:43 remaining in the first quarter.

Two incomplete passes and a one-yard run later, Tech prepared to punt the ball away. During the kick, Florida State's defense broke through the Virginia Tech offensive line and blocked the kick. The ball rolled inside the one-yard line, where Florida State's offense took over. On the first play after the block, Rix leaped across the goal line for the game's first touchdown. The extra point attempt was a success, and with 6:32 remaining in the first half, Florida State took a 7–3 lead.

The post-score kickoff was returned to the Tech 34-yard line, and the Hokies began another drive. Two rushing plays resulted in a first down for the Hokies at their 49-yard line. The Hokies were unable to enter Florida State's half of the field, however, as two incomplete passes and a running play resulted in a loss of yardage. Florida State's offense returned to the game at their 30-yard line following the kick with 4:17 remaining in the first half.

On the first play of the drive, Rix completed a 42-yard pass to Craphonso Thorpe. On the next play, the Seminoles advanced the ball 11 more yards on a running play. From the Tech 18-yard line, the Seminoles were stopped for no gain, endured a sack of Rix, then committed a five-yard false start penalty. After being pushed back to the Tech 34-yard line, the Seminoles were unable to get a first down and elected to try a long field goal kick. Florida State placekicker Xavier Beitia entered the game to attempt a 50-yard kick. The kick was successful, and with 1:27 remaining in the first half, Florida State extended its lead to 10–3.

After Virginia Tech went three-and-out, the Hokies punted to Florida State, who proceeded to run out the remaining seconds on the clock. The first half ended with Florida State leading, 10–3.

=== Third quarter ===
Because Florida State received the ball to begin the game, Virginia Tech received the ball to begin the second half. Florida State's kickoff was returned to their 29-yard line, and Virginia Tech's offense had the first possession of the second half. Jones rushed for six yards, then Noel completed a first-down pass to Andre Davis at the Florida State 45-yard line. The Seminoles sacked Noel, but Noel regained the lost yardage and earned a first down with a completed pass to the 20-yard line. Three Tech rushes advanced the ball to the nine-yard line and earned a first down. Two plays later, Jones dashed across the goal line for the first Tech touchdown of the game. The extra point kick was good, and Tech tied the score, 10–10, with 10:02 remaining in the third quarter.

Florida State received the Tech kickoff and returned it to their 23-yard line. After an incomplete pass from Rix, Virginia Tech's defense was caught offsides, resulting in a five-yard gain for Florida State. A short run after the penalty gained a first down, but on the first play after the first down, the Seminoles fumbled the ball. The loose ball was recovered by Virginia Tech's defense, and the Hokies began their second possession of the second half at the State 31-yard line. Tech was unable to capitalize on the field position, however. Noel threw an incomplete pass, was sacked, then threw a pass for a loss of yardage. Tech punted the ball, which was downed at the Florida State 12-yard line.

The Seminoles' second possession of the second half began with more success than their first possession. State gained a first down on two running plays, then Rix completed a 14-yard pass for another first down. Now at their 36-yard line, the Seminoles advanced the ball for short ground gains on the next two plays, then Rix completed a 30-yard pass to Bell. Following the pass and first down, the Seminoles were at the Tech 34-yard line. Two short gains and an incomplete pass failed to gain another first down, so State head coach Bobby Bowden ordered kicker Beitia into the game to attempt a 47-yard field goal. The kick attempt was successful, and Beitia gave Florida State a 13–10 lead with 1:42 remaining in the quarter.

Following Florida State's kickoff and a 38-yard return, Virginia Tech's offense began work at its 45-yard line. On the second play of the drive, Noel completed a 55-yard pass to Andre Davis, who ran into the end zone for Virginia Tech's second touchdown of the game. The extra point kick was good, and Virginia Tech regained the lead, 17–13, with 40 seconds remaining in the quarter.

Virginia Tech kicked the ball off, and Florida State returned the kick 12 yards to its 18-yard line. The Seminoles gained five yards on two rushing plays before time ran out on the quarter, which ended with Virginia Tech leading, 17–13.

=== Fourth quarter ===
The fourth quarter began with Florida State in possession of the ball and facing a third down and five yards. On the first play of the quarter, Rix was hit by a Virginia Tech defender, but not before he released a 77-yard pass to Walker, who ran into the end zone for a touchdown. The extra point try was good, and Florida State regained the lead, 20–17, with 14:48 remaining in the game.

Florida State's post-score kickoff sailed through the end zone for a touchback, and Tech's offense began its first drive of the quarter from its 20-yard line. Tech's first play of the quarter was a 15-yard completed pass by Noel for a first down. That was followed by an 11-yard run by Jones for another first down. After an incomplete pass, Noel ran for a first down at the State 41-yard line. Inside Florida State territory, gaining ground became much more difficult. The next three plays netted Tech only nine yards, setting up a critical fourth-and-one play. With Virginia Tech outside field goal range and trailing, the Hokies needed another first down to move within potential scoring range. But on fourth down, Jones was stopped for no gain on a running play, and the Hokies turned the ball over on downs. The play later was cited as the game's turning point.

After the turnover, Florida State received the ball at its 32-yard line with a 20–17 lead and 12:08 remaining in the game. On the first play after the turnover, Rix completed a 51-yard pass to Walker for a first down at the Tech 18-yard line. The three plays that followed netted only three yards, and Beitia was sent into the game to attempt a 35-yard field goal. The kick ricocheted off one of the uprights but through the goal posts, extending the Seminoles' lead to 23–17 with 10:13 remaining in the game.

Florida State's kickoff was fielded inside the Virginia Tech five-yard line and returned to the Tech eight-yard line. Tech gained five yards on two running plays, then Noel completed a 15-yard pass to Davis for a first down at the Tech 28-yard line. Noel and Jones each carried the ball, together gaining enough for a first down at the Tech 39-yard line. A completed pass and a short run by Jones resulted in another first down, this time at the 50-yard line. Florida State committed a five-yard offsides penalty, but the Hokies were unable to gain a first down on the Seminoles' side of the field. Rather than attempt to convert another fourth down, the Hokies punted the ball.

The kick was downed by Virginia Tech at the State 22-yard line with 5:22 remaining in the game. On the first play of the drive, Jones gained 13 yards and a first down at the 45-yard line of Florida State. This was followed by a 22-yard run and a first down by Jones at the Tech 33-yard line. Three more runs by Jones gained another nine yards, but rather than attempt a field goal, Bowden ordered his offense to attempt to convert the first down. A quarterback sneak resulted in just enough of a gain for a first down, and State's drive continued. On the first play after the conversion, Rix completed a 23-yard pass to Walker for a touchdown. The score and subsequent extra point gave State a 30–17 lead with 2:14 remaining in the game.

Virginia Tech returned Florida State's kickoff to their 23-yard line. After an incomplete pass, the Hokies gained a first down at their 33-yard line with a short pass. After the first down, Noel was sacked on successive plays. During the second sack, Florida State lineman Darnell Dockett collided with Noel's helmet, twisting Dockett's knee. Following the injury, Tech sent in backup quarterback Bryan Randall to attempt a long pass. The pass was intercepted by Florida State with 19 seconds remaining in the game. Following the interception, the Seminoles ran out the clock and secured a 30–17 win.

== Statistical summary ==
Statistical comparison
| | FSU | VT |
|---|---|---|
| 1st downs | 19 | 16 |
| Total yards | 430 | 312 |
| Passing yards | 326 | 269 |
| Rushing yards | 104 | 43 |
| Penalties | 4–25 | 4–30 |
| Punts | 4–40.5 | 7–29.9 |
| Turnovers | 2 | 2 |
| Time of possession | 28:51 | 31:09 |

In recognition of their performances during the game, Florida Statewide receiver Javon Walker was named the most valuable player of the winning team, and Virginia Tech wide receiver André Davis was named the most valuable player of the losing team. Walker finished the game with 195 receiving yards on just four receptions, an average of almost 50 yards—half the field—per reception. On the opposite side of the ball, Davis caught five passes for 158 yards, an average of more than 31 yards per catch.

The two teams' quarterbacks benefited from their receivers' success in eluding the opposing defenses. Florida State quarterback Chris Rix completed 12 of his 25 pass attempts for two touchdowns, 269 yards, and one interception. Rix also ran the ball 12 times during the game. Although he lost a total of 19 yards, one of his positive rushes resulted in a rushing touchdown. Despite that score, the game marked the first time all season that Rix had been held to negative rushing yardage. For Virginia Tech, quarterback Grant Noel completed 15 of 27 pass attempts for 269 yards and a touchdown. Backup quarterback Bryan Randall threw an interception on his only pass attempt of the game, and wide receiver Richard Johnson's trick pass attempt fell incomplete.

On the ground, Florida State running back Greg Jones led all players with 23 carries for 120 yards. Virginia Tech running back Kevin Jones was second in overall rushing, having carried the ball 23 times for 55 yards and a touchdown. Defensively, Florida State had 12 tackles for loss, causing the Hokies negating 66 yards of offense. Virginia Tech had eight tackles for loss, encompassing 48 yards of loss. Five of Virginia Tech's tackles for loss were sacks, while four of Florida State's tackles for loss were sacks.

Beitia's three successful field goals tied a Gator Bowl record. Rix's 326 passing yards were the sixth-most recorded in Gator Bowl history to that point, and Javon Walker's 195 receiving yards were the second-most ever recorded in a Gator Bowl. The 77-yard pass from Rix to Walker was the third-longest in Gator Bowl history. On the opposite side of the ball, Davis' 158 receiving yards were the ninth-most recorded in Gator Bowl history, and his 55-yard reception from Noel was the ninth-longest in Gator Bowl history. The two receivers' totals also were Virginia Tech bowl-game records: in one case, for receiving yards gained by a single player, in the other, for receiving yards allowed by a single player.

== Postgame effects ==
Florida State's victory raised it to a final record of 8–4, and Virginia Tech's loss brought it also to a final record of 8–4. Following the loss, the Hokies had a 5–10 record in bowl games, including 1–3 in the Gator Bowl and 4–5 in bowl games under head coach Frank Beamer. Florida State's victory gave Seminoles head coach Bobby Bowden the 322nd win of his career, tying him for second in the overall Division I career wins list with Bear Bryant.

=== 2002 NFL draft ===
Because of their strong performance in college and during the 2002 Gator Bowl, several players from each team were selected to play in the National Football League during the 2002 NFL draft. Florida State had three players selected, led by wide receiver Javon Walker, who was picked in the first round (20th overall) by the Green Bay Packers. Following Walker were defensive back Chris Hope (94th) and Milford Brown, who was taken in the supplemental draft by the expansion Houston Texans. In addition to the Seminoles who were drafted, Florida State running back Eric Shelton transferred from the team because of a lack of playing time. Virginia Tech had eight players selected in the 2002 draft. The first of these was wide receiver Andre Davis, who was selected in the second round (47th overall), by the Cleveland Browns. Following Davis were linebacker Ben Taylor (111th), defensive back Kevin McAdam (148th), David Pugh (182nd), Bob Slowikowski (211th), Chad Beasley (218th), Derrius Monroe (224th), and Jarrett Ferguson (251st).

=== Coaching changes ===
Following the Gator Bowl loss, Virginia Tech offensive coordinator and quarterbacks coach Rickey Bustle became the head coach at Louisiana-Lafayette as had been announced prior to the game. His position offensive coordinator was filled by then-offensive line coach Bryan Stinespring. To fill the quarterbacks coach position vacated by Bustle, Tech hired former Notre Dame offensive coordinator Kevin Rogers.
