= Bobby Bowden =

American football player and coach (1929–2021)

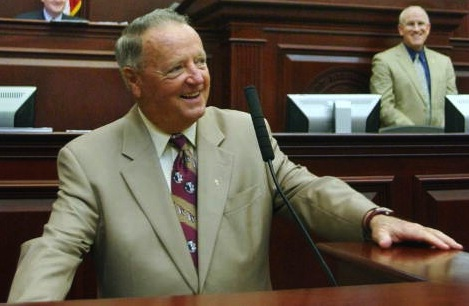
- Bowden in 2007

Biographical details
- Born: November 8, 1929; Birmingham, Alabama, U.S.
- Died: August 8, 2021 (aged 91); Tallahassee, Florida, U.S.

Playing career

Football
- 1948: Alabama
- 1949–1952: Howard (AL)

Baseball
- 1952: Howard (AL)

Track and field
- 1951: Howard (AL)
- Positions: Quarterback (football); Right fielder (baseball)

Coaching career (HC unless noted)

Football
- 1953–1954: Howard (AL) (backfield)
- 1955–1958: South Georgia
- 1959–1962: Howard (AL)
- 1963–1965: Florida State (WR)
- 1966–1969: West Virginia (OC)
- 1970–1975: West Virginia
- 1976–2009: Florida State

Baseball
- 1956–1959: South Georgia

Track and field
- 1953–1955: Howard (AL)

Head coaching record
- Overall: 377–129–4 (college football) (Note: 12 wins vacated; Bowden has a total of 411 wins as head coach. His 22 wins from South Georgia State College are also not counted by the NCAA.)
- Bowls: 21–10–1 (college) (Note: 1 bowl win vacated.)

Accomplishments and honors

Championships
- Football; 2 National (1993, 1999); 12 ACC (1992–2000, 2002–2003, 2005); 2 ACC Atlantic Division (2005, 2008)

Awards
- Football; Bobby Dodd COY (1980); Walter Camp Coach of the Year Award (1991); Amos Alonzo Stagg Award (2011)
- College Football Hall of Fame; Inducted in 2006 (profile)

Robert Cleckler Bowden (/ˈbaʊdən/; November 8, 1929 – August 8, 2021) was an American college football coach. Bowden coached the Florida State Seminoles of Florida State University (FSU) from 1976 to 2009 and is considered one of the greatest college football coaches of all time for his accomplishments with the team.

During his time at Florida State, Bowden led FSU to consensus national championships in 1993 and 1999, as well as twelve Atlantic Coast Conference championships once FSU joined the conference in 1991. Bowden's Seminoles finished as an AP top-5 team for 14 consecutive seasons, setting a record which doubled the closest program. However, the program weakened during the mid-2000s, and after a difficult 2009 season Bowden was forced to retire just weeks after his 80th birthday. He made his final coaching appearance in the 2010 Gator Bowl game on January 1, 2010, with a 33–21 victory over his former program, West Virginia.

Bowden spent the last part of his career in a race with his close friend, Joe Paterno, to become the winningest NCAA Division I college football coach of all time. The coaches overtook each other throughout the 2000s, sitting just a game apart before the 2008 college football season. However, on March 6, 2009, an NCAA ruling required Florida State to "vacate wins for any games in which an ineligible player participated", threatening to remove as many as fourteen of Bowden's wins from the 2006 and 2007 seasons in relation to an academic scandal. Florida State appealed the ruling, but the NCAA upheld it on January 5, 2010. Upon final investigation by FSU, it was determined that Bowden was to vacate 12 wins, bringing his final career record to 377–129–4, second to Paterno's final tally of 409 wins.

== Early life and education ==
Bowden was born in Birmingham, Alabama, the son of Bob Bowden and Sunset (née Cleckler) Bowden. When he was 13 years old, Bowden was diagnosed with rheumatic fever, which led to a six-month hospital stay. After his discharge, Bowden was confined to his bed at home for just over a year. While ill, Bowden passed the time by listening to World War II news reports on the radio, which sparked his interest in World War II, which endured for the rest of his lifetime. Also around this time, he began to follow college football; he listened to University of Alabama football on Saturday mornings.

Bowden was an outstanding football player at Woodlawn High School in Birmingham, and accepted a scholarship to play for the University of Alabama as a quarterback. He then returned to Birmingham after only one semester and eloped with his high school sweetheart, Ann Estock, on April 1, 1949.

Bowden then transferred to Howard College, now known as Samford University, where he played football, baseball, ran track, and became a brother in Pi Kappa Alpha. In his junior year, he was elected president of Pi Kappa Alpha. In his senior year, he was re-elected as Pi Kappa Alpha president and became captain of the Samford football team, where he garnered "Little All-America" honors as quarterback. The Howard College faculty nominated him for Who's Who Among Students in American Universities & Colleges in recognition of his academic and athletic leadership. Bowden graduated from Howard in 1953.

== Early coaching career ==
Bowden graduated from Howard in 1953, and began his coaching career at his alma mater, that fall as an assistant football coach in charge of the backfield under Earl Gartman. He left Howard in 1955 to become athletic director as well as head football, baseball, and basketball coach at South Georgia College. After a losing basketball season, Bowden fired himself as head coach. His baseball teams at South Georgia won three consecutive state titles. Bowden then returned to Howard as head coach, where he compiled a 31–6 record between 1959 and 1962. In 1962, Bowden went to Florida State University as an assistant coach under head coach Bill Peterson. Bowden left Florida State in 1965 to go to West Virginia University (WVU) as an assistant under Jim Carlen. When Carlen left following the 1969 season to become head coach at Texas Tech, Bowden replaced him. Bowden then compiled a 42–26 record at WVU before returning to FSU as head coach in 1976.

During Bowden's first year as head coach at WVU, the football team of the state's other top-division school, Marshall University, was killed in a plane crash. He asked NCAA permission to wear Marshall jerseys and play Marshall's final game of the 1970 season against Ohio, but was denied. In memory of the victims of the crash, Mountaineers players put green crosses and the initials "MU" on their helmets. Bowden allowed Marshall's new head coach Jack Lengyel and his assistants access to game film and playbooks to acquaint themselves with the veer offense, a variation of the option offense which aids teams with weak offensive lines. Lengyel credits Bowden with helping the young Thundering Herd recover. Bowden reportedly became emotional while viewing the movie We Are Marshall, and has said that he was the original candidate for the Marshall head coaching job filled by crash victim Rick Tolley.

== Florida State ==
Bowden comments on his second season as head coach of Florida State in 1977

Bowden returned to Florida State in 1976, hired as head coach in January; fourteen years earlier in 1962, he had chosen to coach the FSU wide receivers because the climate was warmer in Tallahassee than in Morgantown, and because Tallahassee was closer to Birmingham, Alabama, where his mother and mother-in-law both lived. The Seminoles had a dismal 4–29 (.121) record over the previous three seasons (1973–75) and he planned to stay only briefly before taking a better job, perhaps at Alabama. Bowden's initial four-year contract at FSU in 1976 paid $37,500 annually, a minor increase of $2,500 over his 1975 salary at West Virginia, which only granted one-year contracts at the time.

Bowden was successful very quickly at Florida State. After his second year in 1977, Bowden faced rumors he would leave for another job; the team went 9–2, compared to the four wins total in the three seasons before Bowden. He said he would be content to finish his career at Florida State, however, and reportedly told another athletic-department employee he would "never coach anywhere north of Tallahassee". During 34 years as head coach he had only one losing season–his first, in 1976–and declined head coaching job offers from Alabama, Auburn, LSU, and the National Football League's Atlanta Falcons. From 1987 to 2000, the Seminoles finished every season with at least 10 wins and in the top 5 of the Associated Press College Football Poll, and won the national championship in 1993 and 1999. The team was particularly dominant after joining the Atlantic Coast Conference (ACC) in 1992, winning or sharing nine consecutive conference titles from 1992 to 2000, and only losing two conference games in that stretch. They were ranked in the AP Poll for all but three weeks from 1987 to 2005. This included 211 consecutive weeks from 1989 to 2001, the second-longest streak in college football history at the time.

Bowden's tenure crested with a third consecutive appearance in the national championship game after the 2000 season, a loss to Oklahoma in the 2001 Orange Bowl. They stumbled the following season, with the lowlight being an upset 41–9 loss to North Carolina in the third game of the season, only the third loss they had ever suffered in ACC play. They finished 8–4, the first time they had lost that many games in 15 years. It also marked the first time since joining the ACC where they did not win at least a share of the ACC title; indeed, their two losses in ACC play were as many as they had suffered in their first nine years in the league. From then on, Bowden notched one more appearance in the top 10 of a final media poll, in 2003–which was also the last time he won 10 games in a season.

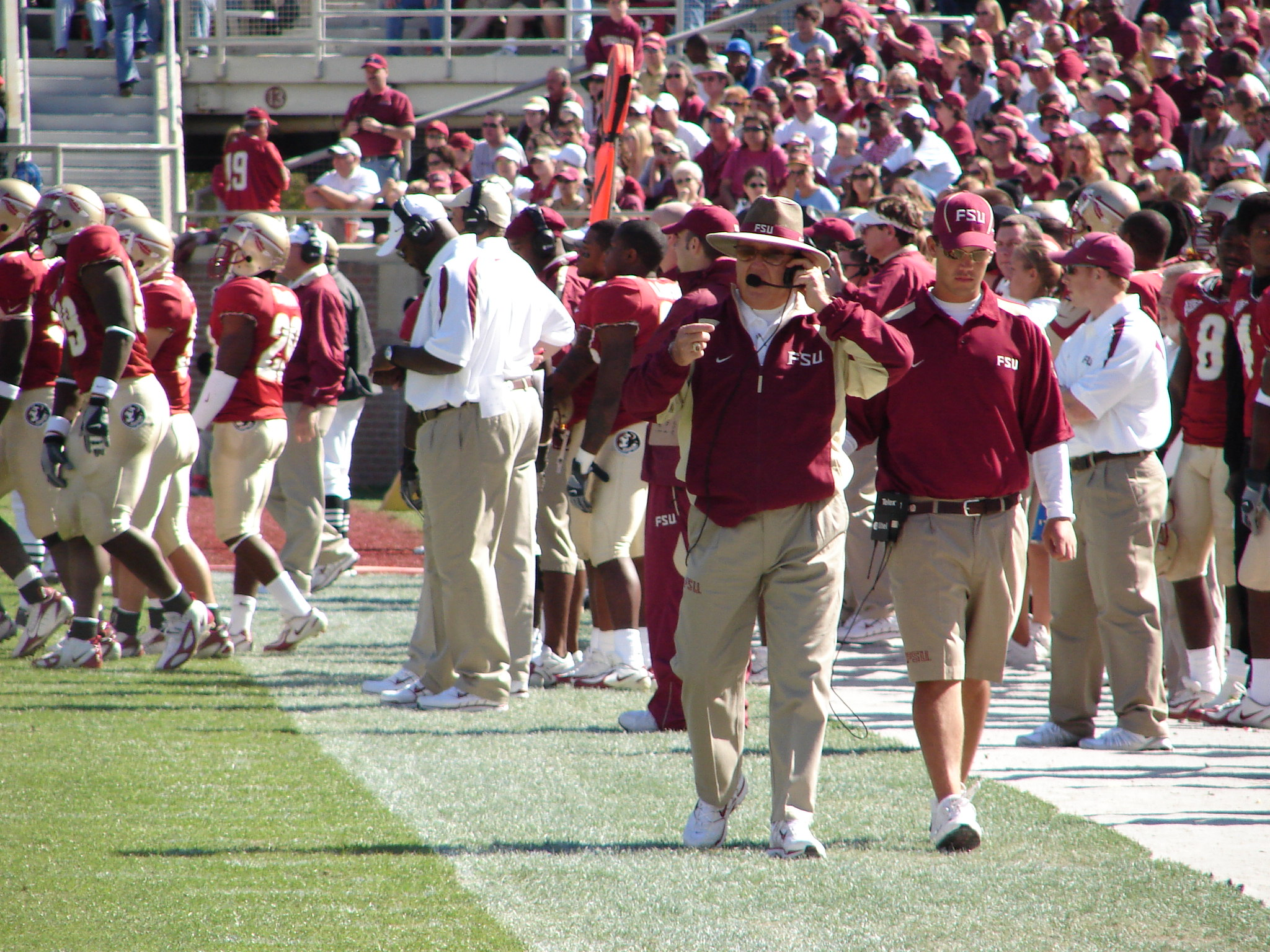
Bowden on the sidelines in 2006 against Virginia

In 2006, Florida State finished 7–6, its worst record since Bowden's first season. The Seminoles also suffered their first losing record in ACC play since joining the league. Following that season, LSU offensive coordinator Jimbo Fisher was hired to take the same post in Tallahassee. Following another 7–6 season in 2007, Fisher was designated as Bowden's successor, and was slated to take over the program no later than 2011. The Seminoles rebounded to 9–4 in 2008, but after barely qualifying for a bowl in 2009, Bowden was forced to announce his retirement effective at the end of the season.

=== The Bowden Bowl ===
Since both Florida State and Clemson are in the same division of the ACC for football, the two teams played each other every year from 1999 through 2007 in a game that became known as the "Bowden Bowl". Their 1999 meeting was the first time in Division I-A history that a father and a son met as opposing head coaches in a football game. Bobby held the edge in the series 5–4, with all four losses within the last five games.

One Bowden Bowl was scheduled between Auburn and Florida State for 1999 when Terry Bowden was the coach at Auburn. However, Terry's midseason resignation in 1998 ended the possibility of a Bowden Bowl. Another Bowden Bowl was scheduled between Clemson and Florida State in 2008, but Tommy Bowden's resignation halfway through the year ended the Bowden Bowls.

== Personal life ==
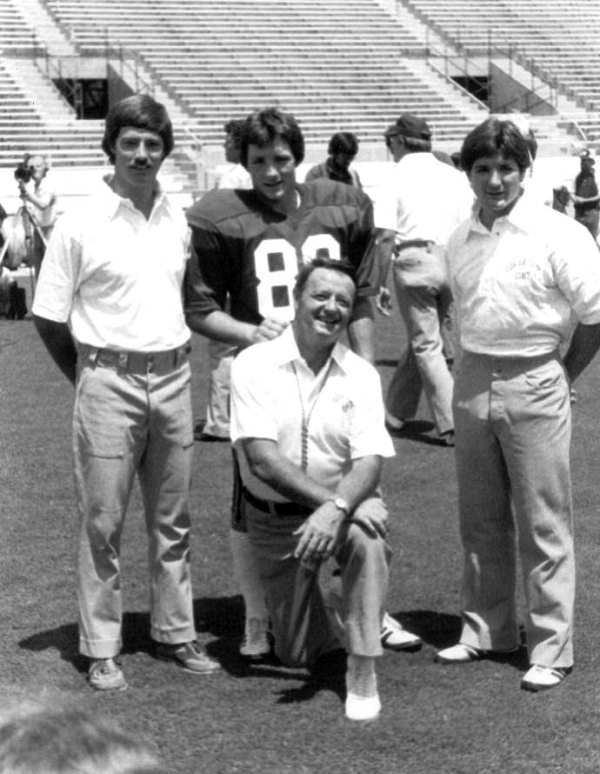
Bowden (kneeling) with sons Tommy, Jeff, and Terry

Bowden married Ann Estock, his childhood sweetheart, in 1949 and the couple raised six children and 21 grandchildren. Bowden was a Christian who credited his success in football to his faith.

Bowden was not the only member of his family to have coached Division I-A football. His son Tommy Bowden was the head coach at Clemson University. Another son, Terry Bowden, was the head coach at Auburn University, where he was the 1993 Coach of the Year. A third son, Jeff Bowden, was the offensive coordinator at Florida State. All three Bowden men who were head coaches have achieved an undefeated season: Terry in 1993 at Auburn; Tommy in 1998 at Tulane; and Bobby in 1999 at Florida State. Bobby's 1993 and 1999 Florida State teams were the only ones to win a national championship, however.

Bowden twice endorsed and supported U.S. President Donald Trump, in both the 2016 and 2020 presidential elections.

Bowden's first cousin once removed is journalist and author Mark Bowden.

== Illness and death ==
Bowden was diagnosed with COVID-19 in October 2020.

The following year, on July 21, 2021, it was reported that Bowden was diagnosed with a terminal medical condition. On July 23, his son reported that the condition was pancreatic cancer. On August 5, word began to filter from the Florida State faithful that Bowden was not doing well and his family was being told to gather. Bobby Bowden died on the morning of August 8, 2021.

He lay in honor in the rotunda of the Florida Capitol Building on August 13. He then lay repose at the Moore Athletic Center outside of Doak Campbell Stadium later that day. A memorial service was held for Bowden in the Tucker Civic Center in Tallahassee on August 14. Bowden then lay in repose in the Reid Chapel at Samford University on August 15, prior to burial in Trussville, Alabama. on August 16.

== Legacy ==
=== Awards received ===
Bowden was awarded the Bobby Dodd Coach of the Year Award for 1980. He received the Walter Camp Coach of the Year Award for 1991. In 1992 Bowden received the United States Sports Academy's Amos Alonzo Stagg Coaching Award in recognition of his outstanding achievement as a coach.

In 2004, the playing surface at Doak Campbell Stadium was named Bobby Bowden Field in Bowden's honor. The stadium's capacity more than doubled through four expansions under his watch, reflecting the Seminoles' rise.

=== Awards named after Bowden ===
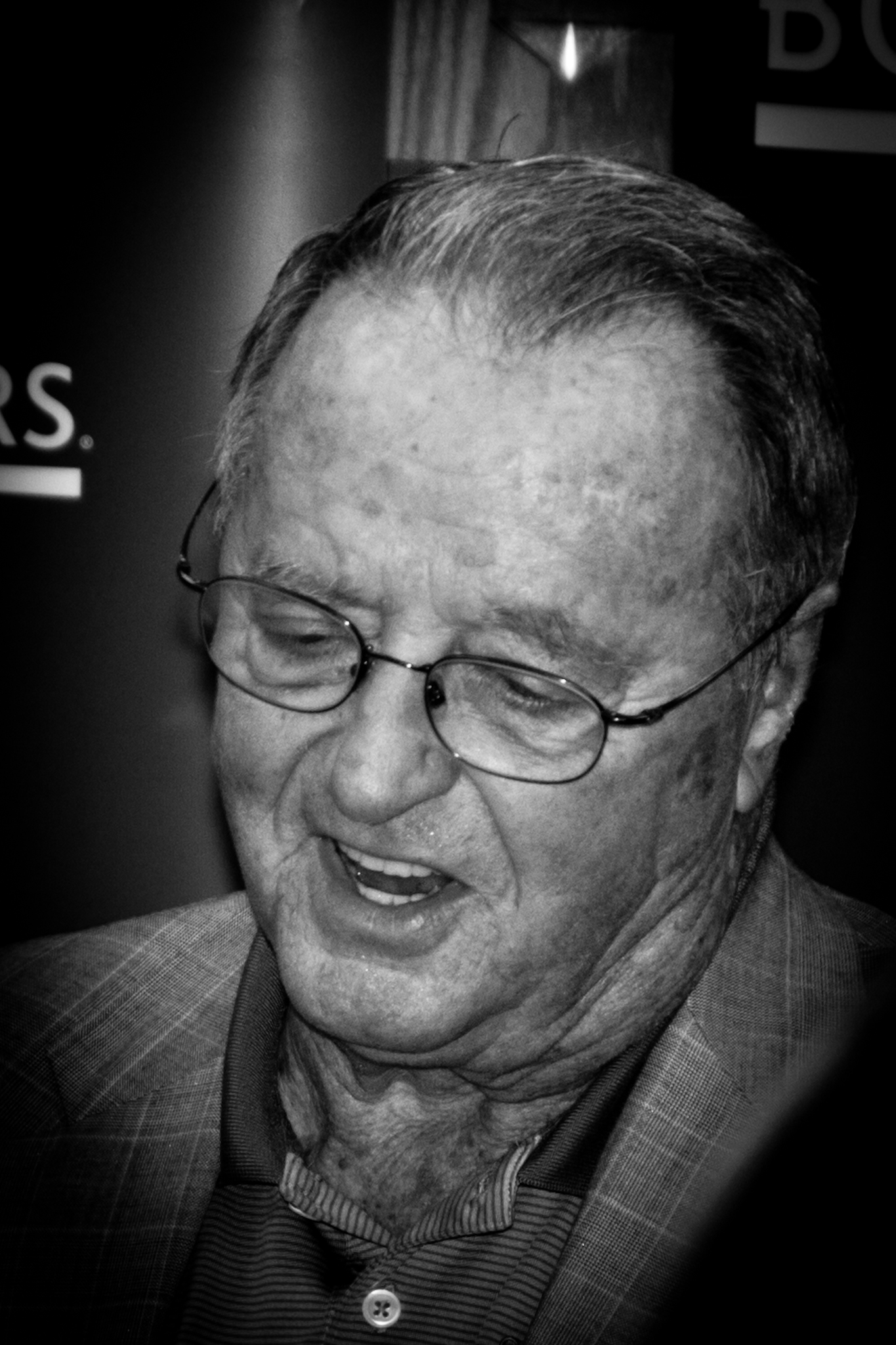
Bowden in September 2010

On March 21, 2010, the Over the Mountain Touchdown Club of Birmingham, Alabama presented the first annual Bobby Bowden National Collegiate Coach of the Year Award, named in honor of Bowden and the contributions that he made during his career. The award recognizes a coach each year with unmatched success on and off of the field in the same attributes that Bowden showed throughout his career: perseverance, attitude, integrity, and determination. University of Alabama head coach Nick Saban was the first recipient of the award, and it was presented by Bowden himself. The award is presented each year after national signing day and before the commencement of Spring practice.

In 2003, the Fellowship of Christian Athletes presented the first of what is now a yearly award in Bowden's name. The award was initiated by former Bowden assistant coach Vince Gibson and former Bowden player Vernon Brinson. It honors one college football player for his achievements on the field, in the classroom and in the community. In 2013, the Seminole Tribe of Florida became the official sponsor of the award. The Seminole Tribe of Florida Bobby Bowden Student-Athlete of the Year Award is presented each year prior to the College Football Playoff (CFP) national title.

In 2011, in recognition of his philanthropic efforts with the Fellowship of Christian Athletes, Bowden received the Children's Champion Award for Leadership Development from the charitable organization Children's Hunger Fund.

=== Infrastructure named after Bowden ===
On April 14, 2026, Florida Governor Ron DeSantis signed Florida Senate Bill 628 into law, officially renaming and designating Tallahassee International Airport to Bobby Bowden-Tallahassee International Airport. As of May 2026, the Florida Department of Transportation (FDOT) has updated all road signs and added Bowden’s name.

== Head coaching record ==
=== College football ===
In his 44 seasons as a college football head coach, Bowden had 40 winning seasons (including 33 consecutive at Florida State), and 36 Division I-A winning seasons. From 1987 through 2000, Bowden coached Florida State to 14 straight seasons with 10 or more victories, and his team had a final ranking in the top five of the major polls.

Year	Team	Overall	Conference	Standing	Bowl/playoffs	Coaches^{#}	AP^{°}
Howard Bulldogs (NCAA College Division independent) (1959–1962)
1959	Howard	9–1			W Textile Bowl		
1960	Howard	8–1					
1961	Howard	7–2					
1962	Howard	7–2			L Golden Isles Bowl		
Howard:		31–6					
West Virginia Mountaineers (NCAA University Division / Division I independent) (1970–1975)
1970	West Virginia	8–3					
1971	West Virginia	7–4					
1972	West Virginia	8–4			L Peach		
1973	West Virginia	6–5					
1974	West Virginia	4–7					
1975	West Virginia	9–3			W Peach	17	20
West Virginia:		42–26					
Florida State Seminoles (NCAA Division I / I-A independent) (1976–1991)
1976	Florida State	5–6					
1977	Florida State	10–2			W Tangerine	11	14
1978	Florida State	8–3					
1979	Florida State	11–1			L Orange	8	6
1980	Florida State	10–2			L Orange	5	5
1981	Florida State	6–5					
1982	Florida State	9–3			W Gator	10	13
1983	Florida State	8–4 (7–5) ^			W Peach		
1984	Florida State	7–3–2			T Florida Citrus	19	17
1985	Florida State	9–3			W Gator	13	15
1986	Florida State	7–4–1			W All-American	20	
1987	Florida State	11–1			W Fiesta	2	2
1988	Florida State	11–1			W Sugar	3	3
1989	Florida State	10–2			W Fiesta	2	3
1990	Florida State	10–2			W Blockbuster	4	4
1991	Florida State	11–2			W Cotton	4	4
Florida State Seminoles (Atlantic Coast Conference) (1992–2009)
1992	Florida State	11–1	8–0	1st	W Orange^{†}	2	2
1993	Florida State	12–1	8–0	1st	W Orange^{†}	1	1
1994	Florida State	10–1–1	8–0	1st	W Sugar^{†}	5	4
1995	Florida State	10–2	7–1	T–1st	W Orange^{†}	5	4
1996	Florida State	11–1	8–0	1st	L Sugar^{†}	3	3
1997	Florida State	11–1	8–0	1st	W Sugar^{†}	3	3
1998	Florida State	11–2	7–1	T–1st	L Fiesta^{†}	3	3
1999	Florida State	12–0	8–0	1st	W Sugar^{†}	1	1
2000	Florida State	11–2	8–0	1st	L Orange^{†}	4	5
2001	Florida State	8–4	6–2	2nd	W Gator	15	15
2002	Florida State	9–5	7–1	1st	L Sugar^{†}	23	21
2003	Florida State	10–3	7–1	1st	L Orange^{†}	10	11
2004	Florida State	9–3	6–2	2nd	W Gator	14	15
2005	Florida State	8–5	5–3	1st (Atlantic)	L Orange^{†}	23	22
2006	Florida State	7–6 ‡	3–5 ‡	5th (Atlantic)	W Emerald		
2007	Florida State	7–6 ‡	4–4 ‡	3rd (Atlantic)	L Music City		
2008	Florida State	9–4	5–3	T–1st (Atlantic)	W Champs Sports	23	21
2009	Florida State	7–6	4–4	3rd (Atlantic)	W Gator		
Florida State:		304–97–4	105–27				
Total:		377–129–4					
National championship Conference title Conference division title or championship game berth
^{†}Indicates Bowl Coalition, Bowl Alliance or BCS bowl.; ^{#}Rankings from final Coaches Poll.; ^{°}Rankings from final AP Poll.

^ The 1983 season includes a forfeit win vs. Tulane.
‡ For the 2006 and 2007 seasons 12 wins, including 6 conference wins, were vacated for use of ineligible players. 5 wins from 2006 (including 2 conference wins) and 7 wins from 2007 (including 4 conference wins) were ultimately vacated by the NCAA.

== Coaching tree ==
Assistant coaches under Bobby Bowden who became NCAA head coaches:

- Brad Scott
- Mark Richt
- Chuck Amato
- Tommy Bowden
- Terry Bowden
- Rick Stockstill
- Skip Holtz
- Kirby Smart
- Daryl Dickey
- Jimbo Fisher
- Manny Diaz

== Bibliography ==
Bobby Bowden has co-authored several books, including:

- Winning's Only Part of the Game: Lessons of Life and Football (1996) (ISBN 0-446-52050-0)
- The Bowden Way: 50 Years of Leadership Wisdom (2001) (ISBN 1-56352-684-0)
- Bobby Bowden's Tales from the Seminole Sideline (2004) (ISBN 1-58261-406-7)
- Called to Coach: Reflections on Life, Faith, and Football (2010) (ISBN 1-43919-597-8)

Books about Bobby Bowden's early coaching years:

- Bobby Bowden: Memories of a Legend and His Boys from South Georgia College (2008) (ISBN 978-1-58385-282-8)

Books about Bobby Bowden's entire career:

- Bobby Bowden: Win By Win (2003) (ISBN 0-7385-1544-2)
- Bowden: How Bobby Bowden Forged a Football Dynasty (2003) (ISBN 0-0614-7419-3)
- Pure Gold: Bobby Bowden – An Inside Look (2004) (ISBN 1-5967-0120-X)

Books that feature contributions from Bobby Bowden:

- Grateful: From Walking on to Winning It All at Florida State by Ryan Sprague, (2010) (ISBN 978-0-9828763-0-5)

== See also ==
- List of college football career coaching wins leaders
- List of College Football Hall of Fame inductees (coaches)
