= 1959 Northeast Louisiana State Indians football team =

American college football season

1959 Northeast Louisiana State Indians football
- Conference: Gulf States Conference
- Record: 2–8 (1–4 GSC)
- Head coach: Jack C. Rowan (2nd season)
- Home stadium: Brown Stadium

1959 Gulf States Conference football standings
	Conf.					Overall
Team	W		L		T	W		L		T
No. 7 Louisiana Tech $	5	–	0	–	0	9	–	1	–	0
McNeese State	2	–	3	–	0	6	–	3	–	0
Northwestern State	2	–	3	–	0	4	–	5	–	1
Southwestern Louisiana	2	–	3	–	0	4	–	5	–	0
Southeastern Louisiana	1	–	4	–	0	3	–	2	–	0
Northeast Louisiana State	1	–	4	–	0	2	–	8	–	0
$ – Conference champion; Rankings from NAIA poll

The 1959 Northeast Louisiana State Indians football team was an American football team that represented Northeast Louisiana State College (now known as the University of Louisiana at Monroe) in the Gulf States Conference during the 1959 college football season. In their second year under head coach Jack C. Rowan, the team compiled a 2–8 record.

== Schedule ==
Date	Opponent	Site	Result	Attendance	Source
September 19	at Arkansas State*	Kays Stadium; Jonesboro, AR	L 0–15	4,500	
September 26	Delta State*	Brown Stadium; Monroe, LA	L 13–14	4,000	
October 3	East Texas State*	Brown Stadium; Monroe, LA	L 0–20	3,500	
October 10	Arlington State*	Brown Stadium; Monroe, LA	W 26–21	3,500	
October 17	McNeese State	Brown Stadium; Monroe, LA	L 6–21	3,500	
October 24	Southeastern Louisiana	Brown Stadium; Monroe, LA	L 6–27	3,000	
October 31	Southwestern Louisiana	Brown Stadium; Monroe, LA (rivalry)	W 34–20	2,500	
November 7	at Northwestern State	Demon Stadium; Natchitoches, LA (rivalry)	L 19–24	3,500	
November 14	at Jacksonville State*	College Bowl; Jacksonville, AL	L 12–27	1,500	
November 21	at Louisiana Tech	Tech Stadium; Ruston, LA (rivalry)	L 0–27	7,500	
*Non-conference game
