= 1959 Sam Houston State Bearkats football team =

American college football season

1959 Sam Houston State Bearkats football
- Conference: Lone Star Conference
- Record: 5–5 (3–4 LSC)
- Head coach: Paul Pierce (8th season)
- Home stadium: Pritchett Field

1959 Lone Star Conference football standings
	Conf.					Overall
Team	W		L		T	W		L		T
No. 5 Texas A&I +^	6	–	1	–	0	12	–	1	–	0
No. 4 East Texas State +	6	–	1	–	0	9	–	1	–	0
Lamar Tech	4	–	3	–	0	8	–	3	–	0
Stephen F. Austin	4	–	3	–	0	4	–	6	–	1
Sam Houston State	3	–	4	–	0	5	–	5	–	0
Howard Payne	3	–	4	–	0	3	–	7	–	0
Southwest Texas State	2	–	5	–	0	4	–	6	–	0
Sul Ross	0	–	7	–	0	0	–	9	–	0
+ – Conference co-champions; ^ – NAIA playoff participant; Rankings from NAIA poll

The 1959 Sam Houston State Bearkats football team represented Sam Houston State Teachers College (now known as Sam Houston State University) as a member of the Lone Star Conference (LSC) during the 1959 NAIA football season. Led by eighth-year head coach Paul Pierce, the Bearkats compiled an overall record of 5–5 with a mark of 3–4 in conference play, and finished tied for fifth in the LSC.

== Schedule ==
Date	Opponent	Site	Result	Attendance	Source
September 19	Southwestern State (OK)*	Pritchett Field; Huntsville, TX	W 31–6	3,500	
September 25	at Southwestern Louisiana*	McNaspy Stadium; Lafayette, LA	L 7–19	5,000	
October 3	at Arlington State*	Memorial Stadium; Arlington, TX	W 3–0		
October 10	Howard Payne	Pritchett Field; Huntsville, TX	W 13–7	5,000–7,000	
October 17	at No. 7 East Texas State	Memorial Stadium; Commerce, TX	L 0–14	6,000	
October 24	Texas A&I	Pritchett Field; Huntsville, TX	L 10–23	3,000	
October 31	at Southwest Texas State	Evans Field; San Marcos, TX	L 14–18	5,000	
November 7	Sul Ross	Pritchett Field; Huntsville, TX	W 22–0	1,000	
November 14	at Stephen F. Austin	Memorial Stadium; Nacogdoches, TX (rivalry)	W 6–0		
November 21	Lamar Tech	Pritchett Field; Huntsville, TX	L 14–27	6,000	
*Non-conference game; Rankings from UPI Poll released prior to the game
