= 1959 Memphis State Tigers football team =

American college football season

1959 Memphis State Tigers football
- Conference: Independent
- Record: 6–4
- Head coach: Billy J. Murphy (2nd season)
- Captains: Lee; John
- Home stadium: Crump Stadium

1959 Southern non-major college football independents records
	Conf.			Overall
Team	W	L	T	W		L		T
Howard (AL)		–		9	–	1	–	0
Louisville		–		6	–	4	–	0
Memphis State		–		6	–	4	–	0
Mississippi Southern		–		6	–	4	–	0
Arlington State		–		4	–	3	–	0
Sewanee		–		4	–	3	–	1
Abilene Christian		–		5	–	5	–	0
Washington and Lee		–		3	–	4	–	1
Arkansas State		–		3	–	6	–	0
Trinity (TX)		–		3	–	6	–	0
Chattanooga		–		3	–	7	–	0
Tampa		–		3	–	7	–	0

The 1959 Memphis State Tigers football team represented Memphis State College (now known as the University of Memphis) as an independent during the 1959 college football season. In its second season under head coach Billy J. Murphy, the team compiled an 6–4 record. The team played its home games at Crump Stadium in Memphis, Tennessee.

== Schedule ==
Date	Opponent	Rank	Site	Result	Attendance	Source
September 19	Stephen F. Austin		Crump Stadium; Memphis, TN	W 25–6	13,037	
September 26	Tennessee Tech	No. 14	Crump Stadium; Memphis, TN	W 14–3	8,483	
October 3	at No. 3 (major) Ole Miss	No. 11	Hemingway Stadium; Oxford, MS	L 0–43	12,500	
October 10	Abilene Christian		Crump Stadium; Memphis, TN	W 13–7	8,100	
October 17	Florida State^{†}	No. T–14	Crump Stadium; Memphis, TN	W 16–6	9,536	
October 24	at Mississippi State		Scott Field; Starkville, MS	L 23–28	16,000	
October 31	at No. 1 Mississippi Southern	No. 15	Faulkner Field; Hattiesburg, MS (rivalry)	W 21–6	9,536	
November 14	at T–14 Louisiana Tech	No. 7	Tech Stadium; Ruston, LA	L 8–10	5,500	
November 21	at No. 17 (UD) Alabama	No. 8	Denny Stadium; Tuscaloosa, AL	L 7–14	30,200	
November 26	at Chattanooga	No. 7	Chamberlain Field; Chattanooga, TN	W 15–9	7,000–8,000	
^{†}Homecoming; Rankings from UPI Poll released prior to the game
