= 1959 Mississippi Southern Southerners football team =

American college football season

1959 Mississippi Southern Southerners football
- Conference: Independent
- Record: 6–4
- Head coach: Thad Vann (11th season)
- Home stadium: Faulkner Field; Ladd Stadium

1959 Southern non-major college football independents records
	Conf.			Overall
Team	W	L	T	W		L		T
Howard (AL)		–		9	–	1	–	0
Louisville		–		6	–	4	–	0
Memphis State		–		6	–	4	–	0
Mississippi Southern		–		6	–	4	–	0
Arlington State		–		4	–	3	–	0
Sewanee		–		4	–	3	–	1
Abilene Christian		–		5	–	5	–	0
Washington and Lee		–		3	–	4	–	1
Arkansas State		–		3	–	6	–	0
Trinity (TX)		–		3	–	6	–	0
Chattanooga		–		3	–	7	–	0
Tampa		–		3	–	7	–	0

The 1959 Mississippi Southern Southerners football team was an American football team that represented Mississippi Southern College (now known as the University of Southern Mississippi) as an independent during the 1959 college football season. In their eleventh year under head coach Thad Vann, the team compiled a 6–4 record.

== Schedule ==
Date	Opponent	Rank	Site	Result	Attendance	Source
September 26	Trinity (TX)	No. 1	Faulkner Field; Hattiesburg, MS	W 29–8	12,500	
October 3	Texas A&M	No. 1	Ladd Stadium; Mobile, AL	L 3–7	25,781	
October 10	Southeastern Louisiana	No. 1	Faulkner Field; Hattiesburg, MS	W 26–6	12,200	
October 17	at West Texas State	No. 1	Buffalo Bowl; Canyon, TX	W 37–6	5,000	
October 24	Abilene Christian^{†}	No. 1	Faulkner Field; Hattiesburg, MS	W 30–10	14,200	
October 31	at No. 15 Memphis State	No. 1	Crump Stadium; Memphis, TN (rivalry)	L 6–21	9,262	
November 7	NC State	No. 2	Ladd Stadium; Mobile, AL	W 19–14	12,000	
November 14	Chattanooga	No. 2	Faulkner Field; Hattiesburg, MS	W 14–6	7,100	
November 21	at No. 12 (major) Auburn	No. 2	Cliff Hare Stadium; Auburn, AL	L 7–28	20,300	
November 28	at No. 8 Louisiana Tech	No. 2	Tech Stadium; Ruston, LA (rivalry)	L 0–16	7,000	
^{†}Homecoming; Rankings from UPI Poll released prior to the game
