= 1959 Lamar Tech Cardinals football team =

American college football season

1959 Lamar Tech Cardinals football
- Conference: Lone Star Conference
- Record: 8–3 (4–3 LSC)
- Head coach: James B. Higgins (7th season)
- Home stadium: Greenie Stadium

1959 Lone Star Conference football standings
	Conf.					Overall
Team	W		L		T	W		L		T
No. 5 Texas A&I +^	6	–	1	–	0	12	–	1	–	0
No. 4 East Texas State +	6	–	1	–	0	9	–	1	–	0
Lamar Tech	4	–	3	–	0	8	–	3	–	0
Stephen F. Austin	4	–	3	–	0	4	–	6	–	1
Sam Houston State	3	–	4	–	0	5	–	5	–	0
Howard Payne	3	–	4	–	0	3	–	7	–	0
Southwest Texas State	2	–	5	–	0	4	–	6	–	0
Sul Ross	0	–	7	–	0	0	–	9	–	0
+ – Conference co-champions; ^ – NAIA playoff participant; Rankings from NAIA poll

The 1959 Lamar Tech Cardinals football team represented Lamar State College of Technology—now known as Lamar University—as a member of the Lone Star Conference (LSC) during the 1959 college football season. Led by seventh-year head coach James B. Higgins, the Cardinals compiled an overall record of 8–3 with a mark of 4–3 in conference play conference, tying for third place in the LSC.

== Schedule ==
Date	Opponent	Rank	Site	Result	Attendance	Source
September 12	at South Dakota*		Inman Field; Vermillion, SD	W 41–9	2,000	
September 19	Louisiana Tech*		Greenie Stadium; Beaumont, TX	W 13–6	6,500	
September 26	vs. Northwestern State*	No. 17	Yellow Jacket Stadium; Port Arthur, TX	W 19–0	7,000	
October 3	at Abilene Christian*	No. 18	Fair Park Stadium; Abilene, TX	W 8–7		
October 10	Stephen F. Austin	No. 14	Greenie Stadium; Beaumont, TX	W 7–6		
October 17	Sul Ross	No. 12	Greenie Stadium; Beaumont, TX	W 32–0		
October 24	at Southwest Texas State	No. T–11	Evans Field; San Marcos, TX	W 28–6		
October 31	Howard Payne	No. 9	Greenie Stadium; Beaumont, TX	L 12–14		
November 7	at Texas A&I	No. 12	Javelina Stadium; Kingsville, TX	L 6–14		
November 14	No. 5 East Texas State	No. 16	Greenie Stadium; Beaumont, TX	L 3–14		
November 21	at Sam Houston State		Pritchett Field; Huntsville, TX	W 27–14	6,000	
*Non-conference game; Rankings from UPI Poll released prior to the game
