= Virgil Ledbetter =

American football and baseball coach (1918–1967)

Biographical details
- Born: March 7, 1918; Dora, Alabama, U.S.
- Died: August 11, 1967 (aged 49)

Playing career

Football
- 1939–1942: Howard (AL)
- 1946: Arkansas State

Coaching career (HC unless noted)

Football
- 1956: Howard (AL) (assistant)
- 1957–1958: Howard (AL)
- 1959–1962: Howard (AL) (assistant)

Basketball
- 1955–1959: Howard (AL)
- 1963–1965: Howard (AL)

Baseball
- 1956–1965: Howard (AL)

Head coaching record
- Overall: 6–10–1 (football)

Virgil Chapel Ledbetter (March 7, 1918 – August 11, 1967) was an American college football, college basketball, and college baseball coach. He served as the head football coach at Samford University (then known as Howard University) in Homewood, Alabama from 1957 to 1958, compiling a record of 6–10–1. Ledbetter was also the school's head baseball coach from 1956 to 1965.

== Head coaching record ==
=== Football ===
Year	Team	Overall	Conference	Standing	Bowl/playoffs
Howard Bulldogs (Independent) (1957–1958)
1957	Howard	4–5			
1958	Howard	1–5–1			
Howard:		6–10–1			
Total:		6–10–1			
