= 1959 Tampa Spartans football team =

American college football season

1959 Tampa Spartans football
- Conference: Independent
- Record: 3–7
- Head coach: Marcelino Huerta (8th season)
- Home stadium: Phillips Field

1959 Southern non-major college football independents records
	Conf.			Overall
Team	W	L	T	W		L		T
Howard (AL)		–		9	–	1	–	0
Louisville		–		6	–	4	–	0
Memphis State		–		6	–	4	–	0
Mississippi Southern		–		6	–	4	–	0
Arlington State		–		4	–	3	–	0
Sewanee		–		4	–	3	–	1
Abilene Christian		–		5	–	5	–	0
Washington and Lee		–		3	–	4	–	1
Arkansas State		–		3	–	6	–	0
Trinity (TX)		–		3	–	6	–	0
Chattanooga		–		3	–	7	–	0
Tampa		–		3	–	7	–	0

The 1959 Tampa Spartans football team represented the University of Tampa in the 1959 college football season. It was the Spartans' 23rd season. The team was led by head coach Marcelino Huerta, in his eighth year, and played their home games at Phillips Field in Tampa, Florida. They finished with a record of three wins and seven losses (3–7).

== Schedule ==
Date	Opponent	Site	Result	Attendance	Source
September 26	Troy State	Phillips Field; Tampa, FL	W 35–15	4,500–6,500	
October 3	Western Carolina	Phillips Field; Tampa, FL	L 8–19	4,000	
October 10	at McNeese State	Wildcat Stadium; Lake Charles, LA	L 14–27	4,500	
October 17	at Wofford	Snyder Field; Spartanburg, SC	L 7–14	4,500	
October 24	Presbyterian	Phillips Field; Tampa, FL	L 0–27	5,000	
October 31	vs. Southeastern Louisiana	Tiger Stadium; Pensacola, FL	L 8–33	5,500	
November 7	Arkansas State^{†}	Phillips Field; Tampa, FL	W 14–13	3,500–6,000	
November 14	McMurry	Phillips Field; Tampa, FL	L 12–28	4,000	
November 21	Appalachian State	Phillips Field; Tampa, FL	W 23–6	4,000	
November 28	Florida State	Phillips Field; Tampa, FL	L 0–33	6,500	
^{†}Homecoming
