= 1958 Louisiana Tech Bulldogs football team =

American college football season

1958 Louisiana Tech Bulldogs football

GSC co-champion
- Conference: Gulf States Conference
- Record: 7–3 (4–1 GSC)
- Head coach: Joe Aillet (18th season)
- Captains: Jim McCabe; Buck Stewart; Allen Stough
- Home stadium: Tech Stadium

1958 Gulf States Conference football standings
	Conf.					Overall
Team	W		L		T	W		L		T
Northwestern State +	4	–	1	–	0	8	–	2	–	0
Louisiana Tech +	4	–	1	–	0	7	–	3	–	0
Northeast Louisiana State	3	–	2	–	0	6	–	3	–	0
McNeese State	2	–	3	–	0	5	–	5	–	0
Southeastern Louisiana	2	–	3	–	0	4	–	5	–	0
Southwestern Louisiana	0	–	5	–	0	1	–	8	–	0
+ – Conference co-champions

The 1958 Louisiana Tech Bulldogs football team was an American football team that represented the Louisiana Polytechnic Institute (now known as Louisiana Tech University) as a member of the Gulf States Conference during the 1958 college football season. In their eighteenth year under head coach Joe Aillet, the team compiled a 7–3 record and finished as Gulf States Conference co-champion.

== Schedule ==
Date	Opponent	Rank	Site	Result	Attendance	Source
September 20	at Mississippi Southern*		Faulkner Field; Hattiesburg, MS (rivalry)	L 0–14	7,500	
September 27	at Arkansas State*		Kays Stadium; Jonesboro, AR	W 14–7		
October 4	McNeese State		Tech Stadium; Ruston, LA	W 17–0	8,000	
October 11	at Southwestern Louisiana		McNaspy Stadium; Lafayette, LA (rivalry)	W 33–0	4,500	
October 18	vs. Northwestern State	No. T–20	State Fair Stadium; Shreveport, LA (rivalry)	L 14–18	22,000	
October 25	Arkansas A&M*		Tech Stadium; Ruston, LA	W 40–0		
November 1	at No. 12 Memphis State*		Crump Stadium; Memphis, TN	L 12–26	3,300	
November 8	Southeastern Louisiana		Tech Stadium; Ruston, LA	W 10–6		
November 15	McMurry*		Tech Stadium; Ruston, LA	W 20–12	5,000	
November 22	at Northeast Louisiana State		Brown Stadium; Monroe, LA (rivalry)	W 46–21	7,000	
*Non-conference game; Rankings from UPI Poll released prior to the game
