= 1959 Arlington State Rebels football team =

American college football season

1959 Arlington State Rebels football
- Conference: Independent
- Record: 4–3
- Head coach: Chena Gilstrap (7th season)
- Home stadium: Memorial Stadium

1959 Southern non-major college football independents records
| | Conf. | | | Overall |
| Team | W | L | T | W | | L | | T |
|---|---|---|---|---|---|---|---|---|
| Howard (AL) | | – | | 9 | – | 1 | – | 0 |
| Louisville | | – | | 6 | – | 4 | – | 0 |
| Memphis State | | – | | 6 | – | 4 | – | 0 |
| Mississippi Southern | | – | | 6 | – | 4 | – | 0 |
| Arlington State | | – | | 4 | – | 3 | – | 0 |
| Sewanee | | – | | 4 | – | 3 | – | 1 |
| Abilene Christian | | – | | 5 | – | 5 | – | 0 |
| Washington and Lee | | – | | 3 | – | 4 | – | 1 |
| Arkansas State | | – | | 3 | – | 6 | – | 0 |
| Trinity (TX) | | – | | 3 | – | 6 | – | 0 |
| Chattanooga | | – | | 3 | – | 7 | – | 0 |
| Tampa | | – | | 3 | – | 7 | – | 0 |

The 1959 Arlington State Rebels football team was an American football team that represented Arlington State College (now known as the University of Texas at Arlington) as an independent during the 1959 college football season. In their seventh year under head coach Chena Gilstrap, the team compiled a 4–3 record. In April 1959 the Texas legislature approved the transition of Arlington State from a two-year junior college, to a four-year senior college. As such, 1959 marked the first season the Rebels competed as an NCAA College Division independent.

== Schedule ==
| Date | Opponent | Site | Result | Attendance | Source |
|---|---|---|---|---|---|
| September 26 | Southeastern Oklahoma State | Memorial Stadium; Arlington, TX | W 28–0 | | |
| October 3 | Sam Houston State | Memorial Stadium; Arlington, TX | L 0–3 | | |
| October 10 | at Northeast Louisiana State | Brown Stadium; Monroe, LA | L 21–26 | 3,500 | |
| October 17 | at Texas A&I | Javelina Stadium; Kingsville, TX | L 18–29 | 6,000 | |
| October 24 | Texas Lutheran | Memorial Stadium; Arlington, TX | W 27–26 | | |
| November 14 | at Corpus Christi | Buc Stadium; Corpus Christi, TX | W 34–0 | 500 | |
| November 21 | Southwestern Oklahoma State | Memorial Stadium; Arlington, TX | W 28–7 | 5,500 | |
