= 1959 Louisiana Tech Bulldogs football team =

American college football season

1959 Louisiana Tech Bulldogs football

GSC champion
- Conference: Gulf States Conference
- Record: 9–1 (5–0 GSC)
- Head coach: Joe Aillet (19th season)
- Captains: Bill Bundrick; J. W. Slack
- Home stadium: Tech Stadium

1959 Gulf States Conference football standings
	Conf.					Overall
Team	W		L		T	W		L		T
No. 7 Louisiana Tech $	5	–	0	–	0	9	–	1	–	0
McNeese State	2	–	3	–	0	6	–	3	–	0
Northwestern State	2	–	3	–	0	4	–	5	–	1
Southwestern Louisiana	2	–	3	–	0	4	–	5	–	0
Southeastern Louisiana	1	–	4	–	0	3	–	2	–	0
Northeast Louisiana State	1	–	4	–	0	2	–	8	–	0
$ – Conference champion; Rankings from NAIA poll

The 1959 Louisiana Tech Bulldogs football team was an American football team that represented the Louisiana Polytechnic Institute (now known as Louisiana Tech University) as a member of the Gulf States Conference during the 1959 college football season. In their nineteenth year under head coach Joe Aillet, the team compiled a 9–1 record and finished as Gulf States Conference champion.

== Schedule ==
Date	Opponent	Rank	Site	Result	Attendance	Source
September 19	at Lamar Tech*		Greenie Stadium; Beaumont, TX	L 6–13	6,500	
September 26	Arkansas State*		Tech Stadium; Ruston, LA	W 35–0	7,000	
October 3	at McNeese State		Lake Charles H.S. Stadium; Lake Charles, LA	W 28–0	5,000	
October 10	Southwestern Louisiana	No. T–18	Tech Stadium; Ruston, LA (rivalry)	W 21–13	7,000	
October 24	vs. Northwestern State	No. 20	State Fair Stadium; Shreveport, LA (rivalry)	W 27–14	23,500	
October 31	at Naval Air Station Pensacola*	No. 13	Mainside Stadium; Pensacola, FL	W 7–0	2,500	
November 7	at Southeastern Louisiana	No. 20	Strawberry Stadium; Hammond, LA	W 14–0	6,000	
November 14	No. 7 Memphis State*	No. T–14	Tech Stadium; Ruston, LA	W 10–8	5,500	
November 21	Northeast Louisiana State	No. 10	Tech Stadium; Ruston, LA (rivalry)	W 27–0	7,500	
November 28	No. 2 Mississippi Southern*	No. 8	Tech Stadium; Ruston, LA (rivalry)	W 16–0	7,000	
*Non-conference game; Rankings from UPI Poll released prior to the game
