= Howard Bulldogs football, 1950–1959 =

American college football seasons

The Howard Bulldogs football program, 1950–1959 represented Howard College (now known as Samford University) during the 1950s in college football. During this time, the Bulldogs were led by five different head coaches and had an overall record for the decade of 30–54–4. From 1950 through 1954, Howard competed as a member of the Dixie Conference and from 1955 onwards they competed as an independent.

From 1950 to 1953, Earl Gartman served as head coach, and led the Bulldogs to an overall record of 10–23–1 during this time. During his tenure Bobby Bowden was his most notable player after he earned "Little All-America" honors as quarterback. William C. White previously served as head coach at Howard in the 1940s, returned to coach the Bulldogs for their 1954 season, and led the team to a 2–7 record. The 1954 season also marked the final one Howard played as a member of the Dixie Conference.

After White resigned as head coach in June 1955, former Howard player Howard Foote was selected as the next head coach of the Bulldogs. Foote led Howard to an overall record of 3–13–2, before he resigned in August 1957. Virgil Ledbetter was next appointed as head coach and let Howard to an overall record of 6–10–1 during his two seasons. In 1959, Bobby Bowden was appointed as head coach and led his alma mater to a 9–1 record, with a victory in the Textile Bowl over Gordon Military College in his first season as a collegiate head coach.

During the 1950s, Howard played their home game as several stadiums. From 1950 to 1956, their primary home field was Barry Field, which was located on their original campus in the East Lake neighborhood of Birmingham, Alabama. In 1957, the school relocated from East Lake to a new campus in Homewood, Alabama, and played the entirety of that season at Shades Valley H.S. Stadium prior to the opening of a new on-campus, Howard Stadium for their 1958 season. In the 1950s, Howard also played home games at Legion Field in Birmingham and at Hewitt High School Stadium in Trussville, Alabama.

== 1950 ==
1950 Howard Bulldogs football
- Conference: Dixie Conference
- Record: 2–8 (0–3 Dixie)
- Head coach: Earl Gartman (2nd season)
- Home stadium: Berry Field; Legion Field; Hewitt H.S. Stadium

The 1950 Howard Bulldogs football team was an American football team that represented Howard College (now known as Samford University) as a member of the Dixie Conference during the 1950 college football season. Led by second-year head coach Earl Gartman, the team compiled a 2–8 record. Howard played their home games on campus at Berry Field and at Legion Field in Birmingham, Alabama and at Hewitt High School Stadium in Trussville, Alabama.

At the conclusion of the season, several Howard players were named to the All-Dixie Conference Team. Players selected to the first team included Howard Foote at end, John Wade at tackle, and Bobby Bowden at back. Players selected to the second team included Carol Roberts at end, Charles Maze at guard, and both Tom Cutliff and George Pappas at back.

Schedule

Date	Opponent	Site	Result	Attendance	Source
September 23	at Western Kentucky*	Bowling Green, KY	L 0–13	2,500	
September 30	at Tennessee Tech*	Overhill Field; Cookeville, TN	L 6–61		
October 7	vs. Florence State*	Decatur Stadium; Decatur, AL	L 0–7		
October 14	at Florida State	Doak Campbell Stadium; Tallahassee, FL	L 6–20	5,537	
October 21	Southwestern (TN)*^{†}	Berry Field; Birmingham, AL	W 35–6	2,000	
October 27	at Union (TN)*	Rothrock Field; Jackson, TN	W 28–6		
November 4	Mississippi College	Hewitt High School Stadium; Trussville, AL	L 6–7	1,500	
November 11	vs. Troy State*	Municipal Stadium; Andalusia, AL	L 6–21		
November 18	at Millsaps	Tiger Stadium; Jackson, MS	L 7–18	3,000	
November 22	Jacksonville State*	Legion Field; Birmingham, AL (rivalry)	L 7–28	1,500	
*Non-conference game; ^{†}Homecoming

== 1951 ==
1951 Howard Bulldogs football
- Conference: Dixie Conference
- Record: 2–3–1 (1–1 Dixie)
- Head coach: Earl Gartman (3rd season)
- Home stadium: Berry Field

The 1951 Howard Bulldogs football team was an American football team that represented Howard College (now known as Samford University) as a member of the Dixie Conference during the 1951 college football season. Led by third-year head coach Earl Gartman, the team compiled a 2–3–1 record. Howard played their home games on campus at Berry Field in Birmingham, Alabama.

At the conclusion of the season, several Howard players were named to the All-Dixie Conference Team. Players selected to the first team on offense included Phil Powell at end, Jim Hearn at tackle, Ben Thompson at guard, Tom McClendon at halfback, and Bobby Bowden at quarterback. Players selected to the first team on defense included Charlie Maze at guard, Tom Laney at linebacker, and Wade Wallace.

Schedule

Date	Opponent	Site	Result	Attendance	Source
October 6	vs. Florence State*	Decatur Stadium; Decatur, AL	L 6–30	5,300	
October 13	at Mississippi College	Provine Field; Clinton, MS	W 19–6		
October 27	Union (TN)*	Berry Field; Birmingham, AL	W 41–0		
November 10	Millsaps^{†}	Berry Field; Birmingham, AL	L 14–27		
November 17	at Sewanee*	Hardee Field; Sewanee, TN	L 0–41	500	
November 21	at Jacksonville State*	College Bowl; Jacksonville, AL (rivalry)	T 19–19		
*Non-conference game; ^{†}Homecoming

== 1952 ==
1952 Howard Bulldogs football
- Conference: Dixie Conference
- Record: 5–4 (0–2 Dixie)
- Head coach: Earl Gartman (4th season)
- Home stadium: Berry Field; Shades Valley H.S. Stadium; Hewitt H.S. Stadium

The 1952 Howard Bulldogs football team was an American football team that represented Howard College (now known as Samford University) as a member of the Dixie Conference during the 1952 college football season. Led by fourth-year head coach Earl Gartman, the team compiled a 5–4 record. Howard played their home games on campus at Berry Field in Birmingham, Alabama, at Shades Valley High School Stadium in Homewood, Alabama, and at Hewitt High School Stadium in Trussville, Alabama.

At the conclusion of the season, several Howard players were named to the All-Dixie Conference Team. Players selected to the first team included Phil Powell and Johnny Howell at end, Charles Hern and Ben Bancroft at guard, Bent Thompson at center, Bobby Bowden at quarterback.

Schedule

Date	Opponent	Site	Result	Attendance	Source
September 27	vs. Troy State*	Andalusia Municipal Stadium; Andalusia, AL	L 16–25	4,500	
October 4	Sewanee*	Shades Valley High School Stadium; Homewood, AL	W 13–0	2,500	
October 11	Mississippi College	Berry Field; Birmingham, AL	L 0–7		
October 18	at Bethel (TN)*	McKenzie, TN	W 53–7		
October 24	at Union (TN)*	Rothrock Field; Jackson, TN	W 23–6	800	
October 31	at Millsaps	Mississippi Veterans Memorial Stadium; Jackson, MS	L 7–27		
November 8	at Southwestern (TN)*	Fargason Field; Memphis, TN	W 7–6		
November 15	Carson–Newman*^{†}	Berry Field; Birmingham, AL	W 13–12		
November 22	Jacksonville State*	Hewitt High School Stadium; Trussville, AL (rivalry)	L 0–14		
*Non-conference game; ^{†}Homecoming

== 1953 ==
1953 Howard Bulldogs football
- Conference: Dixie Conference
- Record: 1–8 (0–2 Dixie)
- Head coach: Earl Gartman (5th season)
- Home stadium: Berry Field; Shades Valley H.S. Stadium

The 1953 Howard Bulldogs football team was an American football team that represented Howard College (now known as Samford University) as a member of the Dixie Conference during the 1953 college football season. Led by fifth-year head coach Earl Gartman, the team compiled a 1–8 record. Howard played their home games on campus at Berry Field in Birmingham, Alabama and at Shades Valley High School Stadium in Homewood, Alabama. Gartman resigned as head coach in May 1954, but remained on the staff as an assistant coach.

At the conclusion of the season, several Howard players were named to the All-Dixie Conference Team. Players selected to the first team included Charles Hill at end, Tom Upshaw at guard, and Billy Joe Lovvorn at Back.

Schedule

Date	Opponent	Site	Result	Attendance	Source
September 26	at Sewanee*	Hardee Field; Sewanee, TN	L 0–41	500	
October 3	at Delta State*	Delta Field; Cleveland, MS	L 0–40		
October 10	at Mississippi College	Provine Field; Clinton, MS	L 6–25		
October 16	Millsaps	Shades Valley High School Stadium; Homewood, AL	L 13–16		
October 24	at Florence State*	Coffee Stadium; Florence, AL	L 7–40		
October 31	vs. Troy State*	Municipal Stadium; Andalusia, AL	L 7–31		
November 7	Southwestern (TN)*^{†}	Berry Field; Birmingham, AL	W 34–7		
November 14	at Carson–Newman*	McCown Field; Jefferson City, TN	L 14–20		
November 21	vs. Jacksonville State*	Memorial Stadium; Anniston, AL (rivalry)	L 13–26		
*Non-conference game; ^{†}Homecoming

== 1954 ==
1954 Howard Bulldogs football
- Conference: Dixie Conference
- Record: 2–7 (0–2 Dixie)
- Head coach: William C. White (3rd season)
- Captain: Charles Hill
- Home stadium: Berry Field; Shades Valley H.S. Stadium

The 1954 Howard Bulldogs football team was an American football team that represented Howard College (now known as Samford University) as a member of the Dixie Conference during the 1954 college football season. Led by third-year head coach William C. White, the team compiled a 2–7 record. Howard played their home games on campus at Berry Field in Birmingham, Alabama and at Shades Valley High School Stadium in Homewood, Alabama.

White was hired as head coach in May 1954 from Sewanee where he had served as head coach of the Tigers from 1946 to 1953. This marked the return of White to Howard after he previously served as head coach in 1940 and 1941. White resigned as head coach in January 1955 to be the physical director of the Nashville YMCA.

This marked the final season that Howard competed as a member of the Dixie Conference after its formal disbandment in December 1954. The Bulldogs competed as an independent until their 2003 season when they joined the Ohio Valley Conference.

Schedule

Date	Opponent	Site	Result	Attendance	Source
September 25	at UNAM*	Estadio Universitario; Mexico City, Mexico	L 6–13	10,000	
October 2	Sewanee*	Shades Valley High School Stadium; Homewood, AL	W 20–7	3,000	
October 9	Mississippi College	Berry Field; Birmingham, AL	L 6–13		
October 15	at Millsaps	Mississippi Veterans Memorial Stadium; Jackson, MS	L 12–24		
October 22	at Memphis Navy*	Millington High School Stadium; Millington, TN	W 30–20		
October 30	at Maryville (TN)*	Honaker Field; Maryville, TN	L 12–21		
November 6	at Southwestern (TN)*	Fargason Field; Memphis, TN	L 7–33		
November 13	Carson–Newman*^{†}	Berry Field; Birmingham, AL	L 7–27	1,500	
November 20	Jacksonville State*	Berry Field; Birmingham, AL (rivalry)	L 0–32		
*Non-conference game; ^{†}Homecoming

== 1955 ==
1955 Howard Bulldogs football
- Conference: Independent
- Record: 1–8
- Head coach: Howard Foote (1st season)
- Captains: James Chandler; Wayne Walker
- Home stadium: Berry Field; Legion Field; Shades Valley H.S. Stadium

1955 Southern college football independents records
	Conf.			Overall
Team	W	L	T	W		L		T
Centre		–		8	–	0	–	0
Mississippi Southern		–		9	–	1	–	0
Delaware		–		8	–	1	–	0
Louisville		–		7	–	2	–	0
Tampa		–		7	–	2	–	0
No. 18 Navy		–		6	–	2	–	1
Arkansas State		–		6	–	3	–	0
No. 14 Miami (FL)		–		6	–	3	–	0
Chattanooga		–		5	–	4	–	1
Florida State		–		5	–	5	–	0
Memphis State		–		2	–	7	–	0
Howard (AL)		–		1	–	8	–	0
Sewanee		–		1	–	8	–	0
Rankings from AP Poll

The 1955 Howard Bulldogs football team was an American football team that represented Howard College (now known as the Samford University) as an independent during the 1955 college football season. In their first year under head coach Howard Foote, the team compiled a record of 1–8. Howard played their home games on campus at Berry Field and at Legion Field in Birmingham, Alabama and at Shades Valley High School Stadium in Homewood, Alabama. Seniors James Chandler and Wayne Walker were the team captains.

Foote was hired as head coach of the Bulldogs in July 1955 to serve as the successor for William C. White. Prior to his appointment at Howard, Foote served as head coach at Tarrant High School.

Schedule

Date	Time	Opponent	Site	Result	Attendance	Source
September 24		at Memphis Navy	Millington High School Stadium; Millington, TN	L 7–14		
October 1		at Sewanee	Hardee Field; Sewanee, TN	W 20–14	1,500	
October 8		at Mississippi College	Provine Field; Clinton, MS	L 14–19		
October 14	2:00 p.m.	Millsaps	Berry Field; Birmingham, AL	L 6–33		
October 22	2:00 p.m.	UNAM^{†}	Legion Field; Birmingham, AL	L 13–41	5,000	
October 29	7:30 p.m.	Maryville (TN)	Shades Valley Stadium; Homewood, AL	L 12–21		
November 5		Southwestern (TN)	Berry Field; Birmingham, AL	L 7–25		
November 12		at Carson–Newman	McCown Field; Jefferson City, TN	L 7–47		
November 19		vs. Jacksonville State	Mary Dumas Stadium; Talladega, AL	L 24–67		
^{†}Homecoming; All times are in Central time

== 1956 ==
1956 Howard Bulldogs football
- Conference: Independent
- Record: 2–5–2
- Head coach: Howard Foote (2nd season)
- Home stadium: Berry Field; Shades Valley H.S. Stadium

1956 Southern non-major college football independents records
	Conf.			Overall
Team	W	L	T	W		L		T
Tampa		–		7	–	2	–	0
Mississippi Southern		–		7	–	2	–	1
Louisville		–		6	–	3	–	0
Delaware		–		5	–	3	–	1
Memphis State		–		5	–	4	–	1
Arkansas State		–		5	–	4	–	0
Chattanooga		–		5	–	4	–	0
Howard (AL)		–		2	–	5	–	2
Sewanee		–		1	–	6	–	1

The 1956 Howard Bulldogs football team was an American football team that represented Howard College (now known as the Samford University) as an independent during the 1956 college football season. In their second year under head coach Howard Foote, the team compiled a record of 2–5–2. Howard played their home games on campus at Berry Field in Birmingham, Alabama and at Shades Valley High School Stadium in Homewood, Alabama.

Foote resigned as head coach in August 1957 to become an assistant coach at Austin Peay.

Schedule

Date	Opponent	Site	Result	Attendance	Source
September 22	at Memphis Navy	Millington High School Stadium; Millington, TN	L 0–7		
September 29	Sewanee	Shades Valley High School Stadium; Homewood, AL	T 7–7	1,000	
October 6	vs. Mississippi College	Mary Dumas Stadium; Talladega, AL	L 6–12	3,000	
October 14	at Millsaps	Mississippi Veterans Memorial Stadium; Jackson, MS	T 20–20		
October 20	Carson–Newman^{†}	Berry Field; Birmingham, AL	L 6–25		
October 27	at Maryville (TN)	Honaker Field; Maryville, TN	L 13–20		
November 3	at Southwestern (TN)	Fargason Field; Memphis, TN	W 20–14		
November 10	Tennessee Wesleyan	Berry Field; Birmingham, AL	L 12–19		
November 17	at Livingston State	Tiger Stadium; Livingston, AL	W 24–8		
^{†}Homecoming

== 1957 ==
1957 Howard Bulldogs football
- Conference: Independent
- Record: 4–5
- Head coach: Virgil Ledbetter (1st season)
- Home stadium: Shades Valley H.S. Stadium

1957 Southern non-major college football independents records
	Conf.			Overall
Team	W	L	T	W		L		T
Louisville		–		9	–	1	–	0
Mississippi Southern		–		8	–	3	–	0
Sewanee		–		5	–	2	–	1
Tampa		–		6	–	3	–	0
Abilene Christian		–		5	–	3	–	1
Delaware		–		4	–	3	–	0
Memphis State		–		6	–	4	–	0
Chattanooga		–		4	–	5	–	1
Arkansas State		–		4	–	5	–	0
Howard (AL)		–		4	–	5	–	0
Trinity (TX)		–		3	–	5	–	0
Washington and Lee		–		0	–	8	–	0

The 1957 Howard Bulldogs football team was an American football team that represented Howard College (now known as the Samford University) as an independent during the 1957 college football season. In their first year under head coach Virgil Ledbetter, the team compiled a record of 4–5. Howard played their home games at Shades Valley High School Stadium in Homewood, Alabama.

In August 1957, Ledbetter was promoted to head coach after the departure of Howard Foote to Austin Peay. The 1957 season also was the first for Howard at their new campus in Homewood after previously being based at a campus located in the East Lake neighborhood in Birmingham, Alabama.

Schedule

Date	Opponent	Site	Result	Attendance	Source
September 20	at Memphis Navy	Millington High School Stadium; Millington, TN	L 6–13		
September 28	at Sewanee	Hardee Field; Sewanee, TN	L 0–25	700	
October 5	at Mississippi College	Provine Field; Clinton, MS	L 13–19		
October 11	Millsaps^{†}	Shades Valley High School Stadium; Homewood, AL	W 33–20	2,000	
October 19	at Carson–Newman*	McCown Field; Jefferson City, TN	L 13–72		
October 26	Maryville (TN)	Shades Valley High School Stadium; Homewood, AL	W 20–7	500	
November 2	Southwestern (TN)	Shades Valley High School Stadium; Homewood, AL	W 17–0		
November 9	at Tennessee Wesleyan	Athens, TN	L 14–31		
November 16	vs. Livingston State	Mary Dumas Stadium; Talladega, AL	W 14–6		
*Non-conference game; ^{†}Homecoming

== 1958 ==
1958 Howard Bulldogs football
- Conference: Independent
- Record: 1–6–1
- Head coach: Virgil Ledbetter (2nd season)
- Home stadium: Howard Stadium; Shades Valley H.S. Stadium

1958 Southern non-major college football independents records
	Conf.			Overall
Team	W	L	T	W		L		T
No. 1 Mississippi Southern		–		9	–	0	–	0
Sewanee		–		8	–	0	–	0
Trinity (TX)		–		6	–	3	–	0
Tampa		–		6	–	4	–	0
Abilene Christian		–		5	–	5	–	0
No. 8 Chattanooga		–		5	–	5	–	0
Louisville		–		4	–	4	–	0
Arkansas State		–		4	–	5	–	0
No. 18 Memphis State		–		4	–	5	–	0
Howard (AL)		–		1	–	5	–	1
Washington and Lee		–		1	–	7	–	0
Rankings from UPI small college poll

The 1958 Howard Bulldogs football team was an American football team that represented Howard College (now known as the Samford University) as an independent during the 1958 college football season. In their second year under head coach Virgil Ledbetter, the team compiled a record of 1–6–1. Howard played their home games on campus at Howard Stadium and at Shades Valley High School Stadium in Homewood, Alabama.

In April 1959, Ledbetter was removed from his position as head coach.

Schedule

Date	Opponent	Site	Result	Attendance	Source
September 20	at Memphis Navy	Millington High School Stadium; Millington, TN	L 2–7		
September 26	Sewanee	Howard Stadium; Homewood, AL	L 0–21	2,000	
October 11	Mississippi College	Shades Valley High School Stadium; Homewood, AL	W 26–0		
October 18	at Millsaps	Mississippi Veterans Memorial Stadium; Jackson, MS	L 9–14	1,500	
October 25	Tennessee–Martin^{†}	Howard Stadium; Homewood, AL	T 14–14		
November 1	at Southwestern (TN)	Fargason Field; Memphis, TN	L 12–20		
November 15	vs. Troy State	Municipal Stadium; Andalusia, AL	L 12–33	2,200	
November 22	vs. Tennessee Tech B's	Athens, AL (Cheer Bowl)	L 18–22	3,000	
^{†}Homecoming

== 1959 ==
1959 Howard Bulldogs football

Textile Bowl, W 52–20 vs. Gordon Military College
- Conference: Independent
- Record: 9–1
- Head coach: Bobby Bowden (1st season)
- Home stadium: Howard Stadium

1959 Southern non-major college football independents records
	Conf.			Overall
Team	W	L	T	W		L		T
Howard (AL)		–		9	–	1	–	0
Louisville		–		6	–	4	–	0
Memphis State		–		6	–	4	–	0
Mississippi Southern		–		6	–	4	–	0
Arlington State		–		4	–	3	–	0
Sewanee		–		4	–	3	–	1
Abilene Christian		–		5	–	5	–	0
Washington and Lee		–		3	–	4	–	1
Arkansas State		–		3	–	6	–	0
Trinity (TX)		–		3	–	6	–	0
Chattanooga		–		3	–	7	–	0
Tampa		–		3	–	7	–	0

The 1959 Howard Bulldogs football team was an American football team that represented Howard College (now known as the Samford University) as an independent during the 1959 college football season. In their first year under head coach Bobby Bowden, the team compiled an 9–1 record and defeated Gordon Military College in the Textile Bowl. Howard played their home games on campus at Howard Stadium in Homewood, Alabama.

In May 1959, Bowden was hired as head coach of the Bulldogs.

Schedule

Date	Opponent	Site	Result	Attendance	Source
September 19	at Maryville (TN)	Honaker Field; Maryville, TN	W 14–0	2,500	
September 26	at Sewanee	Hardee Field; Sewanee, TN	W 20–0		
October 3	Tennessee Tech B's	Howard Stadium; Homewood, AL	W 34–0		
October 10	at Mississippi College	Robinson Field; Clinton, MS	L 6–27	6,200	
October 16	Millsaps	Howard Stadium; Homewood, AL	W 26–0		
October 24	at Tennessee–Martin	Union City, TN	W 14–13		
October 31	Southwestern (TN)^{†}	Howard Stadium; Homewood, AL	W 16–0		
November 6	Livingston State	Howard Stadium; Homewood, AL	W 24–0		
November 14	vs. Troy State	Municipal Stadium; Andalusia, AL	W 20–19	2,955	
December 5	vs. Gordon Military College	Valley Stadium; Fairfax, AL (Textile Bowl)	W 52–20	3,500	
^{†}Homecoming
