= 1959 Southwestern Louisiana Bulldogs football team =

American college football season

1959 Southwestern Louisiana Bulldogs football
- Conference: Gulf States Conference
- Record: 4–5 (2–3 GSC)
- Head coach: Red Hoggatt (2nd season)
- Home stadium: McNaspy Stadium

1959 Gulf States Conference football standings
	Conf.					Overall
Team	W		L		T	W		L		T
No. 7 Louisiana Tech $	5	–	0	–	0	9	–	1	–	0
McNeese State	2	–	3	–	0	6	–	3	–	0
Northwestern State	2	–	3	–	0	4	–	5	–	1
Southwestern Louisiana	2	–	3	–	0	4	–	5	–	0
Southeastern Louisiana	1	–	4	–	0	3	–	2	–	0
Northeast Louisiana State	1	–	4	–	0	2	–	8	–	0
$ – Conference champion; Rankings from NAIA poll

The 1959 Southwestern Louisiana Bulldogs football team was an American football team that represented the Southwestern Louisiana Institute of Liberal and Technical Learning (now known as the University of Louisiana at Lafayette) in the Gulf States Conference during the 1959 college football season. In their second year under head coach Red Hoggatt, the team compiled a 4–5 record.

== Schedule ==
Date	Opponent	Site	Result	Attendance	Source
September 18	at Southeastern Louisiana	Strawberry Stadium; Hammond, LA (rivalry)	L 13–18	6,000	
September 25	Sam Houston State*	McNaspy Stadium; Lafayette, LA	W 19–7	5,000	
October 3	Stephen F. Austin*	McNaspy Stadium; Lafayette, LA	W 22–14	3,000	
October 10	at No. T–18 Louisiana Tech	Tech Stadium; Ruston, LA (rivalry)	L 13–21	7,000	
October 24	at Louisiana College*	Alumni Stadium; Pineville, LA	L 6–21	5,000	
October 31	at Northeast Louisiana State	Brown Stadium; Monroe, LA (rivalry)	L 20–34	2,500	
November 7	Abilene Christian*	McNaspy Stadium; Lafayette, LA	L 12–14	5,000	
November 14	Northwestern State	McNaspy Stadium; Lafayette, LA	W 34–14	6,000	
November 21	McNeese State	McNaspy Stadium; Lafayette, LA (rivalry)	W 19–14	4,000–5,000	
*Non-conference game; Rankings from UPI Poll released prior to the game
