= 1959 Chattanooga Moccasins football team =

American college football season

1959 Chattanooga Moccasins football
- Conference: Independent
- Record: 3–7
- Head coach: Scrappy Moore (29th season)
- Captain: Joe Abercrombie
- Home stadium: Chamberlain Field

1959 Southern non-major college football independents records
	Conf.			Overall
Team	W	L	T	W		L		T
Howard (AL)		–		9	–	1	–	0
Louisville		–		6	–	4	–	0
Memphis State		–		6	–	4	–	0
Mississippi Southern		–		6	–	4	–	0
Arlington State		–		4	–	3	–	0
Sewanee		–		4	–	3	–	1
Abilene Christian		–		5	–	5	–	0
Washington and Lee		–		3	–	4	–	1
Arkansas State		–		3	–	6	–	0
Trinity (TX)		–		3	–	6	–	0
Chattanooga		–		3	–	7	–	0
Tampa		–		3	–	7	–	0

The 1959 Chattanooga Moccasins football team was an American football team that represented the University of Chattanooga (now known as the University of Tennessee at Chattanooga) as an independent during the 1959 college football season. In their 29th year under head coach Scrappy Moore, the team compiled a 3–7 record.

== Schedule ==
Date	Opponent	Rank	Site	Result	Attendance	Source
September 18	Jacksonville State		Chamberlain Field; Chattanooga, TN	W 19–0	7,500	
September 25	Abilene Christian	No. T–3	Chamberlain Field; Chattanooga, TN	L 0–3	6,000	
October 2	Furman	No. 7	Chamberlain Field; Chattanooga, TN	W 20–7	5,500	
October 10	at Alabama	No. 6	Denny Stadium; Tuscaloosa, AL	L 0–13	20,000	
October 17	at No. 6 Middle Tennessee	No. 9	Horace Jones Field; Murfreesboro, TN	L 0–28	6,500	
October 24	at Tennessee	No. T–15	Shields–Watkins Field; Knoxville, TN	L 0–23	23,000–25,000	
October 30	Tennessee Tech^{†}	No. 19	Chamberlain Field; Chattanooga, TN	W 6–3	6,000	
November 7	at No. 5 (major) Ole Miss	No. 18	Hemingway Stadium; Oxford, MS	L 0–58	14,500	
November 14	at No. 2 Mississippi Southern		Faulkner Field; Hattiesburg, MS	L 6–16	7,000–7,100	
November 26	No. 7 Memphis State		Chamberlain Field; Chattanooga, TN	L 9–15	7,000–8,000	
^{†}Homecoming; Rankings from UPI Poll released prior to the game
