= 1959 McNeese State Cowboys football team =

American college football season

1959 McNeese State Cowboys football
- Conference: Gulf States Conference
- Record: 6–3 (2–3 GSC)
- Head coach: Les DeVall (3rd season)
- Home stadium: Wildcat Stadium

1959 Gulf States Conference football standings
	Conf.					Overall
Team	W		L		T	W		L		T
No. 7 Louisiana Tech $	5	–	0	–	0	9	–	1	–	0
McNeese State	2	–	3	–	0	6	–	3	–	0
Northwestern State	2	–	3	–	0	4	–	5	–	1
Southwestern Louisiana	2	–	3	–	0	4	–	5	–	0
Southeastern Louisiana	1	–	4	–	0	3	–	2	–	0
Northeast Louisiana State	1	–	4	–	0	2	–	8	–	0
$ – Conference champion; Rankings from NAIA poll

The 1959 McNeese State Cowboys football team was an American football team that represented McNeese State College (now known as McNeese State University) as a member of the Gulf States Conference (GSC) during the 1959 college football season. In their third year under head coach Les DeVall, the team compiled an overall record of 6–3 with a mark of 2–3 in conference play, tying for second place in the GSC.

== Schedule ==
Date	Opponent	Site	Result	Attendance	Source
September 19	at Northwestern State	Demon Stadium; Natchitoches, LA (rivalry)	L 6–19	5,000	
September 26	at Stephen F. Austin*	Memorial Stadium; Nacogdoches, TX	W 20–7	3,500	
October 3	Louisiana Tech	Wildcat Stadium; Lake Charles, LA	L 0–28	5,000	
October 10	Tampa*	Wildcat Stadium; Lake Charles, LA	W 27–14	4,500	
October 17	at Northeast Louisiana State	Brown Stadium; Monroe, LA	W 21–6	3,500	
October 31	at Louisiana College*	Alumni Field; Pineville, LA	W 26–0	3,900	
November 7	Florence State*	Wildcat Stadium; Lake Charles, LA	W 28–7	4,000	
November 14	Southeastern Louisiana	Wildcat Stadium; Lake Charles, LA	W 20–8	1,500	
November 21	at Southwestern Louisiana	McNaspy Stadium; Lafayette, LA (rivalry)	L 14–19	4,000–5,000	
*Non-conference game
