= Red Hoggatt =

American football player and coach (1930–2017)

Biographical details
- Born: June 9, 1930; Bogalusa, Louisiana, U.S.
- Died: April 25, 2017 (aged 86); Hattiesburg, Mississippi, U.S.

Playing career
- 1949–1950: Tennessee Wesleyan
- 1951–1952: Memphis State

Coaching career (HC unless noted)
- 1958–1960: Southwestern Louisiana
- 1961–1972: Memphis (assistant)
- 1973–1974: Southern Miss (assistant)

Head coaching record
- Overall: 11–17

Buford James "Red" Hoggatt (June 9, 1930 – April 25, 2017) was an American college football player and coach. He served as the head football coach at Southwestern Louisiana Institute of Liberal and Technical Learning—now known as the University of Louisiana–Lafayette—from 1958 to 1960, compiling a record of 11–17.

== Head coaching record ==
Year	Team	Overall	Conference	Standing	Bowl/playoffs
Southwestern Louisiana Bulldogs (Gulf States Conference) (1958–1960)
1958	Southwestern Louisiana	1–8	0–5	6th	
1959	Southwestern Louisiana	4–5	2–3	T–4th	
1960	Southwestern Louisiana	6–4	3–2	T–3rd	
Southwestern Louisiana:		11–17	5–10		
Total:		11–17			
