= 1958 Sam Houston State Bearkats football team =

American college football season

1958 Sam Houston State Bearkats football

Christmas Festival Bowl, L 11–18 vs. Northwestern State
- Conference: Lone Star Conference
- Record: 7–3 (5–2 LSC)
- Head coach: Paul Pierce (7th season)
- Home stadium: Pritchett Field

1958 Lone Star Conference football standings
| | Conf. | | | | | Overall |
| Team | W | | L | | T | W | | L | | T |
|---|---|---|---|---|---|---|---|---|---|---|
| No. 5 East Texas State $ | 6 | – | 1 | – | 0 | 10 | – | 1 | – | 0 |
| Lamar Tech | 5 | – | 2 | – | 0 | 6 | – | 2 | – | 0 |
| Sam Houston State | 5 | – | 2 | – | 0 | 7 | – | 2 | – | 0 |
| Texas A&I | 4 | – | 3 | – | 0 | 7 | – | 4 | – | 0 |
| Southwest Texas State | 4 | – | 3 | – | 0 | 5 | – | 5 | – | 0 |
| Howard Payne | 2 | – | 5 | – | 0 | 2 | – | 7 | – | 0 |
| Stephen F. Austin | 1 | – | 6 | – | 0 | 2 | – | 7 | – | 0 |
| Sul Ross | 1 | – | 6 | – | 0 | 2 | – | 8 | – | 0 |
$ – Conference champion; Rankings from UPI small college poll

The 1958 Sam Houston State Bearkats football team represented Sam Houston State Teachers College (now known as Sam Houston State University) as a member of the Lone Star Conference (LSC) during the 1958 college football season. Led by seventh-year head coach Paul Pierce, the Bearkats compiled an overall record of 7–3 with a mark of 5–2 in conference play, and finished tied for second in the LSC.

== Schedule ==
| Date | Opponent | Site | Result | Attendance | Source |
|---|---|---|---|---|---|
| September 20 | at McNeese State* | Lake Charles, LA | W 12–6 | | |
| September 27 | Southwestern Louisiana* | Pritchett Field; Huntsville, TX | W 6–0 | | |
| October 4 | at Sul Ross | Jackson Field; Alpine, TX | W 21–8 | | |
| October 11 | Texas A&I | Pritchett Field; Huntsville, TX | W 21–20 | 4,500 | |
| October 18 | at Lamar Tech | Greenie Stadium; Beaumont, TX | L 7–20 | | |
| October 25 | at No. 11 East Texas State | Memorial Stadium; Commerce, TX | L 0–52 | 8,000 | |
| November 3 | at Howard Payne | Lion Field; Brownwood, TX | W 26–6 | | |
| November 8 | Southwest Texas State | Pritchett Field; Huntsville, TX | W 9–0 | | |
| November 15 | Stephen F. Austin | Pritchett Field; Huntsville, TX (rivalry) | W 21–12 | | |
| December 6 | vs. Northwestern State* | Demon Stadium; Natchitoches, LA (Christmas Festival Bowl) | L 11–18 | 6,000 | |
*Non-conference game; Rankings from UPI Poll released prior to the game
