= 1959 Louisville Cardinals football team =

American college football season

1959 Louisville Cardinals football
- Conference: Independent
- Record: 6–4
- Head coach: Frank Camp (14th season)
- Home stadium: Fairgrounds Stadium

1959 Southern non-major college football independents records
	Conf.			Overall
Team	W	L	T	W		L		T
Howard (AL)		–		9	–	1	–	0
Louisville		–		6	–	4	–	0
Memphis State		–		6	–	4	–	0
Mississippi Southern		–		6	–	4	–	0
Arlington State		–		4	–	3	–	0
Sewanee		–		4	–	3	–	1
Abilene Christian		–		5	–	5	–	0
Washington and Lee		–		3	–	4	–	1
Arkansas State		–		3	–	6	–	0
Trinity (TX)		–		3	–	6	–	0
Chattanooga		–		3	–	7	–	0
Tampa		–		3	–	7	–	0

The 1959 Louisville Cardinals football team was an American football team that represented the University of Louisville as an independent during the 1959 college football season. In their 14th season under head coach Frank Camp, the Cardinals compiled a 6–4 record.

The team's statistical leaders included Ernie Green with 510 rushing yards.

== Schedule ==
Date	Opponent	Site	Result	Attendance	Source
September 15	Western Kentucky	Fairgrounds Stadium; Louisville, KY	W 19–0	3,519	
September 19	at Xavier	Xavier Stadium; Cincinnati, OH	L 13–28	8,000	
September 25	at Eastern Kentucky	Richmond, KY	W 14–7	3,000	
October 3	at Bradley	Peoria, IL	W 28–8	1,000	
October 10	at Murray State	Murray, KY	W 28–0	4,000	
October 17	Dayton	Fairgrounds Stadium; Louisville, KY	W 32–6	4,972	
October 31	Marshall	Fairgrounds Stadium; Louisville, KY	W 48–6	2,592	
November 7	at No. 20 (major) North Texas State	Fouts Field; Denton, TX	L 7–39	5,000	
November 14	No. 12 Ohio	Fairgrounds Stadium; Louisville, KY	L 15–22	4,500	
November 21	at Kent State	Memorial Stadium; Kent, OH	L 14–16		
Rankings from UPI Poll released prior to the game
