= 1958 Southwest Texas State Bobcats football team =

American college football season

1958 Southwest Texas State Bobcats football
- Conference: Lone Star Conference
- Record: 5–5 (4–3 LSC)
- Head coach: R. W. Parker (5th season)
- Home stadium: Evans Field

1958 Lone Star Conference football standings
| | Conf. | | | | | Overall |
| Team | W | | L | | T | W | | L | | T |
|---|---|---|---|---|---|---|---|---|---|---|
| No. 5 East Texas State $ | 6 | – | 1 | – | 0 | 10 | – | 1 | – | 0 |
| Lamar Tech | 5 | – | 2 | – | 0 | 6 | – | 2 | – | 0 |
| Sam Houston State | 5 | – | 2 | – | 0 | 7 | – | 2 | – | 0 |
| Texas A&I | 4 | – | 3 | – | 0 | 7 | – | 4 | – | 0 |
| Southwest Texas State | 4 | – | 3 | – | 0 | 5 | – | 5 | – | 0 |
| Howard Payne | 2 | – | 5 | – | 0 | 2 | – | 7 | – | 0 |
| Stephen F. Austin | 1 | – | 6 | – | 0 | 2 | – | 7 | – | 0 |
| Sul Ross | 1 | – | 6 | – | 0 | 2 | – | 8 | – | 0 |
$ – Conference champion; Rankings from UPI small college poll

The 1958 Southwest Texas State Bobcats football team was an American football team that represented Southwest Texas State Teachers College (now known as Texas State University) during the 1958 college football season as a member of the Lone Star Conference (LSC). In their fifth year under head coach R. W. Parker, the team compiled an overall record of 5–5 with a mark of 4–3 in conference play.

== Schedule ==
| Date | Opponent | Site | Result | Source |
|---|---|---|---|---|
| September 13 | McNeese State* | Evans Field; San Marcos, TX | L 0–21 | |
| September 22 | Texas Lutheran* | Evans Field; San Marcos, TX | W 27–0 | |
| September 27 | at Howard Payne | Lion Stadium; Brownwood, TX | W 12–7 | |
| October 4 | at Texas A&I | Javelina Stadium; Kingsville, TX | L 0–22 | |
| October 12 | Sul Ross | Evans Field; San Marcos, TX | W 20–0 | |
| October 18 | Stephen F. Austin | Evans Field; San Marcos, TX | W 29–13 | |
| October 25 | Abilene Christian* | Evans Field; San Marcos, TX | L 18–44 | |
| November 1 | Lamar Tech | Evans Field; San Marcos, TX | W 8–7 | |
| November 8 | at Sam Houston State | Pritchett Field; Huntsville, TX (rivalry) | L 0–9 | |
| November 15 | at East Texas State | Memorial Stadium; Commerce, TX | L 0–47 | |
*Non-conference game
