= 1959 Southwest Texas State Bobcats football team =

American college football season

1959 Southwest Texas State Bobcats football
- Conference: Lone Star Conference
- Record: 4–6 (2–5 LSC)
- Head coach: R. W. Parker (6th season)
- Home stadium: Evans Field

1959 Lone Star Conference football standings
| | Conf. | | | | | Overall |
| Team | W | | L | | T | W | | L | | T |
|---|---|---|---|---|---|---|---|---|---|---|
| No. 5 Texas A&I +^ | 6 | – | 1 | – | 0 | 12 | – | 1 | – | 0 |
| No. 4 East Texas State + | 6 | – | 1 | – | 0 | 9 | – | 1 | – | 0 |
| Lamar Tech | 4 | – | 3 | – | 0 | 8 | – | 3 | – | 0 |
| Stephen F. Austin | 4 | – | 3 | – | 0 | 4 | – | 6 | – | 1 |
| Sam Houston State | 3 | – | 4 | – | 0 | 5 | – | 5 | – | 0 |
| Howard Payne | 3 | – | 4 | – | 0 | 3 | – | 7 | – | 0 |
| Southwest Texas State | 2 | – | 5 | – | 0 | 4 | – | 6 | – | 0 |
| Sul Ross | 0 | – | 7 | – | 0 | 0 | – | 9 | – | 0 |
+ – Conference co-champions; ^ – NAIA playoff participant; Rankings from NAIA poll

The 1959 Southwest Texas State Bobcats football team was an American football team that represented Southwest Texas State Teachers College (now known as Texas State University) during the 1959 college football season as a member of the Lone Star Conference (LSC). In their sixth year under head coach R. W. Parker, the team compiled an overall record of 4–6 with a mark of 2–5 in conference play.

== Schedule ==
| Date | Opponent | Site | Result | Attendance | Source |
|---|---|---|---|---|---|
| September 19 | at Texas Lutheran* | Matador Field; Seguin, TX | W 14–12 | | |
| September 26 | Corpus Christi* | Evans Field; San Marcos, TX | W 36–6 | | |
| October 3 | at Sul Ross | Jackson Field; Alpine, TX | W 13–8 | | |
| October 10 | McMurry* | Evans Field; San Marcos, TX | L 7–20 | | |
| October 17 | at Stephen F. Austin | Memorial Stadium; Nacogdoches, TX | L 6–14 | | |
| October 24 | No. T–11 Lamar Tech | Evans Field; San Marcos, TX | L 6–28 | | |
| October 31 | Sam Houston State | Evans Field; San Marcos, TX (rivalry) | W 18–14 | 5,000 | |
| November 7 | at No. 6 East Texas State | Memorial Stadium; Commerce, TX | L 15–28 | | |
| November 14 | Howard Payne | Evans Field; San Marcos, TX | L 0–6 | | |
| November 21 | at Texas A&I | Javelina Stadium; Kingsville, TX | L 0–20 | | |
*Non-conference game; Rankings from UPI Poll released prior to the game
