= 1958 Southwestern Louisiana Bulldogs football team =

American college football season

1958 Southwestern Louisiana Bulldogs football
- Conference: Gulf States Conference
- Record: 1–8 (0–5 GSC)
- Head coach: Red Hoggatt (1st season)
- Home stadium: McNaspy Stadium

1958 Gulf States Conference football standings
	Conf.					Overall
Team	W		L		T	W		L		T
Northwestern State +	4	–	1	–	0	8	–	2	–	0
Louisiana Tech +	4	–	1	–	0	7	–	3	–	0
Northeast Louisiana State	3	–	2	–	0	6	–	3	–	0
McNeese State	2	–	3	–	0	5	–	5	–	0
Southeastern Louisiana	2	–	3	–	0	4	–	5	–	0
Southwestern Louisiana	0	–	5	–	0	1	–	8	–	0
+ – Conference co-champions

The 1958 Southwestern Louisiana Bulldogs football team was an American football team that represented the Southwestern Louisiana Institute of Liberal and Technical Learning (now known as the University of Louisiana at Lafayette) in the Gulf States Conference during the 1958 college football season. In their first year under head coach Red Hoggatt, the team compiled a 1–8 record.

== Schedule ==
Date	Opponent	Site	Result	Attendance	Source
September 20	Southeastern Louisiana	McNaspy Stadium; Lafayette, LA (rivalry)	L 6–14	5,200	
September 27	at Sam Houston State*	Pritchett Field; Huntsville, TX	L 0–6		
October 4	Northeast Louisiana State	McNaspy Stadium; Lafayette, LA (rivalry)	L 8–29	2,800–3,400	
October 11	Louisiana Tech^{†}	McNaspy Stadium; Lafayette, LA (rivalry)	L 0–33	4,500	
October 18	at Abilene Christian*	Fair Park; Abilene, TX	L 8–27		
October 25	Trinity (TX)*	McNaspy Stadium; Lafayette, LA	W 22–18		
November 1	at Southern State (AR)*	Wilkins Stadium; Magnolia, AR	L 7–13		
November 8	at Northwestern State	Demon Stadium; Natchitoches, LA	L 8–27	6,000	
November 22	at McNeese State	Wildcat Stadium; Lake Charles, LA (rivalry)	L 8–9		
*Non-conference game; ^{†}Homecoming
