= 1958 Northeast Louisiana State Indians football team =

American college football season

1958 Northeast Louisiana State Indians football
- Conference: Gulf States Conference
- Record: 6–3 (3–2 GSC)
- Head coach: Jack C. Rowan (1st season)
- Home stadium: Brown Stadium

1958 Gulf States Conference football standings
	Conf.					Overall
Team	W		L		T	W		L		T
Northwestern State +	4	–	1	–	0	8	–	2	–	0
Louisiana Tech +	4	–	1	–	0	7	–	3	–	0
Northeast Louisiana State	3	–	2	–	0	6	–	3	–	0
McNeese State	2	–	3	–	0	5	–	5	–	0
Southeastern Louisiana	2	–	3	–	0	4	–	5	–	0
Southwestern Louisiana	0	–	5	–	0	1	–	8	–	0
+ – Conference co-champions

The 1958 Northeast Louisiana State Indians football team was an American football team that represented Northeast Louisiana State College (now known as the University of Louisiana at Monroe) in the Gulf States Conference during the 1958 college football season. In their first year under head coach Jack C. Rowan, the team compiled a 6–3 record.

== Schedule ==
Date	Opponent	Site	Result	Attendance	Source
September 13	at Southern State (AR)*	Wilkins Stadium; Magnolia, AR	W 33–12	3,000	
September 20	Stephen F. Austin*	Brown Stadium; Monroe, LA	W 14–12	5,000	
September 27	at Delta State*	Delta Field; Cleveland, MS	W 23–0	4,700	
October 4	at Southwestern Louisiana	McNaspy Stadium; Lafayette, LA (rivalry)	W 29–8	2,800–3,400	
October 18	at McNeese State	Wildcat Stadium; Lake Charles, LA	W 29–14	4,000	
October 25	at Southeastern Louisiana	Strawberry Stadium; Hammond, LA	W 22–8	2,100	
November 1	Northwestern State	Brown Stadium; Monroe, LA (rivalry)	L 6–42	7,000	
November 15	at Louisiana College*	Alumni Stadium; Pineville, LA	L 12–21	4,500	
November 22	Louisiana Tech	Brown Stadium; Monroe, LA (rivalry)	L 21–46	6,000–7,000	
*Non-conference game
