= 1958 Lamar Tech Cardinals football team =

American college football season

1958 Lamar Tech Cardinals football
- Conference: Lone Star Conference
- Record: 6–2 (5–2 LSC)
- Head coach: James B. Higgins (6th season)
- Home stadium: Greenie Stadium

1958 Lone Star Conference football standings
	Conf.					Overall
Team	W		L		T	W		L		T
No. 5 East Texas State $	6	–	1	–	0	10	–	1	–	0
Lamar Tech	5	–	2	–	0	6	–	2	–	0
Sam Houston State	5	–	2	–	0	7	–	2	–	0
Texas A&I	4	–	3	–	0	7	–	4	–	0
Southwest Texas State	4	–	3	–	0	5	–	5	–	0
Howard Payne	2	–	5	–	0	2	–	7	–	0
Stephen F. Austin	1	–	6	–	0	2	–	7	–	0
Sul Ross	1	–	6	–	0	2	–	8	–	0
$ – Conference champion; Rankings from UPI small college poll

The 1958 Lamar Tech Cardinals football team was an American football team that represented Lamar State College of Technology—now known Lamar University–as a member of the Lone Star Conference (LSC) during the 1958 college football season. Led by sixth-year head coach James B. Higgins, the Cardinals compiled an overall record of 6–2 with a mark of 5–2 in conference play, tying for second place in the LSC.

== Schedule ==
Date	Opponent	Rank	Site	Result	Attendance	Source
September 27	Corpus Christi*		Greenie Stadium; Beaumont, TX	W 26–0		
October 4	at Stephen F. Austin		Memorial Stadium; Nacogdoches, TX	W 35–6		
October 11	No. 2 East Texas State		Greenie Stadium; Beaumont, TX	W 21–0		
October 18	Sam Houston State		Greenie Stadium; Beaumont, TX	W 20–7		
October 25	at Howard Payne	No. 17	Lion Stadium; Brownwood, TX	L 19–24	4,000	
November 1	at Southwest Texas State		Evans Field; San Marcos, TX	L 7–8		
November 8	Texas A&I		Greenie Stadium; Beaumont, TX	W 14–0	7,500	
November 15	at Sul Ross		Jackson Field; Alpine, TX	W 46–6		
*Non-conference game; Rankings from UPI Poll released prior to the game
