= William C. White (American football) =

American football coach and administrator (1896–1986)

Biographical details
- Born: July 21, 1896; Howell, Tennessee, U.S.
- Died: June 10, 1986 (aged 89); Franklin, Tennessee, U.S.

Playing career
- 1921: Tennessee

Coaching career (HC unless noted)
- 1930–1940: Ramsay HS (AL)
- 1940–1941: Howard (AL)
- 1945: Tennessee (assistant)
- 1946–1953: Sewanee
- 1954: Howard (AL)

Administrative career (AD unless noted)
- ?–1942: Howard (AL)
- 1953: Sewanee

Head coaching record
- Overall: 48–40–4 (college)

William Cannon White (July 21, 1896 – June 10, 1986) was an American football coach and college athletics administrator. He served as the head football coach at Ramsay High School in Birmingham, Alabama from 1930 to 1940, at Howard College in Homewood, Alabama from 1940 to 1941 and again in 1954 and at Sewanee: The University of the South from 1946 to 1953. White also played football for the Tennessee Volunteers in 1921.

== Coaching career ==
Following his graduation from Tennessee in 1922, White coached at Trousdale County High School in Tennessee and then at Ramsay High School in Birmingham, Alabama from 1930 to 1940. In January 1940, he was hired at Howard College (now Samford University) to serve as head football coach. During his two-year stint at Howard from 1940 through the 1941 seasons, White compiled a record of 8 wins, 10 losses and one tie (8–10–1). Following the 1941 season, Howard temporarily dropped the football program due to the onset of World War II. It was at this time White enlisted to serve in the Army and was commissioned as a captain in the United States Army Air Forces.

Following the war, White resumed his coaching career as a line coach at Tennessee for the 1945 season. The following year, he was hired at Sewanee to serve as head coach. During his time there from 1946 to 1953, White compiled a record of 38 wins, 23 losses and three ties (38–23–3). After resigning from his post in February 1954, White returned to Howard where he coached for only the 1954 season and compiled a record of 2 wins and 7 losses (2–7).

== Head coaching record ==
=== College ===
Year	Team	Overall	Conference	Standing	Bowl/playoffs
Howard Bulldogs (Dixie Conference) (1940–1941)
1940	Howard	4–5	4–1	2nd	
1941	Howard	4–5–1	2–0–1	2nd	
Sewanee Tigers (Independent) (1946–1953)
1946	Sewanee	4–3			
1947	Sewanee	6–1–1			
1948	Sewanee	6–1–1			
1949	Sewanee	4–2–1			
1950	Sewanee	3–6			
1951	Sewanee	5–3			
1952	Sewanee	7–2			
1953	Sewanee	3–5			
Sewanee:		38–23–3			
Howard Bulldogs (Independent) (1954)
1954	Howard	2–7			
Howard:		10–17–1	6–1–1		
Total:		48–40–4			
