= 1958 McNeese State Cowboys football team =

American college football season

1958 McNeese State Cowboys football
- Conference: Gulf States Conference
- Record: 5–5 (2–3 GSC)
- Head coach: Les DeVall (2nd season)
- Home stadium: Wildcat Stadium

1958 Gulf States Conference football standings
	Conf.					Overall
Team	W		L		T	W		L		T
Northwestern State +	4	–	1	–	0	8	–	2	–	0
Louisiana Tech +	4	–	1	–	0	7	–	3	–	0
Northeast Louisiana State	3	–	2	–	0	6	–	3	–	0
McNeese State	2	–	3	–	0	5	–	5	–	0
Southeastern Louisiana	2	–	3	–	0	4	–	5	–	0
Southwestern Louisiana	0	–	5	–	0	1	–	8	–	0
+ – Conference co-champions

The 1958 McNeese State Cowboys football team was an American football team that represented McNeese State College (now known as McNeese State University) as a member of the Gulf States Conference (GSC) during the 1958 college football season. In their second year under head coach Les DeVall, the team compiled an overall record of 5–5 with a mark of 2–3 in conference play, tying for fourth place in the GSC.

== Schedule ==
Date	Opponent	Site	Result	Attendance	Source
September 13	at Southwest Texas State*	Evans Field; San Marcos, TX	W 21–0		
September 20	Sam Houston State*	Wildcat Stadium; Lake Charles, LA	L 6–12		
September 27	Northwestern State	Wildcat Stadium; Lake Charles, LA (rivalry)	W 25–8	3,000	
October 4	at Louisiana Tech	Tech Stadium; Ruston, LA	L 0–17		
October 11	Louisiana College*	Wildcat Stadium; Lake Charles, LA	W 7–0		
October 18	Northeast Louisiana State	Wildcat Stadium; Lake Charles, LA	L 14–29		
October 27	at McMurry*	Indian Stadium; Abilene, TX	L 0–21		
November 8	at Florence State*	Municipal Stadium; Florence, AL	W 20–0		
November 15	at Southeastern Louisiana	Strawberry Stadium; Hammond, LA	L 6–7		
November 22	Southwestern Louisiana	Wildcat Stadium; Lake Charles, LA (rivalry)	W 9–8		
*Non-conference game
