= 1959 Arkansas State Indians football team =

American college football season

1959 Arkansas State Indians football
- Conference: Independent
- Record: 3–6
- Head coach: Hugh Taylor (2nd season)
- Home stadium: Kays Stadium

1959 Southern non-major college football independents records
| | Conf. | | | Overall |
| Team | W | L | T | W | | L | | T |
|---|---|---|---|---|---|---|---|---|
| Howard (AL) | | – | | 9 | – | 1 | – | 0 |
| Louisville | | – | | 6 | – | 4 | – | 0 |
| Memphis State | | – | | 6 | – | 4 | – | 0 |
| Mississippi Southern | | – | | 6 | – | 4 | – | 0 |
| Arlington State | | – | | 4 | – | 3 | – | 0 |
| Sewanee | | – | | 4 | – | 3 | – | 1 |
| Abilene Christian | | – | | 5 | – | 5 | – | 0 |
| Washington and Lee | | – | | 3 | – | 4 | – | 1 |
| Arkansas State | | – | | 3 | – | 6 | – | 0 |
| Trinity (TX) | | – | | 3 | – | 6 | – | 0 |
| Chattanooga | | – | | 3 | – | 7 | – | 0 |
| Tampa | | – | | 3 | – | 7 | – | 0 |

The 1959 Arkansas State Indians football team represented Arkansas State College—now known as Arkansas State University—as an independent during the 1959 college football season. Led by second-year head coach Hugh Taylor, the Indians compiled a record of 3–6.

== Schedule ==
| Date | Opponent | Site | Result | Attendance | Source |
|---|---|---|---|---|---|
| September 19 | Northeast Louisiana State | Kays Stadium; Jonesboro, AR | W 15–0 | 4,500 | |
| September 26 | at Louisiana Tech | Tech Stadium; Ruston, LA | L 0–35 | 7,000 | |
| October 3 | Florence State | Kays Stadium; Jonesboro, AR | L 14–16 | | |
| October 10 | at Mississippi State | Scott Field; Starkville, MS | L 14–49 | 13,000 | |
| October 24 | No. 17 Western Illinois | Kays Stadium; Jonesboro, AR | L 19–22 | | |
| October 31 | Murray State | Kays Stadium; Jonesboro, AR | W 36–18 | 5,000 | |
| November 7 | at Tampa | Phillips Field; Tampa, FL | L 13–14 | 3,500–6,000 | |
| November 14 | at Tennessee Tech | Overall Field; Cookeville, TN | L 6–16 | | |
| November 21 | Central Missouri State | Kays Stadium; Jonesboro, AR | W 54–6 | | |
Rankings from UPI Poll released prior to the game
