= Butch Pressley =

American gridiron football player (born 1941)

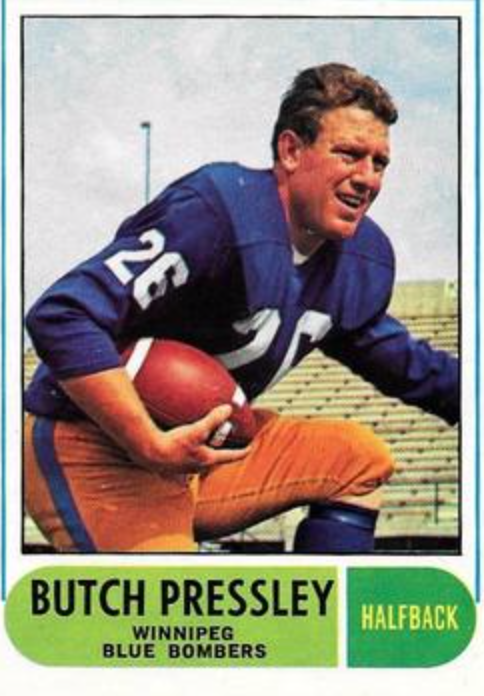
- 1968 trading card of Butch Pressley

Profile
- Position: Running back

Personal information
- Born: March 22, 1941 (age 85); Taft, Texas, U.S.
- Listed height: 5 ft 11 in (1.80 m)
- Listed weight: 207 lb (94 kg)

Career information
- College: Texas A&M–Kingsville

Career history
- 1964–1966: Edmonton Eskimos
- 1967–1969: Winnipeg Blue Bombers

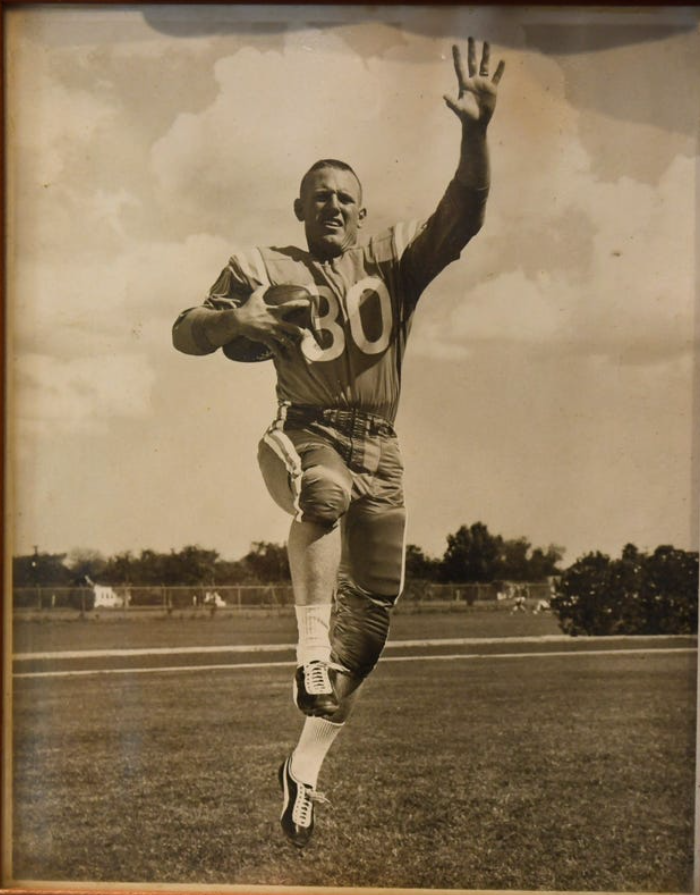
Butch Pressley while attending Texas A&M-Kingsville

William Neel Pressley (born March 22, 1941), known professionally as Butch Pressley, is an American former professional football player who played for the Edmonton Eskimos and Winnipeg Blue Bombers. He played college football at the Texas A&I University–Kingsville and was inducted into the Javelina Hall of Fame in 1977. Pressley was the former president and co-owner of Timco Services.

== Early life and career ==
Pressley was born in Taft, Texas, the son of Mary Catherine "Kak" (née Clark) and Neel Erskin "Red" Pressley. Pressley had two younger brothers, George and Lowry. Pressley's father was a Staff Sergeant in the U.S. Army and served as a medic in the Philippines during World War II. Pressley attended Taft High School from 1955-1959, where he was a local football star and lettered in football, baseball, and track.

=== 1959-1963: College football ===
Pressley went on to play college football at the Texas A&I University-Kingsville and was recruited to the starting team his freshman season. During his time at Kingsville, Pressley was All-Texas College in 1959, 1960, and 1962 and was on the All-Lone Star Conference in 1960 and 1962. After being voted the most valuable back as a freshman in the 1959 NAIA national championship game, Pressley and the A&I team won the 1960 Great Southwest Bowl title. Pressley led the team in rushing in 1959, in scoring in 1959 and 1962, and was named to the LSC team of the decade for the 1960s. Pressley later played in the 1963 Challenge Bowl all-star game, and was inducted into the Javelina Hall of Fame in 1977.

=== 1964-1969: Canadian football ===
After graduating from Texas A&I University-Kingsville with a degree in general engineering, Pressley played in Canada three seasons for the Edmonton Eskimos from 1964-1966. In 1967, Pressley went on to play three more seasons for the Winnipeg Blue Bombers until 1969. In total, Pressley ran for 2,277 yards in his Canadian career on 466 attempts, and scored 16 rushing touchdowns. Pressley caught 67 passes for 767 yards and 3 receiving touchdowns. Pressley retired after 1969.

== Post-football career ==
After his retirement from professional football, in 1970 Pressley worked as the Offshore Drilling Superintendent of Tenneco for operations in the Gulf of Mexico, and frequently relocated between the cities of Houston, Corpus Christi, and Lafayette, Louisiana. In 1980, Pressley served as the Vice President of Marlin Drilling in Houston. In 1981, Pressley left and joined Timco Services in Lafayette, an oil field service company that dealt with casing crews and rental tools. Pressley was immediately hired as president and eventually became a co-owner. After 30 years, Pressley officially sold his shares in 2011. In 1992, Pressley purchased La Puerta, a ranch in Agua Dulce, Texas and former property of the King Ranch. La Puerta Ranch was originally gifted to Richard King II by his parents as a wedding present in 1883. Pressley and his sons founded La Puerta Ranch Outfitters, a business specializing in hunting leases, guided hunts, cattle breeding, and white-tailed trophy breeding. The company operated until the property was sold in 2017.

== Personal life ==
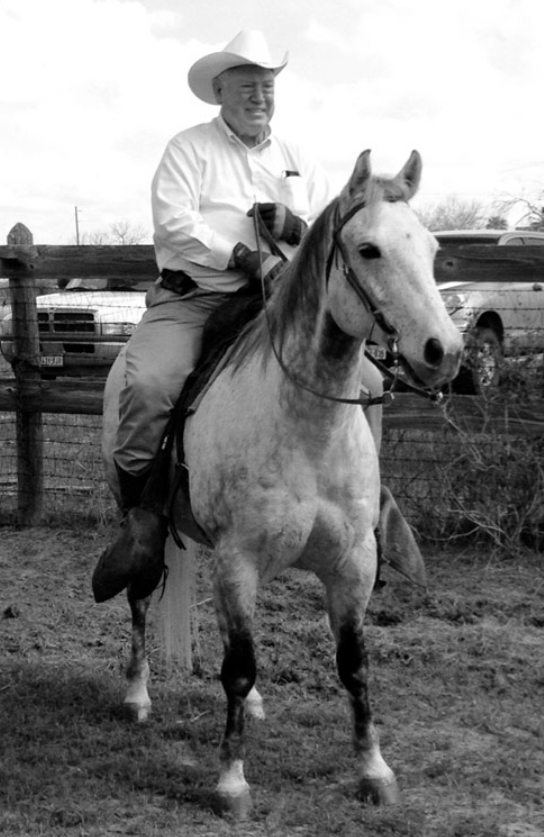
Butch Pressley at La Puerta Ranch, Agua Dulce, Texas

Pressley has been married to Judith Sue "Judy" Pressley (née Harris) since 1964. She is a George West native and a distant descendant of three defenders of the Battle of the Alamo and a direct descendant of the Taylor family of the Sutton-Taylor feud. The couple have two sons, James (b. November 1966) and William (b. November 1969). Pressley is an active member of the ROMEO club for retired athletes, and has since resided in Corpus Christi, Texas.
