= Xavier Beitia =

American football player (born 1982)

No. 3
- Position: Placekicker

Personal information
- Born: November 23, 1982 (age 43); Tampa, Florida, U.S.
- Listed height: 5 ft 10 in (1.78 m)
- Listed weight: 198 lb (90 kg)

Career information
- High school: Jesuit (Tampa)
- College: Florida State (2001–2004)
- NFL draft: 2005: undrafted

Career history
- New York Jets (2005)*; Tampa Bay Buccaneers (2006)*; → Berlin Thunder (2006); Georgia Force (2007)
- * Offseason or practice squad member only
- Stats at ArenaFan.com

Xavier Beitia (born November 23, 1982) is an American former football placekicker. He played college football at Florida State and signed with the New York Jets in 2004 and Tampa Bay Buccaneers in 2006. Within NFL Europe, he played for the Berlin Thunder. He also played for the Georgia Force of the Arena Football League (AFL) in 2007.

== Early life ==
Beitia attended Jesuit High School of Tampa in Tampa, Florida and kicked for coach Dominic Ciao. While in high school, he participated in the first ever U.S. Army All-American Bowl game in 2000.

== College career ==
At Florida State, Beitia was well known for having missed a potential game-winning field goal against Miami (Fla.). The kick went wide left as time expired in 2002, in what would continue the bizarre "Wide Right" saga. Beitia's miss at the Miami Orange Bowl was dubbed "Wide Left I," and it affected him openly and deeply.

More than one year later, Beitia missed another field goal in the 2004 Orange Bowl which would have given the Noles the lead with about five minutes left. This would be known as "Wide Right IV". The Miami Hurricanes went on to win that game, 16–14.

== Professional career ==
In 2004, he signed with the New York Jets. In 2006, Xavier became a member of the Tampa Bay Buccaneers being used as a punter, but not for field goals. Tampa Bay sent him to NFL Europe that year, where he played for the Berlin Thunder. He was released by Tampa Bay in August 2006. Beitia went on to become a kicker for in the AFL for the Georgia Force, before being waived in May 2007.

== Personal life ==
In 2012 Xavier started training CrossFit at Hallandale Beach CrossFit and subsequently met the woman who would become his future wife (Talisha Mora) at the box. They were engaged on July 28, 2015, and Wed on May 21, 2016. Talisha has a daughter (Alyssa Mora).
