= Earl Gartman =

American sports coach and college athletics administrator

Biographical details
- Born: June 23, 1920; Gadsden, Alabama, U.S.
- Died: March 8, 1995 (aged 74); Apopka, Florida, U.S.
- Education: Howard College (AL)

Coaching career (HC unless noted)

Football
- 1949–1953: Howard (AL)
- 1955–1957: Austin Peay (backfield)
- 1958–1959: Austin Peay
- 1963–1965: Los Fresnos HS (TX)
- 1966: Trinity (TX) (backfield)
- 1967–1969: Trinity (TX)

Basketball
- 1950–1955: Howard (AL)

Baseball
- 1952–1955: Howard (AL)
- 1962–1963: Texas–Pan American

Administrative career (AD unless noted)
- c. 1954: Howard (AL)
- 1963–1966: Los Fresnos HS (TX)

Head coaching record
- Overall: 30–61–1 (college football); 71–73 (college basketball); 60–49 (college baseball)

Earl Lloyd Gartman (June 23, 1920 – March 8, 1995) was an American football, basketball, and baseball coach and college athletics administrator. He served as the head football coach at Howard College—now known as Samford University—in Homewood, Alabama from 1949 to 1953, at Austin Peay State University from 1958 to 1959, and at Trinity University in San Antonio, Texas from 1967 to 1969, compiling a career college football record of 30–61–1. Gartman was also the head basketball coach at Howard from 1950 to 1955, tallying a mark of 71–73. He was the head baseball coach at Howard from 1952 to 1955 and at the University of Texas–Pan American from 1962 to 1963, amassing a career college baseball record of 60–49.

== Education ==
Gartman graduated from Howard College and earned a master's degree at George Peabody College, now known as Peabody College, a part of Vanderbilt University.

== Head coaching record ==
=== College football ===
Year	Team	Overall	Conference	Standing	Bowl/playoffs
Howard Bulldogs (Dixie Conference) (1949–1953)
1949	Howard	4–5	2–0	2nd	
1950	Howard	2–8	0–3		
1951	Howard	2–3–1	1–1		
1952	Howard	5–4	0–2		
1953	Howard	1–8	0–2		
Howard:		14–28–1	3–8		
Austin Peay Governors (Volunteer State Athletic Conference) (1958–1959)
1958	Austin Peay	3–7			
1959	Austin Peay	1–9			
Austin Peay:		4–16			
Trinity Tigers (Southland Conference) (1967–1969)
1967	Trinity	3–7	1–3	4th	
1968	Trinity	5–4	2–2	3rd	
1969	Trinity	4–6	2–2	T–2nd	
Trinity:		12–17	5–7		
Total:		30–61–1			

=== Baseball ===
Record table
Season	Team	Overall	Conference	Standing	Postseason
Howard Bulldogs () (1952–1955)
1952	Howard	11–9			
1953	Howard	9–6			
1954	Howard	9–12			
1955	Howard	11–6			
Howard:		40–33			
Pan American Broncs (Independent) (1962–1963)
1962	Pan American	7–9			
1963	Pan American	13–7			
Pan American:		20–16			
Total:		60–49			
