= 1958 Drake Bulldogs football team =

American college football season

1958 Drake Bulldogs football
- Conference: Independent
- Record: 2–7
- Head coach: Warren Gaer (10th season)
- Home stadium: Drake Stadium

1958 Midwestern major college football independents records
	Conf.			Overall
Team	W	L	T	W		L		T
No. 17 Notre Dame		–		6	–	4	–	0
Detroit		–		4	–	4	–	1
Marquette		–		2	–	7	–	1
Drake		–		2	–	7	–	0
Dayton		–		2	–	8	–	0
Rankings from AP poll

The 1958 Drake Bulldogs football team represented the Drake University as an independent during the 1958 college football season. Led by Warren Gaer in his 10th season as head coach, the Bulldogs compiled an overall record of 2–7. Drake played home games at Drake Stadium in Des Moines, Iowa.

== Schedule ==
Date	Opponent	Site	Result	Attendance	Source
September 13	at South Dakota State	State Field; Brookings, SD	L 6–12	1,000	
September 20	at Iowa State	Clyde Williams Field; Ames, IA	L 0–33	12,806	
September 27	Colorado State	Drake Stadium; Des Moines, IA	L 0–21	16,000	
October 4	at Iowa State Teachers	O. R. Latham Stadium; Cedar Falls, IA	L 16–20	6,000	
October 11	North Texas State	Drake Stadium; Des Moines, IA	L 0–42	3,500	
October 18	at Tulsa	Skelly Stadium; Tulsa, OK	L 0–59	11,137	
October 25	Bradley	Drake Stadium; Des Moines, IA	W 14–12	4,000	
November 8	at Washington University	Francis Field; St. Louis, MO	W 28–21	7,500	
November 15	Wichita	Drake Stadium; Des Moines, IA	L 8–32	1,500	
