= Harry Larche =

American football player and coach (1923–2005)

Biographical details
- Born: July 12, 1923; Eros, Louisiana, U.S.
- Died: May 31, 2005 (aged 81)
- Education: Arkansas State University; University of Mississippi; Indiana University

Playing career
- 1946–1948: Arkansas State
- Position: Tackle

Coaching career (HC unless noted)
- 1951–1953: Arkansas State (line)
- 1954: Toledo (line)
- 1956: MVCDS (OH)
- 1957–1959: Toledo
- 1960–1962: Graceland
- 1964: Graceland
- 1969–1973: Graceland

Wrestling
- 1965–1966: Western Illinois

Head coaching record
- Overall: 46–57–4

Accomplishments and honors

Awards
- Arkansas State Ring of Honor (1998)

Harry Eugene Larche (July 12, 1923 – May 31, 2005) was an American college football player and coach. He served as the head coach at the University of Toledo from 1957 to 1959 and at Graceland University in three separate stints spanning 1960 to 1973.

== Playing career ==
A star tackle at Arkansas State University, Larche was captain of the 1948 Arkansas State Indians football team and was a member of the southern team in that year's Blue–Gray Football Classic. He was drafted by both the Baltimore Colts of the All-America Football Conference (AAFC) and the Green Bay Packers of the National Football League, but chose to sign with the Colts. He was waived by the team on August 31, 1949.

Larche graduated from Arkansas State with a Bachelor of Education degree and later earned a Master of Education from the University of Mississippi and a Doctor of Education from Indiana University.

== Coaching ==
In 1951, Larche returned to his alma mater as an assistant football coach. In 1954, he followed head coach Forrest England to the University of Toledo. He left the school after one season to enter private business. In 1956, he was the head coach of the Maumee Valley Country Day School and led the school to a 6–1 record; its best season to that point.

On January 13, 1957, Toledo fired England and Jack Morton (who had served as interim football coach while England was recovering from a heart attack) and named Larche its new football coach. He compiled a 11–15–1 record over three seasons and resigned on December 2, 1959 after a 2–7–1 season.

In 1960, Larche became the head football coach at Graceland College. For the 1961 homecoming game, Larche suited up one of the school's administrative assistants, Clara Engle. With a safe lead over Tarkio College, Larche put Engle in for a single play in the fourth quarter, where she was instructed to run 15 yards down the field.

He left Graceland in 1965 to become head wrestling coach and an associate professor of physical education at Western Illinois University. The following year he became the head of the physical education department at Pan American College. He was removed from this position by president Ralph Schilling in 1968 after Larche criticized the school's grading system.

Larche returned to Graceland in 1969 and coached the football team through the 1973 season.

== Later life ==
From 1975 to 1989, Larche was a professor of physical education at Campbell University. In 1998, he was inducted into the Arkansas State football Ring of Honor.

== Head coaching record ==
Year	Team	Overall	Conference	Standing	Bowl/playoffs
Toledo Rockets (Mid American Conference) (1957–1959)
1957	Toledo	5–4	3–2	4th	
1958	Toledo	4–5	1–4	6th	
1959	Toledo	2–6–1	0–6	7th	
Toledo:		11–15–1	4–12		
Graceland Yellowjackets (Missouri College Athletic Union) (1960–1962)
1960	Graceland	2–7	0–4	6th	
1961	Graceland	5–2–2	3–2	3rd	
1962	Graceland	4–5	2–3	4th	
Graceland Yellowjackets (Missouri College Athletic Union) (1964)
1964	Graceland	4–4	3–2	3rd	
Graceland Yellowjackets (Missouri College Athletic Union) (1969–1970)
1969	Graceland	0–9	0–5	6th	
1970	Graceland	1–8	0–5	6th	
Graceland Yellowjackets (Heart of America Athletic Conference) (1971–1972)
1971	Graceland	6–2–1	4–2–1	2nd	
1972	Graceland	7–2	5–2	T–2nd	
1973	Graceland	6–4	3–4	5th	
Graceland:		35–42–3	20–29–1		
Total:		46–57–4			
