= 1958 Western Michigan Broncos football team =

American college football season

1958 Western Michigan Broncos football
- Conference: Mid-American Conference
- Record: 4–5 (2–4 MAC)
- Head coach: Merle Schlosser (2nd season)
- MVP: Lovell Coleman
- Captains: Jack Krueger; Jim Eger
- Home stadium: Waldo Stadium

1958 Mid-American Conference football standings
	Conf.					Overall
Team	W		L		T	W		L		T
No. 2 Miami (OH) $	5	–	0	–	0	6	–	3	–	0
Kent State	5	–	1	–	0	7	–	2	–	0
No. 14 Bowling Green	4	–	2	–	0	7	–	2	–	0
Ohio	2	–	4	–	0	5	–	4	–	0
Western Michigan	2	–	4	–	0	4	–	5	–	0
Toledo	1	–	4	–	0	4	–	5	–	0
Marshall	1	–	5	–	0	3	–	6	–	0
$ – Conference champion; Rankings from UPI small college poll

The 1958 Western Michigan Broncos football team represented Western Michigan University in the Mid-American Conference (MAC) during the 1958 college football season. In their second season under head coach Merle Schlosser, the Broncos compiled a 4–5 record (2–4 against MAC opponents), finished in fifth place in the MAC, and were outscored by their opponents, 200 to 188. The team played its home games at Waldo Stadium in Kalamazoo, Michigan.

Guard Jack Krueger and center Jim Eger were the team captains. Fullback Lovell Coleman received the team's most outstanding player award. Coleman rushed for 1,068 yards in the 1958, including a school record 279 yards against Central Michigan.

== Schedule ==
Date	Opponent	Site	Result	Attendance	Source
September 20	Central Michigan*	Waldo Stadium; Kalamazoo, MI (rivalry)	L 32–33	15,300	
September 27	at No. T–16 Miami (OH)	Miami Field; Oxford, OH	L 20–34		
October 4	at Marshall	Fairfield Stadium; Huntington, WV	W 30–24		
October 11	No. 7 Bowling Green	Waldo Stadium; Kalamazoo, MI	L 6–40	5,500–6,500	
October 18	at Washington University*	Francis Field; St. Louis, MO	W 34–2		
October 25	Toledo	Waldo Stadium; Kalamazoo, MI	L 6–21	11,000	
November 1	Ohio	Waldo Stadium; Kalamazoo, MI	W 21–14	6,000	
November 8	Western Reserve*	Waldo Stadium; Kalamazoo, MI	W 33–0	3,000	
November 15	at Kent State	Memorial Stadium; Kent, OH	L 6–32	2,500	
*Non-conference game; Rankings from UPI Poll released prior to the game
