= Harry Connolly (American football) =

American football player (1920–2006)

No. 93
- Positions: Halfback, fullback, quarterback

Personal information
- Born: July 16, 1920; Norwalk, Connecticut, U.S.
- Died: January 14, 2006 (aged 85); New Bedford, Massachusetts, U.S.
- Listed height: 5 ft 11 in (1.80 m)
- Listed weight: 190 lb (86 kg)

Career information
- High school: Norwalk
- College: Boston College
- NFL draft: 1943: 5th round, 37th overall pick

Career history

Playing
- Brooklyn Dodgers (1946)

Coaching
- Notre Dame HS (CT) (1948); The Aquinas Institute of Rochester (NY) (1949–1952) Head coach; Indiana (1953–1954) Backfield coach; Xavier (1955–1958) Head coach

Awards and highlights
- Second-team All-Eastern (1942)
- Stats at Pro Football Reference

Harry William Connolly (July 16, 1920 January 14, 2006), also known as Mickey Connolly, was an American football halfback, fullback, and quarterback. After his playing career, Connolly served as a head football coach with his most notable tenure being that as head coach at Xavier University.

== Early life ==
Connolly was born in Norwalk, Connecticut, in 1920 and attended Norwalk High School. He played high school football at Norwalk under Frank Leahy, who coached on a part-time basis while serving as the line coach at Fordham University. When Leahy became the head coach at Boston College, he recruited Connolly to play for him there.

== Career ==
Connolly followed Leahy and played college football for the Boston College Eagles from 1940 to 1942. He was a versatile player known for his speed as a runner, passing ability, kicking, and also his propensity for intercepting passes on defense. In November 1942, The Boston Globe called him "B. C.'s best all-round athlete, most versatile football player".

Connolly was selected by the Steagles in the fifth round (37th overall pick) of the 1943 NFL draft. He never played in the NFL. Instead, he served in the Navy during World War II. He was assigned to the North Carolina Pre-Flight Cloudbusters football team.

After the war, Connolly played in the All-America Football Conference for the Brooklyn Dodgers in 1946. He appeared in three games, two of them as a starter, and rushed for 18 yards on eight carries and completed two passes for 29 yards.

After his playing career, Connolly became a coach at the high school and college level. In 1948 he coached at Notre Dame High School in West Haven, Connecticut and then served as head coach at The Aquinas Institute of Rochester in Rochester, New York from 1949 to 1952. Connolly next served as backfield coach at Indiana before he was hired as head coach at Xavier in January 1955. Connolly served as head coach of the Musketeers from 1955 to 1958 and compiled an overall record of 24–15, but he subsequently resigned in June 1959.

== Death ==
Connolly died in 2006 in New Bedford, Massachusetts.

== Head coaching record ==
Year	Team	Overall	Conference	Standing	Bowl/playoffs
Xavier Musketeers (Independent) (1955–1958)
1955	Xavier	7–2			
1956	Xavier	7–3			
1957	Xavier	5–5			
1958	Xavier	5–5			
Xavier:		24–15			
Total:		24–15			
