= 1958 Marshall Thundering Herd football team =

American college football season

1958 Marshall Thundering Herd football
- Conference: Mid-American Conference
- Record: 3–6 (1–5 MAC)
- Head coach: Herb Royer (6th season)
- Captains: Vernon Howell; Sonny Sirianni
- Home stadium: Fairfield Stadium

1958 Mid-American Conference football standings
	Conf.					Overall
Team	W		L		T	W		L		T
No. 2 Miami (OH) $	5	–	0	–	0	6	–	3	–	0
Kent State	5	–	1	–	0	7	–	2	–	0
No. 14 Bowling Green	4	–	2	–	0	7	–	2	–	0
Ohio	2	–	4	–	0	5	–	4	–	0
Western Michigan	2	–	4	–	0	4	–	5	–	0
Toledo	1	–	4	–	0	4	–	5	–	0
Marshall	1	–	5	–	0	3	–	6	–	0
$ – Conference champion; Rankings from UPI small college poll

The 1958 Marshall Thundering Herd football team was an American football team that represented Marshall University in the Mid-American Conference (MAC) during the 1958 college football season. In its sixth season under head coach Herb Royer, the team compiled a 3–6 record (1–5 against conference opponents), finished in seventh place out of seven teams in the MAC, and was outscored by a total of 165 to 111. Vernon Howell and Sonny Sirianni were the team captains. The team played its home games at Fairfield Stadium in Huntington, West Virginia.

== Schedule ==
Date	Opponent	Site	Result	Attendance	Source
September 20	at West Virginia State*	Institute, WV	W 9–0		
September 27	at Morehead State*	Morehead, KY	W 30–16		
October 4	Western Michigan	Fairfield Stadium; Huntington, WV	L 24–30		
October 11	Toledo	Fairfield Stadium; Huntington, WV	W 35–12		
October 18	at No. T–20 Kent State	Memorial Stadium; Kent, OH	L 0–24	6,000	
October 25	at Ohio	Peden Stadium; Athens, OH (rivalry)	L 0–22	4,000	
November 1	Xavier*^{†}	Fairfield Stadium; Huntington, WV	L 6–14	3,500	
November 8	No. 3 Miami (OH)	Fairfield Stadium; Huntington, WV	L 0–26		
November 15	at No. 12 Bowling Green	University Stadium; Bowling Green, OH	L 7–21	2,100	
*Non-conference game; ^{†}Homecoming; Rankings from UPI Poll released prior to the game
