= Terry Brennan =

American football player and coach (1928–2021)

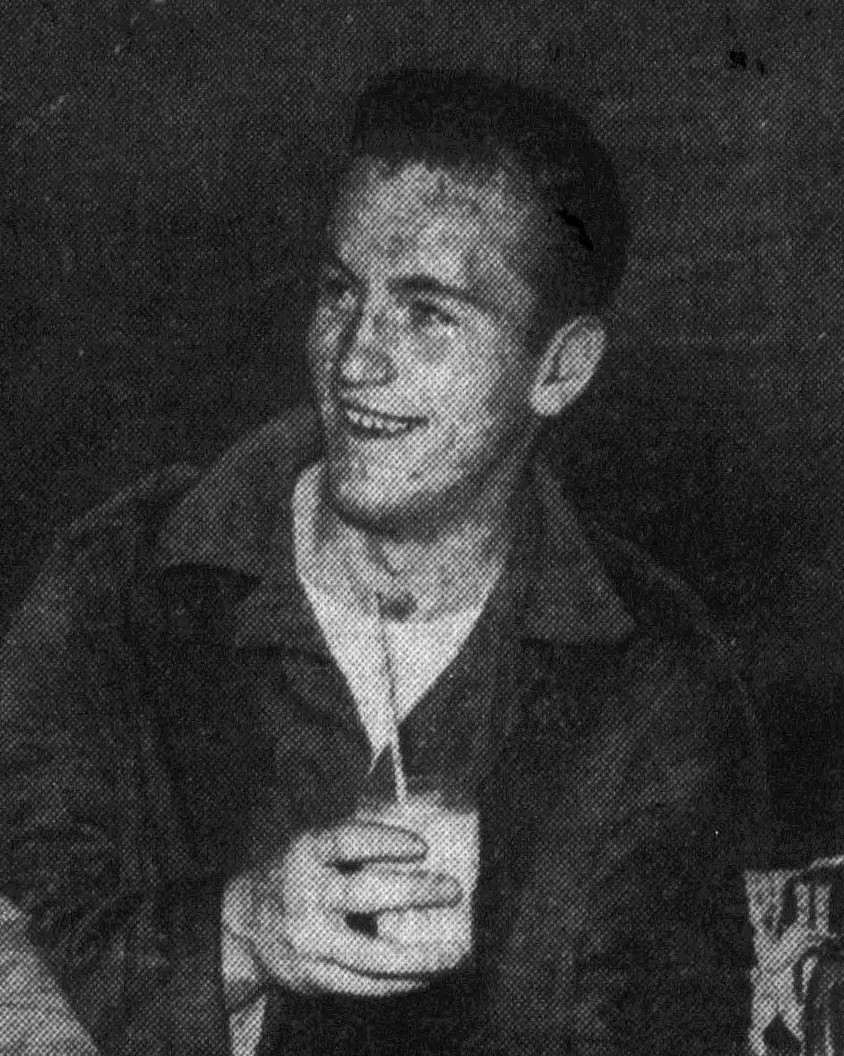
- Brennan, circa 1946

Biographical details
- Born: June 11, 1928; Milwaukee, Wisconsin, U.S.
- Died: September 7, 2021 (aged 93); Northbrook, Illinois, U.S.

Playing career
- 1945–1948: Notre Dame
- Position: Halfback

Coaching career (HC unless noted)
- 1949–1952: Chicago Mount Carmel HS (IL)
- 1953: Notre Dame (freshmen)
- 1954–1958: Notre Dame

Head coaching record
- Overall: 32–18 (college)

Accomplishments and honors

Championships
- 2× National (1946, 1947)

Awards
- Third-team All-American (1947)

Terence Patrick Brennan (June 11, 1928 – September 7, 2021) was an American college football player and coach. He served as the head football coach at the University of Notre Dame from 1954 to 1958, compiling a record of 32–18.

== Early life and playing career ==
A native of the Village of Whitefish Bay, Wisconsin, a suburb of Milwaukee, Wisconsin, Terry Brennan was a standout multi-sport athlete at Marquette University High School. He went on to play halfback at the University of Notre Dame from 1945 to 1948, graduating in 1949.

In 1951, he married Mary Louise "Kel" Kelley. His wife died in 2001, following fifty years of marriage.

== Coaching career ==
After graduating from Notre Dame, Brennan coached at Mount Carmel High School in Chicago and won three successive city championships. Brennan returned to Notre Dame in 1953 as freshman football coach and succeeded Frank Leahy as head coach the following year.

In 1954, Notre Dame had a 9–1 record, with players recruited by Leahy. In 1955, the Irish were 8–2. In 1956, Brennan had mostly sophomore starters, due to numerous injuries; the result was a 2–8 record, and the first losing season for Notre Dame since 1933 and the worst in school history. However, running back Paul Hornung won the Heisman Trophy that year.

Brennan's 1957 squad earned the nickname, "Comeback Comets" after finishing 7–3. Among their victories was a 23–21 comeback over Army and a 7–0 shutout of Oklahoma, snapping the Sooners' NCAA record 47-game winning streak.

After a 6–4 record in 1958, the movement to dismiss Brennan gained momentum, and the coach was fired along with his entire staff in mid-December; Hugh Devore was eventually retained. Notre Dame's administration was heavily criticized for the firing, considering Brennan's overall 32–18 record against the caliber of their opponents. He was succeeded as Notre Dame's head coach by Joe Kuharich.

== Later life and honors ==
Brennan served as player conditioning coach for baseball's Cincinnati Reds during spring training in 1959 and eventually joined a Chicago investment banking firm.

Brennan is a member of the Chicagoland Sports Hall of Fame and was elected to the Wisconsin Athletic Hall of Fame in 1981.

He was the author of the book Though The Odds be Great or Small, about the 1957 Notre Dame football season, which was published in 2021.

== Death ==
Brennan's grave at Sacred Heart Cemetery

He died on September 7, 2021, at the age of 93, and was buried at Sacred Heart Cemetery in Northbrook, Illinois. He is survived by his six children, 42 grandchildren, and 32 great-grandchildren.

== Head coaching record ==
=== College ===
Year	Team	Overall	Conference	Standing	Bowl/playoffs	Coaches^{#}	AP^{°}
Notre Dame Fighting Irish (Independent) (1954–1958)
1954	Notre Dame	9–1				4	4
1955	Notre Dame	8–2				10	9
1956	Notre Dame	2–8					
1957	Notre Dame	7–3				9	10
1958	Notre Dame	6–4				14	17
Notre Dame:		32–18					
Total:		32–18					
^{#}Rankings from final Coaches Poll.; ^{°}Rankings from final AP Poll.
