= 1958 California Vulcans football team =

American college football season

1958 California Vulcans football

PSTCC champion
- Conference: Pennsylvania State Teachers College Conference
- Record: 8–0 (6–0 PSTCC)
- Head coach: Ted Nemeth (9th season)

1958 Pennsylvania State Teachers College Conference football standings
| | Conf. | | | | | Overall |
| Team | W | | L | | T | W | | L | | T |
|---|---|---|---|---|---|---|---|---|---|---|
| California (PA) $ | 6 | – | 0 | – | 0 | 8 | – | 0 | – | 0 |
| No. T–16 West Chester | 6 | – | 0 | – | 0 | 9 | – | 1 | – | 0 |
| Indiana (PA) | 4 | – | 1 | – | 0 | 5 | – | 3 | – | 0 |
| Lock Haven | 5 | – | 2 | – | 0 | 5 | – | 3 | – | 0 |
| Bloomsburg | 3 | – | 2 | – | 1 | 5 | – | 2 | – | 1 |
| Slippery Rock | 2 | – | 3 | – | 1 | 2 | – | 6 | – | 1 |
| Millersville | 3 | – | 3 | – | 0 | 6 | – | 3 | – | 0 |
| Shippensburg | 3 | – | 4 | – | 0 | 4 | – | 4 | – | 0 |
| Edinboro | 2 | – | 4 | – | 1 | 4 | – | 4 | – | 1 |
| Clarion | 2 | – | 4 | – | 0 | 3 | – | 6 | – | 0 |
| East Stroudsburg | 1 | – | 3 | – | 1 | 2 | – | 5 | – | 2 |
| Kutztown | 1 | – | 2 | – | 0 | 3 | – | 3 | – | 1 |
| Mansfield | 1 | – | 6 | – | 0 | 2 | – | 6 | – | 0 |
| Cheyney | 0 | – | 5 | – | 0 | 0 | – | 7 | – | 0 |
$ – Conference champion; Conference standings were based on the Saylor system of ratings.; Rankings from UPI small college poll

The 1958 California Vulcans football team was an American football team that represented the California State Teachers College (now known as California University of Pennsylvania) of California, Pennsylvania, as a member of the Pennsylvania State Teachers College Conference (PSTCC) during the 1958 college football season. In their ninth year under head coach Ted Nemeth, the Vulcans compiled a perfect 8–0 record (6–0 against PSTCC opponents), won the PSTCC championship, and outscored opponents by a total of 202 to 31.

California and West Chester both compiled undefeated records against conference opponents, but California was declared the conference champion under the "Saylor-system" used by the PSTCC which took into account overall win-loss record and caliber of opposition. It was the first time a team from western Pennsylvania won the PSTCC championship.

California's senior left halfback Carl Trimber was the leading scorer in the PSTCC. The Vulcans also had the best scoring defense in the conference, giving up only 31 points in eight games. Against the rush, the Vulcans allowed an average of only 42 yards per game.

== Schedule ==
| Date | Opponent | Site | Result | Source |
|---|---|---|---|---|
| September 27 | Indiana (PA) | California, PA | W 13–0 | |
| October 4 | Lock Haven | California, PA | W 20–7 | |
| October 11 | at Shippensburg | Shippensburg, PA | W 19–0 | |
| October 18 | Slippery Rock | California, PA | W 34–6 | |
| October 25 | Clarion | California, PA | W 28–0 | |
| November 1 | at Susquehanna* | Selinsgrove, PA | W 34–12 | |
| November 8 | at Edinboro | Edinboro, PA | W 13–0 | |
| November 15 | at Washington & Jefferson* | Cameron Stadium; Washington, PA | W 41–6 | |
*Non-conference game

== Players ==
- Curt Calamari, tackle, senior
- George Kupets, defensive halfback and backup quarterback, senior
- Pete Petroff, center, senior
- Jack Scarvel, guard and defensive captain, senior
- Carl Trimber, left halfback, senior
- Adam Vlanich, end, senior
