= 1958 Xavier Musketeers football team =

American college football season

1958 Xavier Musketeers football
- Conference: Independent
- Record: 5–5
- Head coach: Harry Connolly (4th season)
- Home stadium: Xavier Stadium

1958 Midwestern non-major college football independents records
	Conf.			Overall
Team	W	L	T	W		L		T
Rose Poly		–		8	–	0	–	0
North Park		–		7	–	1	–	0
Carthage		–		7	–	2	–	0
Baldwin–Wallace		–		4	–	4	–	1
Northern Michigan		–		5	–	5	–	0
Xavier		–		5	–	5	–	0
Washington University		–		4	–	4	–	0
St. Norbert		–		3	–	6	–	0
Wabash		–		3	–	6	–	0

The 1958 Xavier Musketeers football team was an American football team that represented Xavier University as an independent during the 1958 college football season. In their fourth season under head coach Harry Connolly, the Musketeers compiled a 5–5 record. They team played their home games at Xavier Stadium in Cincinnati, Ohio.

== Schedule ==
Date	Time	Opponent	Site	Result	Attendance	Source
September 14	8:00 p.m.	Saint Joseph's (IN)	Xavier Stadium; Cincinnati, OH	W 8–0	11,500	
September 20	2:00 p.m.	Kent State	Xavier Stadium; Cincinnati, OH	L 0–6	7,500	
September 28	8:00 p.m.	Quantico Marines	Xavier Stadium; Cincinnati, OH	L 20–31	7,000	
October 4	2:00 p.m.	at No. 5 Miami (OH)	Miami Field; Oxford, OH	W 22–8	9,519	
October 11	2:00 p.m.	at Cincinnati	Nippert Stadium; Cincinnati, OH (rivalry)	L 8–14	26,000	
October 18	2:00 p.m.	Detroit^{†}	Xavier Stadium; Cincinnati, OH	L 6–31	9,000–10,000	
October 25	8:00 p.m.	Dayton	Xavier Stadium; Cincinnati, OH	W 16–0	6,500	
November 1	2:00 p.m.	at Marshall^{†}	Fairfield Stadium; Huntington, WV	W 14–6	3,500	
November 8	8:15 p.m.	Toledo	Glass Bowl; Toledo, OH	W 34–8		
November 15	2:00 p.m.	at Kentucky	McLean Stadium; Lexington, KY	L 6–20	25,000	
^{†}Homecoming; Rankings from UPI Poll released prior to the game; All times are in Eastern time
