= 1958 Tampa Spartans football team =

American college football season

1958 Tampa Spartans football
- Conference: Independent
- Record: 6–4
- Head coach: Marcelino Huerta (7th season)
- Home stadium: Phillips Field

1958 Southern non-major college football independents records
	Conf.			Overall
Team	W	L	T	W		L		T
No. 1 Mississippi Southern		–		9	–	0	–	0
Sewanee		–		8	–	0	–	0
Trinity (TX)		–		6	–	3	–	0
Tampa		–		6	–	4	–	0
Abilene Christian		–		5	–	5	–	0
No. 8 Chattanooga		–		5	–	5	–	0
Louisville		–		4	–	4	–	0
Arkansas State		–		4	–	5	–	0
No. 18 Memphis State		–		4	–	5	–	0
Howard (AL)		–		1	–	5	–	1
Washington and Lee		–		1	–	7	–	0
Rankings from UPI small college poll

The 1958 Tampa Spartans football team represented the University of Tampa in the 1958 college football season. It was the Spartans' 22nd season. The team was led by head coach Marcelino Huerta, in his seventh year, and played their home games at Phillips Field in Tampa, Florida. They finished with a record of six wins and four losses (6–4).

== Schedule ==
Date	Opponent	Site	Result	Attendance	Source
September 27	Troy State	Phillips Field; Tampa, FL	W 39–6	5,500–6,000	
October 4	Western Carolina	Phillips Field; Tampa, FL	W 19–12	5,000	
October 11	at Arkansas State	Kays Stadium; Jonesboro, AR	W 20–14	4,000	
October 18	VMI	Phillips Field; Tampa, FL	L 12–13	5,000	
October 25	Presbyterian^{†}	Phillips Field; Tampa, FL	W 18–6	6,200	
November 1	at Florida State	Doak Campbell Stadium; Tallahassee, FL	L 0–43	17,083	
November 8	Jacksonville State	Phillips Field; Tampa, FL	W 12–6	2,200	
November 15	No. 3 Chattanooga	Phillips Field; Tampa, FL	W 25–19	6,000	
November 22	vs. Appalachian State	Bryant Field; Lakeland, FL	L 26–34	4,500	
November 29	Southeastern Louisiana	Phillips Field; Tampa, FL	L 0–19	3,500	
^{†}Homecoming; Rankings from UPI Poll released prior to the game
