= 1958 Marquette Warriors football team =

American college football season

1958 Marquette Warriors football
- Conference: Independent
- Record: 2–7–1
- Head coach: John F. Druze (3rd season)
- Home stadium: Marquette Stadium, Milwaukee County Stadium

1958 Midwestern major college football independents records
	Conf.			Overall
Team	W	L	T	W		L		T
No. 17 Notre Dame		–		6	–	4	–	0
Detroit		–		4	–	4	–	1
Marquette		–		2	–	7	–	1
Drake		–		2	–	7	–	0
Dayton		–		2	–	8	–	0
Rankings from AP poll

The 1958 Marquette Warriors football team was an American football team that represented Marquette University as an independent during the 1958 college football season. In its third and final season under head coach John F. Druze, the team compiled a 2–7–1 record and was outscored by a total of 257 to 107. Peter Hall was the strting quarterback and also played on defense, including the full 60 minutes against Boston College.

The team played its home games at Marquette Stadium (one game) and Milwaukee County Stadium (three games) in Milwaukee. Attendance at County Stadium dropped to a low of 4,053 for a November 15 game against Cincinnati.

== Schedule ==
Date	Opponent	Site	Result	Attendance	Source
September 20	South Dakota State	Marquette Stadium; Milwaukee, WI	W 18–7	11,500	
October 4	at No. 9 Wisconsin	Camp Randall Stadium; Madison, WI	L 0–50	42,513	
October 11	at Penn State	New Beaver Field; University Park, PA	L 8–40	22,000	
October 18	Boston College	Milwaukee County Stadium; Milwaukee, WI	L 13–21	7,016	
October 25	Pacific (CA)^{†}	Milwaukee County Stadium; Milwaukee, WI	W 28–18	10,711	
November 1	at Detroit	University of Detroit Stadium; Detroit, MI	T 14–14	11,635	
November 8	at No. 11 TCU	Amon G. Carter Stadium; Fort Worth, TX	L 8–36	15,000	
November 15	Cincinnati	Milwaukee County Stadium; Milwaukee, WI	L 0–15	4,053	
November 22	at Holy Cross	Fitton Field; Worcester, MA	L 0–14	7,000	
November 29	at Arizona State	Sun Devil Stadium; Tempe, AZ	L 18–42	24,000	
^{†}Homecoming; Rankings from AP Poll released prior to the game; Source:
