= 1958 Arkansas State Indians football team =

American college football season

1958 Arkansas State Indians football
- Conference: Independent
- Record: 4–5
- Head coach: Hugh Taylor (1st season)
- Home stadium: Kays Stadium

1958 Southern non-major college football independents records
	Conf.			Overall
Team	W	L	T	W		L		T
No. 1 Mississippi Southern		–		9	–	0	–	0
Sewanee		–		8	–	0	–	0
Trinity (TX)		–		6	–	3	–	0
Tampa		–		6	–	4	–	0
Abilene Christian		–		5	–	5	–	0
No. 8 Chattanooga		–		5	–	5	–	0
Louisville		–		4	–	4	–	0
Arkansas State		–		4	–	5	–	0
No. 18 Memphis State		–		4	–	5	–	0
Howard (AL)		–		1	–	5	–	1
Washington and Lee		–		1	–	7	–	0
Rankings from UPI small college poll

The 1958 Arkansas State Indians football team represented Arkansas State College—now known as Arkansas State University—as an independent during the 1958 college football season. Led by first-year head coach Hugh Taylor, the Indians compiled a record of 4–5. This was the first season in which Arkansas State played against a top-25 team. The Indians lost to No. 18 Florida.

== Schedule ==
Date	Opponent	Site	Result	Attendance	Source
September 27	Louisiana Tech	Kays Stadium; Jonesboro, AR	L 7–14		
October 4	at Florence State	Municipal Stadium; Florence, AL	L 0–19		
October 11	Tampa	Kays Stadium; Jonesboro, AR	L 14–20	4,000	
October 18	at Mississippi State	Scott Field; Starkville, MS	L 0–38	12,000	
October 25	Austin Peay	Kays Stadium; Jonesboro, AR	W 16–0		
November 1	at Murray State	Cutchin Stadium; Murray, KY	W 20–14		
November 8	Southern State	Kays Stadium; Jonesboro, AR	W 48–13		
November 15	at No. 18 Florida	Florida Field; Gainesville, FL	L 7–51	19,030	
November 22	Arkansas Tech	Kays Stadium; Jonesboro, AR	W 50–7		
Rankings from AP Poll released prior to the game
