= 1958 Toledo Rockets football team =

American college football season

1958 Toledo Rockets football
- Conference: Mid-American Conference
- Record: 4–5 (1–4 MAC)
- Head coach: Harry Larche (2nd season)
- Home stadium: Glass Bowl

1958 Mid-American Conference football standings
	Conf.					Overall
Team	W		L		T	W		L		T
No. 2 Miami (OH) $	5	–	0	–	0	6	–	3	–	0
Kent State	5	–	1	–	0	7	–	2	–	0
No. 14 Bowling Green	4	–	2	–	0	7	–	2	–	0
Ohio	2	–	4	–	0	5	–	4	–	0
Western Michigan	2	–	4	–	0	4	–	5	–	0
Toledo	1	–	4	–	0	4	–	5	–	0
Marshall	1	–	5	–	0	3	–	6	–	0
$ – Conference champion; Rankings from UPI small college poll

The 1958 Toledo Rockets football team was an American football team that represented Toledo University in the Mid-American Conference (MAC) during the 1958 college football season. In their second season under head coach Harry Larche, the Rockets compiled a 4–5 record (1–4 against MAC opponents), finished in sixth place in the MAC, and were outscored by their opponents by a combined total of 168 to 122.

The team's statistical leaders included Jerry Stoltz with 403 passing yards, Occie Burt with 618 rushing yards, and Jack Campbell with 214 receiving yards.

== Schedule ==
Date	Opponent	Site	Result	Attendance	Source
September 20	Eastern Kentucky*	Glass Bowl; Toledo, OH	W 19–2	8,000	
September 27	at No. 5 Ohio	Peden Stadium; Athens, OH	L 6–13	7,500	
October 4	No. T–20 Louisville*	Glass Bowl; Toledo, OH	W 13–7	8,000	
October 11	at Marshall	Fairfield Stadium; Huntington, WV	L 12–35		
October 18	No. 5 Bowling Green	Glass Bowl; Toledo, OH (rivalry)	L 16–31	9,500–10,500	
October 25	at Western Michigan	Waldo Stadium; Kalamazoo, MI	W 21–6	11,000	
November 1	at No. 19 Kent State	Memorial Stadium; Kent, OH	L 6–32	8,000	
November 8	Xavier*	Glass Bowl; Toledo, OH	L 8–34	3,000	
November 15	Youngstown State*	Glass Bowl; Toledo, OH	W 21–8	5,000	
*Non-conference game; Rankings from UPI Poll released prior to the game
