= 1958 Hamilton Continentals football team =

American college football season

1958 Hamilton Continentals football
- Conference: Independent
- Record: 6–0–1
- Head coach: Donald M. Jones (10th season)
- Home stadium: Steuben Field

1958 Eastern non-major college football independents records
| | Conf. | | | Overall |
| Team | W | L | T | W | | L | | T |
|---|---|---|---|---|---|---|---|---|
| Rochester | | – | | 8 | – | 0 | – | 0 |
| Hamilton | | – | | 6 | – | 0 | – | 1 |
| No. 10 Buffalo | | – | | 8 | – | 1 | – | 0 |
| Southern Connecticut State | | – | | 7 | – | 2 | – | 0 |
| Carnegie Tech | | – | | 6 | – | 2 | – | 0 |
| Northeastern | | – | | 6 | – | 2 | – | 0 |
| Hofstra | | – | | 6 | – | 4 | – | 0 |
Rankings from UPI small college poll

The 1958 Hamilton Continentals football team was an American football team that represented Hamilton College of Clinton, New York, as an independent during the 1958 college football season. In their 10th season under head coach Donald M. Jones, the Continentals compiled an undefeated 6–0–1 record and outscored their opponents 163 to 59.

The team gained 994 rushing yards and 601 passing yards. On defense, they gave up 654 rushing yards and 429 passing yards. The team's individual leaders included:

- Left halfback Earl Rickerson led the team with 349 rushing yards on 70 carries.
- Sophomore quarterback Richard Blessing completed 28 of 57 passes for 375 yards, six touchdowns, and three interceptions.
- Senior left end John Stevens, 6'2", 195 pounds, caught 19 passes for 279 yards and five touchdowns.
- Senior fullback Mike Slattery, 5'9", 195 pounds, was the team's scoring leader with 50 points on eight touchdowns and a two-point conversion.

The team played its home games at Steuben Field in Clinton, Oneida County, New York.

== Schedule ==
| Date | Opponent | Site | Result | Attendance | Source |
|---|---|---|---|---|---|
| September 27 | Merchant Marine | Steuben Field; Clinton, NY | W 25–6 | | |
| October 4 | RPI | Steuben Field; Clinton, NY | W 34–14 | 3,200 | |
| October 11 | at Wagner | Grymes Hill Stadium; Staten Island, NY | W 20–13 | 3,000 | |
| October 18 | Swarthmore | Steuben Field; Clinton, NY | W 34–8 | 1,700 | |
| October 25 | at Haverford | Walton Field; Haverford, PA | W 20–6 | | |
| November 8 | at Hobart | Geneva, NY | T 12–12 | 2,500–3,500 | |
| November 15 | Union (NY) | Steuben Field; Clinton, NY | W 18–0 | 1,000 | |
