= 1958 Miami Redskins football team =

American college football season

1958 Miami Redskins football

MAC champion
- Conference: Mid-American Conference
- Record: 6–3 (5–0 MAC)
- Head coach: John Pont (3rd season)
- Captain: John Drew
- Home stadium: Miami Field

1958 Mid-American Conference football standings
	Conf.					Overall
Team	W		L		T	W		L		T
No. 2 Miami (OH) $	5	–	0	–	0	6	–	3	–	0
Kent State	5	–	1	–	0	7	–	2	–	0
No. 14 Bowling Green	4	–	2	–	0	7	–	2	–	0
Ohio	2	–	4	–	0	5	–	4	–	0
Western Michigan	2	–	4	–	0	4	–	5	–	0
Toledo	1	–	4	–	0	4	–	5	–	0
Marshall	1	–	5	–	0	3	–	6	–	0
$ – Conference champion; Rankings from UPI small college poll

The 1958 Miami Redskins football team was an American football team that represented Miami University in the Mid-American Conference (MAC) during the 1958 college football season. In its third season under head coach John Pont, Miami compiled a 6–3 record (5–0 against MAC opponents), won the MAC championship, shut out three opponents, and outscored all opponents by a combined total of 193 to 96.

John Drew was the team captain. The team's statistical leaders included Harold Williams with 566 rushing yards, Nick Mourouzis with 191 passing yards and Dave Girbert with 65 receiving yards.

== Schedule ==
Date	Opponent	Rank	Site	Result	Attendance	Source
September 27	Western Michigan	No. T–16	Miami Field; Oxford, OH	W 34–20		
October 4	Xavier*	No. 5	Miami Field; Oxford, OH	L 8–22	9,519	
October 11	No. 6 Kent State	No. T–13	Miami Field; Oxford, OH	W 35–0	9,000	
October 18	at No. 13 Ohio	No. 6	Peden Stadium; Athens, OH (rivalry)	W 14–10	10,882	
October 25	at Indiana*	No. 6	Memorial Stadium; Bloomington, IN	L 7–12	18,000	
November 1	No. 6 Bowling Green	No. 3	Miami Field; Oxford, OH	W 28–14	11,000	
November 8	at Marshall	No. 3	Fairfield Stadium; Huntington, WV	W 26–0		
November 15	Dayton*	No. 2	Miami Field; Oxford, OH	W 34–0	6,400	
November 27	at Cincinnati*	No. 2	Nippert Stadium; Cincinnati, OH (rivalry)	L 7–18		
*Non-conference game; Rankings from UPI Poll released prior to the game
