= 1958 Sewanee Tigers football team =

American college football season

1958 Sewanee Tigers football
- Conference: Independent
- Record: 8–0
- Head coach: Shirley Majors (2nd season)
- Captain: Andy Finlay
- Home stadium: Hardee Field

1958 Southern non-major college football independents records
	Conf.			Overall
Team	W	L	T	W		L		T
No. 1 Mississippi Southern		–		9	–	0	–	0
Sewanee		–		8	–	0	–	0
Trinity (TX)		–		6	–	3	–	0
Tampa		–		6	–	4	–	0
Abilene Christian		–		5	–	5	–	0
No. 8 Chattanooga		–		5	–	5	–	0
Louisville		–		4	–	4	–	0
Arkansas State		–		4	–	5	–	0
No. 18 Memphis State		–		4	–	5	–	0
Howard (AL)		–		1	–	5	–	1
Washington and Lee		–		1	–	7	–	0
Rankings from UPI small college poll

The 1958 Sewanee Tigers football team was an American football team that represented Sewanee: The University of the South as an independent during the 1958 college football season. In their second season under head coach Shirley Majors, the Tigers compiled a perfect 8–0 record, shut out six of eight opponents, and outscored all opponents by a total of 285 (34 points per games) to 28 (3.5 points per game). It Sewanee's first undefeated and untied football season since 1899.

Three Sewanee players were selected as All-Americans: Dan Davis, fullback and captain Andy Finlay, and center Bobby Potts.

In 2008, the 1958 team was inducted as a group into the Sewanee Athletics Hall of Fame. The 1899 football team was inducted in 2004 and the 1963 football team in 2010.

The team played its home games at Hardee Field in Sewanee, Tennessee.

== Schedule ==
Date	Opponent	Site	Result	Attendance	Source
September 26	at Howard (AL)	Howard Stadium; Homewood, AL	W 21–0	2,000	
October 4	Millsaps	Hardee Field; Sewanee, TN	W 47–0	1,100	
October 11	at Hampden–Sydney	Hampden Sydney, VA	W 44–20		
October 17	at Mississippi College	Clinton, MS	W 48–8		
October 25	Maryville	Hardee Field; Sewanee, TN	W 46–0		
November 1	Centre^{†}	Hardee Field; Sewanee, TN	W 20–0		
November 8	at Washington and Lee	Lexington, VA (Cy Young Day)	W 12–0	2,000	
November 15	Southwestern (TN)	Hardee Field; Sewanee, TN (Edmund Orgill Trophy)	W 47–0		
^{†}Homecoming
