= 1958 Mississippi Southern Southerners football team =

American college football season

1958 Mississippi Southern Southerners football

UPI small college national champion
- Conference: Independent
- Record: 9–0
- Head coach: Thad Vann (10th season)
- Home stadium: Faulkner Field; Ladd Stadium

1958 Southern non-major college football independents records
	Conf.			Overall
Team	W	L	T	W		L		T
No. 1 Mississippi Southern		–		9	–	0	–	0
Sewanee		–		8	–	0	–	0
Trinity (TX)		–		6	–	3	–	0
Tampa		–		6	–	4	–	0
Abilene Christian		–		5	–	5	–	0
No. 8 Chattanooga		–		5	–	5	–	0
Louisville		–		4	–	4	–	0
Arkansas State		–		4	–	5	–	0
No. 18 Memphis State		–		4	–	5	–	0
Howard (AL)		–		1	–	5	–	1
Washington and Lee		–		1	–	7	–	0
Rankings from UPI small college poll

The 1958 Mississippi Southern Southerners football team was an American football team that represented Mississippi Southern College (now known as the University of Southern Mississippi) as an independent during the 1958 college football season. In their tenth year under head coach Thad Vann, the team compiled a 9–0 record and finished as UPI small college national champion.

== Schedule ==
Date	Time	Opponent	Rank	Site	Result	Attendance	Source
September 20		Louisiana Tech		Faulkner Field; Hattiesburg, MS (rivalry)	W 14–0	7,500	
September 27		at Trinity (TX)	No. 1	Alamo Stadium; San Antonio, TX	W 15–0	7,058	
October 4		No. T–15 Memphis State	No. 1	Faulkner Field; Hattiesburg, MS (rivalry)	W 24–22	11,000	
October 11		Southeastern Louisiana	No. 1	Faulkner Field; Hattiesburg, MS	W 33–6	9,500	
October 25	8:00 p.m.	West Texas State^{†}	No. 1	Faulkner Field; Hattiesburg, MS	W 15–0	14,000	
November 1		at Abilene Christian	No. 1	Abilene, TX	W 22–0	7,000	
November 8		NC State	No. 1	Ladd Stadium; Mobile, AL	W 26–14	18,987	
November 15		VPI	No. 1	Faulkner Field; Hattiesburg, MS	W 41–0	11,000	
November 27		at No. 7 Chattanooga	No. 1	Chamberlain Field; Chattanooga, TN	W 20–13	9,500	
^{†}Homecoming; Rankings from UPI Poll released prior to the game; All times are in Central time
