= 1958 Notre Dame Fighting Irish football team =

American college football season

1958 Notre Dame Fighting Irish football
- Conference: Independent

Ranking
- Coaches: No. 14
- AP: No. 17
- Record: 6–4
- Head coach: Terry Brennan (5th season)
- Captains: Al Ecuyer; Chuck Puntillo
- Home stadium: Notre Dame Stadium

1958 Midwestern major college football independents records
	Conf.			Overall
Team	W	L	T	W		L		T
No. 17 Notre Dame		–		6	–	4	–	0
Detroit		–		4	–	4	–	1
Marquette		–		2	–	7	–	1
Drake		–		2	–	7	–	0
Dayton		–		2	–	8	–	0
Rankings from AP poll

The 1958 Notre Dame Fighting Irish football team was an American football team that represented the University of Notre Dame as an independent during the 1958 college football season. In their fifth and final year under head coach Terry Brennan, the Irish compiled a 6–4 record, outscored opponents by a total of 206 to 173, and were ranked No. 17 in the final AP poll. In six games against ranked opponents, they defeated No. 17 SMU, No. 15 Navy, and No. 11 North Carolina, and lost to No. 3 Army, No. 15 Purdue, and No. 6 Iowa.

Three Notre Dame players received first-team honors on the 1958 All-America college football team: fullback Nick Pietrosante (AFCA, FWAA); guard Al Ecuyer (UPI, Central Press, Sporting News); and end Monty Stickles (Sporting News). The team's statistical leaders included Pietrosante (549 rushing yards); Stickles (328 receiving yards); and George Izo (1,067 passing yards).

The team played its home games at Notre Dame Stadium in Notre Dame, Indiana.

== Schedule ==
Date	Opponent	Rank	Site	Result	Attendance	Source
September 27	Indiana	No. 5	Notre Dame Stadium; Notre Dame, IN	W 18–0	49,347	
October 4	at No. 17 SMU	No. 7	Cotton Bowl; Dallas, TX	W 14–6	61,500	
October 11	No. 3 Army	No. 4	Notre Dame Stadium; Notre Dame, IN (rivalry)	L 2–14	60,564	
October 18	Duke	No. 12	Notre Dame Stadium; Notre Dame, IN	W 9–7	59,068	
October 25	No. 15 Purdue	No. 11	Notre Dame Stadium; Notre Dame, IN (rivalry)	L 22–29	59,563	
November 1	vs. No. 15 Navy		Memorial Stadium; Baltimore, MD (rivalry)	W 40–20	57,773	
November 8	at Pittsburgh	No. 14	Pitt Stadium; Pittsburgh, PA (rivalry)	L 26–29	55,330	
November 15	No. 11 North Carolina		Notre Dame Stadium; Notre Dame, IN (rivalry)	W 34–24	56,839	
November 22	at No. 6 Iowa	No. 15	Iowa Stadium; Iowa City, IA	L 21–31	58,230	
November 29	at USC	No. 18	Los Angeles Memorial Coliseum; Los Angeles, CA (rivalry)	W 20–13	66,903	
Rankings from AP Poll released prior to the game; Source:

== Personnel ==
1958 Notre Dame Fighting Irish football team roster
Players
Coaches
Offense

Pos.	#	Name	Class
QB		George Izo	Jr
QB		Bob Williams

Defense

Pos.	#	Name	Class

Special teams

Pos.	#	Name	Class

Head coach

- Terry Brennan

Coordinators/assistant coaches

Legend

- (C) Team captain
- (S) Suspended
- (I) Ineligible
- Injured
- Redshirt

== Game summaries ==
=== Indiana ===
Team	1	2	3	4	Total
Indiana	0	0	0	0	0
• Notre Dame	0	6	0	12	18

- Date: September 27
- Location: Notre Dame Stadium
- Game attendance: 49,347

Scoring summary
Q2	ND	Mack 11 yard run (run failed)	ND 6–0
Q4	ND	Williams 20 yard run (kick failed)	ND 12–0
Q4	ND	Stickles 4 yard pass from Williams (pass failed)	ND 18–0
