= 1958 Rochester Yellowjackets football team =

American college football season

1958 Rochester Yellowjackets football
- Conference: Independent
- Record: 8–0
- Head coach: Elmer Burnham (15th season)
- Captain: Larry Palvino
- Home stadium: Fauver Stadium

1958 Eastern non-major college football independents records
	Conf.			Overall
Team	W	L	T	W		L		T
Rochester		–		8	–	0	–	0
Hamilton		–		6	–	0	–	1
No. 10 Buffalo		–		8	–	1	–	0
Southern Connecticut State		–		7	–	2	–	0
Carnegie Tech		–		6	–	2	–	0
Northeastern		–		6	–	2	–	0
Hofstra		–		6	–	4	–	0
Rankings from UPI small college poll

The 1958 Rochester Yellowjackets football team was an American football team that represented the University of Rochester as an independent during the 1958 college football season. In their 15th year under head coach Elmer Burnham, the Yellowjackets compiled a perfect 8–0 record, shut out the first five opponents, and outscored all opponents by a total of 257 to 19. It was the second undefeated season in Rochester football history.

The team played its home games at Fauver Stadium in Rochester, New York.

== Schedule ==
Date	Opponent	Site	Result	Attendance	Source
September 27	Allegheny	Fauver Stadium; Rochester, NY	W 20–0		
October 4	at Hobart	Geneva, NY	W 24–0		
October 11	Union	Fauver Stadium; Rochester, NY	W 47–0		
October 18	Vermont	Fauver Stadium; Rochester, NY	W 46–0	5,300	
October 25	at Merchant Marine	Tomb Memorial Field; Kings Point, NY	W 20–0		
November 1	at DePauw	Blackstock Stadium; Greencastle, IN	W 20–6	3,000	
November 8	Tufts	Fauver Stadium; Rochester, NY	W 46–6	> 7,000	
November 15	at RPI	Troy, NY	W 34–7		
