= 1958 Chattanooga Moccasins football team =

American college football season

1958 Chattanooga Moccasins football
- Conference: Independent
- Record: 5–5
- Head coach: Scrappy Moore (28th season)
- Captain: Hinman Rizer
- Home stadium: Chamberlain Field

1958 Southern non-major college football independents records
| | Conf. | | | Overall |
| Team | W | L | T | W | | L | | T |
|---|---|---|---|---|---|---|---|---|
| No. 1 Mississippi Southern | | – | | 9 | – | 0 | – | 0 |
| Sewanee | | – | | 8 | – | 0 | – | 0 |
| Trinity (TX) | | – | | 6 | – | 3 | – | 0 |
| Tampa | | – | | 6 | – | 4 | – | 0 |
| Abilene Christian | | – | | 5 | – | 5 | – | 0 |
| No. 8 Chattanooga | | – | | 5 | – | 5 | – | 0 |
| Louisville | | – | | 4 | – | 4 | – | 0 |
| Arkansas State | | – | | 4 | – | 5 | – | 0 |
| No. 18 Memphis State | | – | | 4 | – | 5 | – | 0 |
| Howard (AL) | | – | | 1 | – | 5 | – | 1 |
| Washington and Lee | | – | | 1 | – | 7 | – | 0 |
Rankings from UPI small college poll

The 1958 Chattanooga Moccasins football team was an American football team that represented the University of Chattanooga (now known as the University of Tennessee at Chattanooga) during the 1958 college football season. In their 28th year under head coach Scrappy Moore, the team compiled a 5–5 record. Notably, Moore's 1958 outfit defeated the Tennessee Volunteers at Neyland Stadium. This was the first victory for UTC over the Vols since 1905, and only their second victory in the series overall.

== Schedule ==
| Date | Opponent | Rank | Site | Result | Attendance | Source |
|---|---|---|---|---|---|---|
| September 19 | Jacksonville State | | Chamberlain Field; Chattanooga, TN | W 55–0 | | |
| September 26 | Abilene Christian | No. 4 | Chamberlain Field; Chattanooga, TN | W 22–12 | | |
| October 4 | at No. 2 (major) Auburn | No. 4 | Cliff Hare Stadium; Auburn, AL | L 8–30 | 20,000 | |
| October 10 | Austin Peay | No. 5 | Chamberlain Field; Chattanooga, TN | W 26–0 | | |
| October 17 | No. 11 Middle Tennessee^{†} | No. 3 | Chamberlain Field; Chattanooga, TN | W 18–6 | 10,000 | |
| October 25 | at Memphis State | No. 4 | Crump Stadium; Memphis, TN | L 7–22 | 6,474–7,474 | |
| November 1 | at Tennessee Tech | No. 8 | Overall Field; Cookeville, TN | L 12–13 | 4,000 | |
| November 8 | at Tennessee | No. 11 | Shields–Watkins Field; Knoxville, TN | W 14–6 | | |
| November 15 | at Tampa | No. 3 | Phillips Field; Tampa, FL | L 19–25 | 6,000 | |
| November 27 | No. 1 Mississippi Southern | No. 7 | Chamberlain Field; Chattanooga, TN | L 13–20 | 9,500 | |
^{†}Homecoming; Rankings from UPI Poll released prior to the game
