= 1958 Dayton Flyers football team =

American college football season

1958 Dayton Flyers football
- Conference: Independent
- Record: 2–8
- Head coach: Bud Kerr (3rd season)
- Home stadium: UD Stadium

1958 Midwestern major college football independents records
| | Conf. | | | Overall |
| Team | W | L | T | W | | L | | T |
|---|---|---|---|---|---|---|---|---|
| No. 17 Notre Dame | | – | | 6 | – | 4 | – | 0 |
| Detroit | | – | | 4 | – | 4 | – | 1 |
| Marquette | | – | | 2 | – | 7 | – | 1 |
| Drake | | – | | 2 | – | 7 | – | 0 |
| Dayton | | – | | 2 | – | 8 | – | 0 |
Rankings from AP poll

The 1958 Dayton Flyers football team represented the University of Dayton as an independent during the 1958 college football season. In their third season under head coach Bud Kerr, the Flyers compiled a 2–8 record. Dayton played their home games at UD Stadium in Dayton, Ohio.

== Schedule ==
| Date | Time | Opponent | Site | Result | Attendance | Source |
|---|---|---|---|---|---|---|
| September 20 | | at Cincinnati | Nippert Stadium; Cincinnati, OH | L 0–14 | 12,000 | |
| September 27 | | Richmond | UD Stadium; Dayton, OH | W 13–12 | | |
| October 4 | | No. T–15 Bowling Green | UD Stadium; Dayton, OH | L 0–25 | 7,196 | |
| October 11 | | No. 11 Ohio^{†} | UD Stadium; Dayton, OH | L 8–27 | 8,917 | |
| October 18 | | Louisville | UD Stadium; Dayton, OH | W 26–13 | | |
| October 25 | 8:00 p.m. | at Xavier | Xavier Stadium; Cincinnati, OH | L 0–16 | 6,500 | |
| November 1 | | at Holy Cross | Fitton Field; Worcester, MA | L 0–26 | 12,000 | |
| November 8 | | Villanova | UD Stadium; Dayton, OH | L 6–9 | | |
| November 15 | | at No. 2 Miami (OH) | Miami Field; Oxford, OH | L 0–34 | 6,400 | |
| November 22 | | at Detroit | University of Detroit Stadium; Detroit, MI | L 7–27 | 12,850 | |
^{†}Homecoming; Rankings from UPI Poll released prior to the game; All times are in Eastern time; Source:
