= 1958 Memphis State Tigers football team =

American college football season

1958 Memphis State Tigers football
- Conference: Independent
- Record: 4–5
- Head coach: Billy J. Murphy (1st season)
- Home stadium: Crump Stadium

1958 Southern non-major college football independents records
	Conf.			Overall
Team	W	L	T	W		L		T
No. 1 Mississippi Southern		–		9	–	0	–	0
Sewanee		–		8	–	0	–	0
Trinity (TX)		–		6	–	3	–	0
Tampa		–		6	–	4	–	0
Abilene Christian		–		5	–	5	–	0
No. 8 Chattanooga		–		5	–	5	–	0
Louisville		–		4	–	4	–	0
Arkansas State		–		4	–	5	–	0
No. 18 Memphis State		–		4	–	5	–	0
Howard (AL)		–		1	–	5	–	1
Washington and Lee		–		1	–	7	–	0
Rankings from UPI small college poll

The 1958 Memphis State Tigers football team was an American football team that represented Memphis State College (now known as the University of Memphis) as an independent during the 1958 college football season. In their first season under head coach Billy J. Murphy, Memphis State compiled a 4–5 record.

== Schedule ==
Date	Opponent	Rank	Site	Result	Attendance	Source
September 20	No. 6 (major) Ole Miss		Crump Stadium; Memphis, TN (rivalry)	L 0–17	11,392	
September 27	at Tennessee Tech		Overall Field; Cookeville, TN	W 13–0		
October 4	at No. 1 Mississippi Southern	No. T–15	Faulkner Field; Hattiesburg, MS (rivalry)	L 22–24	11,000	
October 11	at Mississippi State	No. T–20	Scott Field; Starkville, MS	L 6–28	12,000	
October 18	The Citadel		Crump Stadium; Memphis, TN	L 26–28	8,408	
October 25	No. 4 Chattanooga		Crump Stadium; Memphis, TN	W 22–7	6,474–7,474	
November 1	Louisiana Tech	No. 12	Crump Stadium; Memphis, TN	W 26–12	3,300	
November 8	Louisiana College	No. T–14	Crump Stadium; Memphis, TN	W 27–14	5,600	
November 22	at Alabama	No. T–19	Denny Stadium; Tuscaloosa, AL	L 0–14	26,500	
Rankings from UPI Poll released prior to the game
