= 1958 Louisville Cardinals football team =

American college football season

1958 Louisville Cardinals football
- Conference: Independent
- Record: 4–4
- Head coach: Frank Camp (13th season)
- Home stadium: Fairgrounds Stadium

1958 Southern non-major college football independents records
	Conf.			Overall
Team	W	L	T	W		L		T
No. 1 Mississippi Southern		–		9	–	0	–	0
Sewanee		–		8	–	0	–	0
Trinity (TX)		–		6	–	3	–	0
Tampa		–		6	–	4	–	0
Abilene Christian		–		5	–	5	–	0
No. 8 Chattanooga		–		5	–	5	–	0
Louisville		–		4	–	4	–	0
Arkansas State		–		4	–	5	–	0
No. 18 Memphis State		–		4	–	5	–	0
Howard (AL)		–		1	–	5	–	1
Washington and Lee		–		1	–	7	–	0
Rankings from UPI small college poll

The 1958 Louisville Cardinals football team was an American football team that represented the University of Louisville as an independent during the 1958 college football season. In their 13th season under head coach Frank Camp, the Cardinals compiled a 4–4 record.

The team's statistical leaders included Ken Porco with 581 rushing yards and Dale Orem with 385 passing yards.

== Schedule ==
Date	Opponent	Rank	Site	Result	Attendance	Source
September 27	Eastern Kentucky		Fairgrounds Stadium; Louisville, KY	W 20–7	6,727	
October 4	at Toledo	No. T–20	Glass Bowl; Toledo, OH	L 7–13	8,000	
October 11	Murray State		Fairgrounds Stadium; Louisville, KY	W 27–0	5,396	
October 18	at Dayton		UD Stadium; Dayton, OH	L 13–26		
October 25	at No. 8 Central Michigan		Alumni Field; Mount Pleasant, MI	W 40–7	9,500	
November 8	No. 12 Kent State		Fairgrounds Stadium; Louisville, KY	W 21–0	5,000	
November 15	at Ohio		Peden Stadium; Athens, OH	L 6–23	7,500	
November 22	North Texas State		Fairgrounds Stadium; Louisville, KY	L 10–21	3,000	
Rankings from UPI Poll released prior to the game
