= 1958 Ohio Bobcats football team =

American college football season

1958 Ohio Bobcats football
- Conference: Mid-American Conference
- Record: 5–4 (2–4 MAC)
- Head coach: Bill Hess (1st season)
- Home stadium: Peden Stadium

1958 Mid-American Conference football standings
	Conf.					Overall
Team	W		L		T	W		L		T
No. 2 Miami (OH) $	5	–	0	–	0	6	–	3	–	0
Kent State	5	–	1	–	0	7	–	2	–	0
No. 14 Bowling Green	4	–	2	–	0	7	–	2	–	0
Ohio	2	–	4	–	0	5	–	4	–	0
Western Michigan	2	–	4	–	0	4	–	5	–	0
Toledo	1	–	4	–	0	4	–	5	–	0
Marshall	1	–	5	–	0	3	–	6	–	0
$ – Conference champion; Rankings from UPI small college poll

The 1958 Ohio Bobcats football team was an American football team that represented Ohio University in the Mid-American Conference (MAC) during the 1958 college football season. In their first season under head coach Bill Hess, the Bobcats compiled a 5–4 record (2–4 against MAC opponents), finished in a tie for fourth place in the MAC, and outscored all opponents by a combined total of 159 to 102. They played their home games in Peden Stadium in Athens, Ohio.

== Schedule ==
Date	Opponent	Rank	Site	Result	Attendance	Source
September 20	Youngstown State*		Peden Stadium; Athens, OH	W 38–0	7,500	
September 27	Toledo	No. 5	Peden Stadium; Athens, OH	W 13–6	7,500	
October 4	at No. 14 Kent State	No. 2	Memorial Stadium; Kent, OH	L 6–14	9,500	
October 11	at Dayton*	No. 11	UD Stadium; Dayton, OH	W 27–8	8,917	
October 18	No. 6 Miami (OH)	No. 13	Peden Stadium; Athens, OH (rivalry)	L 10–14	10,882	
October 25	Marshall		Peden Stadium; Athens, OH (rivalry)	W 22–0	4,000	
November 1	at Western Michigan		Waldo Stadium; Kalamazoo, MI	L 14–21	6,000	
November 8	at No. 16 Bowling Green		University Stadium; Bowling Green, OH	L 6–33	6,000	
November 15	Louisville*		Peden Stadium; Athens, OH	W 23–6	7,500	
*Non-conference game; Rankings from UPI Poll released prior to the game
