= 1958 Bowling Green Falcons football team =

American college football season

1958 Bowling Green Falcons football
- Conference: Mid-American Conference
- Record: 7–2 (4–2 MAC)
- Head coach: Doyt Perry (4th season)
- MVP: Harold Furcron
- Captain: Ray Reese
- Home stadium: University Stadium

1958 Mid-American Conference football standings
	Conf.					Overall
Team	W		L		T	W		L		T
No. 2 Miami (OH) $	5	–	0	–	0	6	–	3	–	0
Kent State	5	–	1	–	0	7	–	2	–	0
No. 14 Bowling Green	4	–	2	–	0	7	–	2	–	0
Ohio	2	–	4	–	0	5	–	4	–	0
Western Michigan	2	–	4	–	0	4	–	5	–	0
Toledo	1	–	4	–	0	4	–	5	–	0
Marshall	1	–	5	–	0	3	–	6	–	0
$ – Conference champion; Rankings from UPI small college poll

The 1958 Bowling Green Falcons football team was an American football team that represented Bowling Green State University in the Mid-American Conference (MAC) during the 1958 college football season. In their fourth season under head coach Doyt Perry, the Falcons compiled a 7–2 record (4–2 against MAC opponents), finished in third place in the MAC, and outscored all opponents by a combined total of 218 to 91.

On November 8, the Falcons defeated Ohio, 33–6, starting an 18-game winning streak that continued until November 12, 1960. The streak remains the longest in Bowling Green history.

The team's statistical leaders were Bob Colburn with 685 passing yards, Bob Ramlow with 779 rushing yards, and Bernie Casey with 310 receiving yards. Ray Reese was the team captain. Harold Furcron received the team's Most Valuable Player award. Furcron set a Bowling Green record, since broken, with an 81-yard run against Dayton. Jerry Dianiska also had an 80-yard run against Ohio.

== Schedule ==
Date	Opponent	Rank	Site	Result	Attendance	Source
September 20	at Wichita*		University Stadium; Bowling Green, OH	W 20–14	10,107	
September 27	Lockbourne AFB*	No. 12	University Stadium; Bowling Green, OH	W 27–6	6,237	
October 4	at Dayton*	No. T–15	UD Stadium; Dayton, OH	W 25–0	7,196	
October 11	at Western Michigan	No. 7	Waldo Stadium; Kalamazoo, MI	W 40–6	5,500–6,500	
October 18	at Toledo	No. 5	Glass Bowl; Toledo, OH (rivalry)	W 31–16	9–500–10,500	
October 25	Kent State	No. 3	University Stadium; Bowling Green, OH (rivalry)	L 7–8	10,800	
November 1	at No. 3 Miami (OH)	No. 6	Miami Field; Oxford, OH	L 14–28	11,000	
November 8	Ohio	No. 16	University Stadium; Bowling Green, OH	W 33–6	6,000	
November 15	Marshall	No. 12	University Stadium; Bowling Green, OH	W 21–7	2,100	
*Non-conference game; Rankings from UPI Poll released prior to the game
