= 1958 Kent State Golden Flashes football team =

American college football season

1958 Kent State Golden Flashes football
- Conference: Mid-American Conference
- Record: 7–2 (5–1 MAC)
- Head coach: Trevor J. Rees (13th season)
- Home stadium: Memorial Stadium

1958 Mid-American Conference football standings
	Conf.					Overall
Team	W		L		T	W		L		T
No. 2 Miami (OH) $	5	–	0	–	0	6	–	3	–	0
Kent State	5	–	1	–	0	7	–	2	–	0
No. 14 Bowling Green	4	–	2	–	0	7	–	2	–	0
Ohio	2	–	4	–	0	5	–	4	–	0
Western Michigan	2	–	4	–	0	4	–	5	–	0
Toledo	1	–	4	–	0	4	–	5	–	0
Marshall	1	–	5	–	0	3	–	6	–	0
$ – Conference champion; Rankings from UPI small college poll

The 1958 Kent State Golden Flashes football team was an American football team that represented Kent State University in the Mid-American Conference (MAC) during the 1958 college football season. In their 13th season under head coach Trevor J. Rees, the Golden Flashes compiled a 7–2 record (5–1 against MAC opponents), finished in a tie for second place in the MAC, and outscored all opponents by a combined total of 137 to 95.

The team's statistical leaders included John Martin with 386 rushing yards, quarterback Dick Mostardo with 542 passing yards, and Dick Mihalus with 231 receiving yards. Mostardo was selected as a first-team All-MAC player.

== Schedule ==
Date	Opponent	Rank	Site	Result	Attendance	Source
September 20	at Xavier*		Xavier Stadium; Cincinnati, OH	W 6–0		
September 27	at Baldwin–Wallace*		Berea, OH	W 21–14		
October 4	No. 2 Ohio	No. 14	Memorial Stadium; Kent, OH	W 14–6	9,500	
October 11	at No. T–13 Miami (OH)	No. 6	Miami Field; Oxford, OH	L 0–35	9,000	
October 18	Marshall	No. T–20	Memorial Stadium; Kent, OH	W 24–0	6,000	
October 25	at No. 3 Bowling Green		University Stadium; Bowling Green, OH (rivalry)	W 8–7	10,800	
November 1	Toledo	No. 19	Memorial Stadium; Kent, OH	W 32–0	8,000	
November 8	at Louisville*	No. 12	Fairgrounds Stadium; Louisville, KY	L 0–21	5,000	
November 15	Western Michigan		Memorial Stadium; Kent, OH	W 32–6	2,500	
*Non-conference game; Rankings from UPI Poll released prior to the game
