= Carl Herakovich =

- Herakovich, 1963

Biographical details
- Born: August 6, 1937 (age 89); East Chicago, Indiana, U.S.
- Education: University of Kansas; Illinois Institute of Technology

Playing career
- 1955–1958: Rose Poly
- Position: Halfback

Coaching career (HC unless noted)
- 1962–1963: Rose Poly

Head coaching record
- Overall: 3–13

Accomplishments and honors

Awards
- Little All–American (1958)

Carl Thomas "Rocky" Herakovich (born August 6, 1937) is an American retired engineering professor, college football player, coach and official. He served as the head football coach at Rose Polytechnic Institute—now known as Rose-Hulman Institute of Technology—from 1962 to 1963, compiling a record of 3–13. Herakovich was the founding director of the NASA-Virginia Tech Composites Program at Virginia Tech and Director of Applied Mechanics and the Henry L Kinnier Professor of civil engineering at the University of Virginia.

Herakovich played football at Rose Poly as a halfback. He led the nation in scoring in 1958 with 168 points in eight games. The 168 points was the most scored by a college football player in a season since 1926, when Mayes McLain tallied 253 points for Haskell. Herakovich graduated from Rose Poly in 1959. He was a graduate student, research assistant, and assistant instructor in the engineering mechanics department at the University of Kansas when he was hired, in 1962, as head football coach at his alma mater, succeeding Max Kidd.

== Head coaching record ==
Year	Team	Overall	Conference	Standing	Bowl/playoffs
Rose Poly Engineers (Prairie College Conference) (1962–1963)
1962	Rose Poly	1–7	0–2	3rd	
1963	Rose Poly	2–6	0–2	3rd	
Rose Poly:		3–13	0–4		
Total:		3–13			
