= 1958 Detroit Titans football team =

American college football season

1958 Detroit Titans football
- Conference: Independent
- Record: 4–4–1
- Head coach: Wally Fromhart (5th season)
- Home stadium: University of Detroit Stadium

1958 Midwestern major college football independents records
	Conf.			Overall
Team	W	L	T	W		L		T
No. 17 Notre Dame		–		6	–	4	–	0
Detroit		–		4	–	4	–	1
Marquette		–		2	–	7	–	1
Drake		–		2	–	7	–	0
Dayton		–		2	–	8	–	0
Rankings from AP poll

The 1958 Detroit Titans football team represented the University of Detroit as an independent during the 1958 college football season. In their fifth and final year under head coach Wally Fromhart, the Titans compiled a 4–4–1 record and were outscored by a combined total of 157 to 131.

The team's statistical leaders included Lou Faoro with 584 passing yards and Bruce Maher with 576 rushing yards, 295 receiving yards, and 42 points scored.

== Schedule ==
Date	Time	Opponent	Site	Result	Attendance	Source
September 19		George Washington	University of Detroit Stadium; Detroit, MI	W 21–6	19,271	
September 26		Air Force	University of Detroit Stadium; Detroit, MI	L 6–37	20,015	
October 3		Quantico Marines	University of Detroit Stadium; Detroit, MI	W 26–13	19,107	
October 11		at Villanova	Villanova Stadium; Villanova, PA	L 0–7	7,695–7,965	
October 18	2:00 p.m.	at Xavier	Xavier Stadium; Cincinnati, OH	W 31–6	9,000–10,000	
October 25		Arizona State	University of Detroit Stadium; Detroit, MI	L 6–27	14,715	
November 1		Marquette	University of Detroit Stadium; Detroit, MI	T 14–14	11,635	
November 8		at Boston College	Alumni Stadium; Chestnut Hill, MA	L 0–40	18,000	
November 22		Dayton	University of Detroit Stadium; Detroit, MI	W 27–7	12,850	
All times are in Eastern time
