= Peter Hall (American football) =

Profile
- Position: Quarterback

Personal information
- Born: c. 1939; Farrell, Pennsylvania, U.S.
- Listed height: 6 ft 3 in (1.91 m)
- Listed weight: 195 lb (88 kg)

Career information
- High school: Farrell (PA)
- College: Marquette (1958–1959)

Peter Hall (born c. 1939) is a former American football quarterback. He played college football for the Marquette Warriors in 1958 and 1959. He also played on defense and played all 60 minutes against Boston College in 1958. In 1959, he ranked among the leading quarterbacks in major-college football with 330 total plays (1st), 1,589 passing yards (2nd), 158.9 yards gained per game played (2nd), 237 pass attempts (second), 120 pass completions (3rd), 14 passing interceptions (3rd), seven passing touchdowns (7th), and 50.6% completion (9th). He also played basketball at Marquette.
