= 1958 college football season =

American college football season

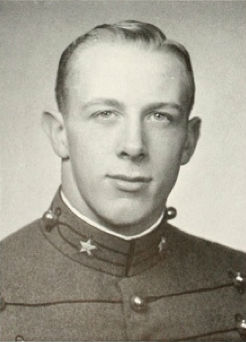
- Heisman Trophy winner Pete Dawkins
- Preseason AP No. 1: Ohio State Buckeyes
- Regular season: September 13 – November 29, 1958
- Number of bowls: 8
- Bowl games: December 13, 1958 – January 1, 1959
- Champion(s): LSU (AP, Coaches); Iowa (FWAA)
- Heisman: Pete Dawkins, (halfback, Army)

The 1958 college football season was the 90th season of intercollegiate football in the United States and concluded with two teams claiming the national championship:

- LSU compiled an 11–0 record, defeated Clemson in the Sugar Bowl, and were ranked No. 1 in the final Associated Press (AP) writers and United Press International (UPI) coaches polls. LSU received 139 first-place votes in the AP poll and 29 of 35 first-place votes in the UPI poll. LSU was also selected as the national champion by 14 of 15 other NCAA-designated "major selectors", including: Billingsley Report, College Football Researchers Association, Helms Athletic Foundation, and National Championship Foundation. LSU halfback Billy Cannon finished third in voting for the Heisman Trophy. LSU was the only team in the country to finish the season undefeated and not have a game end in a tie.
- Iowa compiled an 8–1–1 record and were selected as the national champion by the Football Writers Association of America, winning the Grantland Rice Award. Iowa quarterback Randy Duncan finished second in voting for the Heisman Trophy.

The national championship is also claimed by:

- Auburn compiled an 9-0-1 record, undefeated in SEC and regular season play. Auburn recognized the 1958 team as national champions in 2025, based on the "Montgomery Full Season Championship" rankings.

Three small college teams also claimed national championships:

- Mississippi Southern compiled a 9–0 record and was ranked No. 1 in the UPI small college coaches poll.
- Prairie View compiled a 10–0–1 record, defeated Florida A&M in the Orange Blossom Classic, and was selected as the black college national champion.
- Northeastern State compiled an 11–0 record, defeated Arizona State–Flagstaff in the Holiday Bowl, and won the NAIA championship.

Army halfback Pete Dawkins won the Heisman Trophy and the Maxwell Award as the best player in college football. Pacific fullback Dick Bass led all major college football players with 1,448 yards of total offense, 1,361 rushing yards, and 116 points scored.

On January 13, 1958, the eleven-man NCAA Rules Committee unanimously approved a resolution to allow teams to choose between kicking an extra point after a touchdown, or running or passing from the three-yard line for a two-point conversion. University of Michigan athletic director Fritz Crisler said at the meeting in Fort Lauderdale, "It's a progressive step which will make football more interesting for the spectators," adding that the rule "will add drama to what has been the dullest, most stupid play in the game."

== Conference and program changes ==
=== Conference changes ===
- Two conferences began play in 1958:
  - Middle Atlantic Conference – an active NCAA Division III conference
  - Western Pennsylvania Conference – active through the 1967 season
- One conference played their final season in 1958:
  - Virginia Little Eight Conference – active since the 1949 season; previously known the Virginia Little Six (1949–1953) and Virginia Little Seven (1954–1955)

=== Membership changes ===
School	1957 Conference	1958 Conference
Washington and Lee Generals	Southern	Independent

== Season chronology ==
=== September ===
In the preseason poll released on September 15, 1958, the Buckeyes of Ohio State University were the first place choice for 46 of 99 writers casting votes, followed by Oklahoma, Notre Dame, Michigan State and 1957's champion, Auburn. As the regular season progressed, a new poll would be issued on the Monday following the weekend's games.

Most teams did not begin play until September 27. On September 13, Kentucky beat Hawaii 51–0 in a game in Louisville, and attempted the 2-point conversion, but without success. One of the first successful 2-point conversions in an NCAA game happened when Iowa State Teachers College hosted Bradley University at Cedar Falls, Iowa on September 13. Max Huffman carried the ball over twice on conversion attempts to give the Panthers of Iowa Teachers a 29–12 win over the Braves. On September 20, No. 6 Mississippi and No. 8 Texas Christian were among the winners, beating Memphis State (17–0) and Kansas (42–0) respectively, but the Top Five schools had not yet started play. The poll for the five 0–0 teams was No. 1 Ohio State, No. 2. Oklahoma, No. 3 Auburn, No. 4 Michigan State, and No. 5 Notre Dame.

September 27 No. 1 Ohio State narrowly beat No. 20 SMU at home, 23–20, and fell to third in the next poll. No. 2 Oklahoma, on the other hand, rolled over visiting No. 13 West Virginia 47–14, and rose to first place. No. 3 Auburn beat Tennessee in Birmingham, 13–0, and No. 4 Michigan State beat California 32–12. No. 5 Notre Dame beat Indiana 18–0, but fell to 7th, while No. 8 Army, which beat South Carolina 45–8, took the place of the Irish. The next poll: No. 1 Oklahoma, No. 2 Auburn, No. 3 Ohio State, No. 4 Michigan State, and No. 5 Army.

=== October ===
October 4 No. 1 Oklahoma got past visiting Oregon, 6–0, and dropped to second. No. 2 Auburn, which beat UT-Chattanooga 30–8 at home, moved up to the top spot. No. 3 Ohio State beat Washington at home, 12–7. No. 4 Michigan State played No. 16 Michigan to a 12–12 tie, and fell to 9th. No. 5 Army beat Penn State 26–0. No. 7 Notre Dame, which beat No. 17 SMU in Dallas, 14–6, returned to the Top Five. The next poll: No. 1 Auburn, No. 2 Oklahoma, No. 3 Army, No. 4 Notre Dame, and No. 5 Ohio State.

October 11 No. 1 Auburn won at Kentucky, 8–0. No. 2 Oklahoma sustained a 15–14 loss at Dallas in their annual meeting with the No. 16 Texas Longhorns. In South Bend, Indiana, the visiting No. 3 Army Cadets beat No. 4 Notre Dame, 14–2, and were voted No. 1 in the next poll. No. 5 Ohio State won at Illinois, 19–13. No. 6 Wisconsin, which beat Purdue 31–6, and No. 9 Michigan State, which beat No. 10 Pittsburgh 22–8, rose in the polls, to put three Big Ten schools in the top five. The next poll: No. 1 Army, No. 2 Auburn, No. 3 Ohio State, No. 4 Wisconsin, and No. 5 Michigan State.

On October 18 at West Point, New York, No. 1 Army beat Virginia 35–6. No. 2 Auburn tied with Georgia Tech 7–7 in Atlanta and fell in the polls. No. 3 Ohio State beat Indiana 49–8. No. 4 Wisconsin lost to No. 13 Iowa at home, 20–9, and No. 5 Michigan State began a five-game losing streak with a 14–6 defeat at Purdue. The Spartans would finish the season with a 3–5–1 record after starting 2–0–1. No. 7 Texas (24–6 over Arkansas) and No. 9 LSU (32–7 over Kentucky) rose in the polls. The next poll: No. 1 Army, No. 2 Ohio State, No. 3 LSU, No. 4 Texas, and No. 5 Auburn.

October 25 For the top-ranked teams, a tie was only slightly better than a loss. No. 1 Army played to a 14–14 tie against the Panthers at Pittsburgh, and No. 2 Ohio State tied with Wisconsin at home 7–7. No. 3 LSU beat Florida 10–7, and the win was enough to propel the Tigers to first place. No. 4 Texas lost to the Rice Owls in Houston, 34–7. No. 5 Auburn beat Maryland at home, 20–7. No. 7 Iowa, which beat Northwestern 26–20, rose to 2nd in the next poll: No. 1 LSU, No. 2 Iowa, No. 3 Army, No. 4 Auburn, and No. 5 Ohio State.

=== November ===
November 1 No. 1 LSU beat No. 6 Ole Miss 14–0. No. 2 Iowa won at Michigan, 37–14. No. 3 Army crushed Colgate, 68–6. No. 4 Auburn won 6–5 at Florida. In Columbus, No. 5 Ohio State was upset by visiting No. 11 Northwestern, 21–0. The next poll was: No. 1 LSU, No. 2 Iowa, No. 3 Army, No. 4 Northwestern, and No. 5 Auburn.

November 8 No. 1 LSU beat Duke 50–18. No. 2 Iowa won at Minnesota 28–6. No. 3 Army beat the No. 13 Rice Owls in Houston, 14–7. No. 4 Northwestern lost at Madison to No. 7 Wisconsin, 17–13. No. 5 Auburn beat Mississippi State 33–14 at home. The next poll was: No. 1 LSU, No. 2 Iowa, No. 3 Army, No. 4 Auburn, and No. 5 Wisconsin.

November 15 No. 1 LSU beat Mississippi State at Jackson 7–6. No. 2 Iowa lost at home to No. 16 Ohio State 38–28. No. 3 Army beat Villanova 26–0. No. 4 Auburn met the Georgia Bulldogs halfway in Columbus, Georgia, and won 21–6. No. 5 Wisconsin won 31–12 at Illinois. No. 6 Oklahoma, which beat Missouri 39–0, rose to 4th. The next poll was: No. 1 LSU, No. 2 Auburn, No. 3 Army, No. 4 Oklahoma, and No. 5 Wisconsin.

November 22 In New Orleans, the No. 1 LSU Tigers crushed Tulane 62–0, scoring 56 points in the second half, to close their season 10–0–0. They would face the Clemson Tigers in the Sugar Bowl. Behind them were the No. 2 Auburn Tigers, who beat Wake Forest at home 21–7. No. 3 Army was idle as it prepared for the annual Army-Navy game. No. 4 Oklahoma crushed Nebraska 40–7. No. 5 Wisconsin beat Minnesota to close its season at 7–1–1. No. 6 Iowa, which beat No. 15 Notre Dame 31–21, returned to the Top Five: No. 1 LSU, No. 2 Auburn, No. 3 Oklahoma, No. 4 Iowa, and No. 5 Army.

On November 29 No. 2 Auburn defeated Alabama 14–8 in Birmingham to finish its season at 9–0–1, but they were on probation for recruiting violations and ineligible for a bowl game. No. 3 Oklahoma won at Oklahoma State 7–0. The Sooners (who had not lost a conference game since 1946) won the Big 7 title and headed to the Orange Bowl. In Philadelphia, No. 5 Army beat Navy, 22–6, to finish its season 8–0–1.

The final AP Poll was released on December 1, and the No. 1 LSU Tigers, at 10–0–0, won the AP Trophy with 130 of the first place votes. The other 73 votes were spread among 12 schools, including No. 2 Iowa (17), No. 3 Army (13), No. 4 Auburn (9), No. 5 Oklahoma (10), No. 6 Air Force (2), No. 7 Wisconsin (13), No. 8 Ohio State (3), and No. 9 Syracuse (1). LSU finished the 1958 season as the only undefeated and untied team in college football. Army, Air Force, and Auburn were also undefeated but they each had one game that ended in a tie. The United States Air Force Academy football team, nicknamed the Falcons, had a 9–0–1 record in only their second year of playing college football, and accepted a bid to face No. 10 Texas Christian in the Cotton Bowl. Oklahoma was the only team to beat a top 10 team in all of the bowl games when they defeated number 9 Syracuse in the Orange Bowl.

== Conference standings ==
=== Major conference standings ===
1958 Atlantic Coast Conference football standings
	Conf.					Overall
Team	W		L		T	W		L		T
No. 12 Clemson $	5	–	1	–	0	8	–	3	–	0
No. 15 South Carolina	5	–	2	–	0	7	–	3	–	0
Duke	3	–	2	–	0	5	–	5	–	0
North Carolina	4	–	3	–	0	6	–	4	–	0
Maryland	3	–	3	–	0	4	–	6	–	0
Wake Forest	2	–	4	–	0	3	–	7	–	0
NC State	2	–	5	–	0	2	–	7	–	1
Virginia	1	–	5	–	0	1	–	9	–	0
$ – Conference champion; Rankings from AP poll

1958 Big Seven Conference football standings
	Conf.					Overall
Team	W		L		T	W		L		T
No. 5 Oklahoma $	6	–	0	–	0	10	–	1	–	0
Missouri	4	–	1	–	1	5	–	4	–	1
Colorado	4	–	2	–	0	6	–	4	–	0
Kansas	3	–	2	–	1	4	–	5	–	1
Kansas State	2	–	4	–	0	3	–	7	–	0
Nebraska	1	–	5	–	0	3	–	7	–	0
Iowa State	0	–	6	–	0	4	–	6	–	0
$ – Conference champion; Rankings from AP Poll

1958 Big Ten Conference football standings
	Conf.					Overall
Team	W		L		T	W		L		T
No. 2 Iowa $	5	–	1	–	0	8	–	1	–	1
No. 7 Wisconsin	5	–	1	–	1	7	–	1	–	1
No. 8 Ohio State	4	–	1	–	2	6	–	1	–	2
No. 13 Purdue	3	–	1	–	2	6	–	1	–	2
Indiana	3	–	2	–	1	5	–	3	–	1
Illinois	4	–	3	–	0	4	–	5	–	0
Northwestern	3	–	4	–	0	5	–	4	–	0
Michigan	1	–	5	–	1	2	–	6	–	1
Minnesota	1	–	6	–	0	1	–	8	–	0
Michigan State	0	–	5	–	1	3	–	5	–	1
$ – Conference champion; Rankings from AP Poll

1958 Border Conference football standings
	Conf.					Overall
Team	W		L		T	W		L		T
Hardin–Simmons $	4	–	0	–	0	6	–	5	–	0
Arizona State	4	–	1	–	0	7	–	3	–	0
Arizona	2	–	1	–	0	3	–	7	–	0
New Mexico A&M	1	–	3	–	0	4	–	6	–	0
Texas Western	1	–	4	–	0	2	–	7	–	0
West Texas State	1	–	4	–	0	1	–	9	–	0
$ – Conference champion

1958 Ivy League football standings
	Conf.					Overall
Team	W		L		T	W		L		T
Dartmouth $	6	–	1	–	0	7	–	2	–	0
Cornell	5	–	2	–	0	6	–	3	–	0
Princeton	5	–	2	–	0	6	–	3	–	0
Brown	4	–	3	–	0	6	–	3	–	0
Penn	4	–	3	–	0	4	–	5	–	0
Harvard	3	–	4	–	0	4	–	5	–	0
Columbia	1	–	6	–	0	1	–	8	–	0
Yale	0	–	7	–	0	2	–	7	–	0
$ – Conference champion

1958 Missouri Valley Conference football standings
	Conf.					Overall
Team	W		L		T	W		L		T
North Texas State $	2	–	1	–	1	7	–	2	–	1
Cincinnati	1	–	1	–	2	6	–	2	–	2
Tulsa	2	–	2	–	0	7	–	3	–	0
Houston	2	–	2	–	0	5	–	4	–	0
Wichita	1	–	2	–	1	4	–	5	–	1
$ – Conference champion

1958 Pacific Coast Conference football standings
	Conf.					Overall
Team	W		L		T	W		L		T
No. 16 California $	6	–	1	–	0	7	–	4	–	0
Washington State	6	–	2	–	0	7	–	3	–	0
USC	4	–	2	–	1	4	–	5	–	1
Oregon State	5	–	3	–	0	6	–	4	–	0
Oregon	4	–	4	–	0	4	–	6	–	0
UCLA	2	–	4	–	1	3	–	6	–	1
Stanford	2	–	5	–	0	2	–	8	–	0
Washington	1	–	6	–	0	3	–	7	–	0
Idaho	0	–	3	–	0	4	–	5	–	0
$ – Conference champion; Rankings from AP poll

1958 Skyline Conference football standings
	Conf.					Overall
Team	W		L		T	W		L		T
Wyoming $	6	–	1	–	0	8	–	3	–	0
New Mexico	5	–	1	–	0	7	–	3	–	0
BYU	5	–	2	–	0	6	–	4	–	0
Colorado State	4	–	3	–	0	6	–	4	–	0
Utah	3	–	3	–	0	4	–	7	–	0
Utah State	2	–	5	–	0	3	–	7	–	0
Denver	2	–	5	–	0	2	–	8	–	0
Montana	0	–	7	–	0	0	–	10	–	0
$ – Conference champion

1958 Southeastern Conference football standings
	Conf.					Overall
Team	W		L		T	W		L		T
No. 1 LSU $	6	–	0	–	0	11	–	0	–	0
No. 4 Auburn	6	–	0	–	1	9	–	0	–	1
No. 11 Ole Miss	4	–	2	–	0	9	–	2	–	0
Vanderbilt	2	–	1	–	3	5	–	2	–	3
Tennessee	4	–	3	–	0	4	–	6	–	0
Alabama	3	–	4	–	1	5	–	4	–	1
Kentucky	3	–	4	–	1	5	–	4	–	1
No. 14 Florida	2	–	3	–	1	6	–	4	–	1
Georgia Tech	2	–	3	–	1	5	–	4	–	1
Georgia	2	–	4	–	0	4	–	6	–	0
Tulane	1	–	5	–	0	3	–	7	–	0
Mississippi State	1	–	6	–	0	3	–	6	–	0
$ – Conference champion; Ole Miss's game against Houston counted in the conference standings.; Rankings from AP Poll

1958 Southern Conference football standings
	Conf.					Overall
Team	W		L		T	W		L		T
West Virginia $	4	–	0	–	0	4	–	5	–	1
VPI	3	–	1	–	0	5	–	4	–	1
George Washington	3	–	2	–	0	3	–	5	–	0
VMI	2	–	2	–	1	6	–	2	–	2
Richmond	3	–	4	–	0	3	–	7	–	0
The Citadel	2	–	3	–	0	4	–	6	–	0
Davidson	2	–	3	–	0	5	–	4	–	0
Furman	1	–	2	–	0	2	–	7	–	0
William & Mary	1	–	4	–	1	2	–	6	–	1
$ – Conference champion

1958 Southwest Conference football standings
	Conf.					Overall
Team	W		L		T	W		L		T
No. 10 TCU $	5	–	1	–	0	8	–	2	–	1
No. 18 SMU	4	–	2	–	0	6	–	4	–	0
Rice	4	–	2	–	0	5	–	5	–	0
Texas	3	–	3	–	0	7	–	3	–	0
Arkansas	2	–	4	–	0	4	–	6	–	0
Texas A&M	2	–	4	–	0	4	–	6	–	0
Baylor	1	–	5	–	0	3	–	7	–	0
$ – Conference champion; Rankings from AP Poll

=== Major independents ===
1958 Eastern major college football independents records
	Conf.			Overall
Team	W	L	T	W		L		T
No. 3 Army		–		8	–	0	–	1
No. 9 Syracuse		–		8	–	2	–	0
Boston College		–		7	–	3	–	0
Holy Cross		–		6	–	3	–	0
Penn State		–		6	–	3	–	1
Villanova		–		6	–	4	–	0
Pittsburgh		–		5	–	4	–	1
Boston University		–		4	–	5	–	0
Colgate		–		1	–	8	–	0
Rankings from AP poll

1958 Midwestern major college football independents records
	Conf.			Overall
Team	W	L	T	W		L		T
No. 17 Notre Dame		–		6	–	4	–	0
Detroit		–		4	–	4	–	1
Marquette		–		2	–	7	–	1
Drake		–		2	–	7	–	0
Dayton		–		2	–	8	–	0
Rankings from AP poll

1958 Southern major college football independents records
	Conf.			Overall
Team	W	L	T	W		L		T
No. 19 Oklahoma State		–		8	–	3	–	0
Florida State		–		7	–	4	–	0
Navy		–		6	–	3	–	0
Texas Tech		–		3	–	7	–	0
Miami (FL)		–		2	–	8	–	0
Rankings from AP poll

1958 Western major college football independents records
	Conf.			Overall
Team	W	L	T	W		L		T
No. 6 Air Force		–		9	–	0	–	2
Pacific (CA)		–		6	–	4	–	0
San Jose State		–		4	–	5	–	0
Rankings from AP poll

=== Minor conference standings ===
1958 Arkansas Intercollegiate Conference football standings
	Conf.					Overall
Team	W		L		T	W		L		T
Arkansas A&M +	5	–	1	–	0	7	–	2	–	0
Arkansas Tech +	5	–	1	–	0	7	–	2	–	0
Arkansas State Teachers	4	–	1	–	0	7	–	2	–	0
Henderson State	2	–	3	–	0	3	–	6	–	0
Ozarks	2	–	4	–	0	3	–	5	–	0
Ouachita Baptist	0	–	4	–	1	2	–	5	–	1
Hendrix	0	–	4	–	1	1	–	6	–	1
+ – Conference co-champions

1958 Badger-Gopher Conference football standings
	Conf.					Overall
Team	W		L		T	W		L		T
Bethel (MN) $	5	–	0	–	0	5	–	3	–	0
Wisconsin Tech	3	–	1	–	1	?	–	?	–	?
Northland	2	–	2	–	1	?	–	?	–	?
Northwestern (WI)	2	–	3	–	0	5	–	3	–	0
Lakeland	2	–	3	–	0	2	–	6	–	0
Milton	0	–	5	–	0	?	–	?	–	?
$ – Conference champion

1958 California Collegiate Athletic Association football standings
	Conf.					Overall
Team	W		L		T	W		L		T
No. 15 Cal Poly +	4	–	1	–	0	9	–	1	–	0
Fresno State +	4	–	1	–	0	5	–	5	–	0
UC Santa Barbara	3	–	2	–	0	4	–	4	–	1
San Diego State	2	–	3	–	0	3	–	5	–	0
Long Beach State	1	–	3	–	1	2	–	6	–	1
Los Angeles State	0	–	4	–	1	4	–	4	–	1
+ – Conference co-champions; Rankings from UPI small college poll

1958 Central Intercollegiate Athletic Association football standings
	Conf.					Overall
Team	W		L		T	W		L		T
North Carolina A&T $	6	–	0	–	0	7	–	2	–	0
North Carolina College	5	–	1	–	0	7	–	2	–	0
Morgan State	5	–	2	–	0	5	–	3	–	0
Shaw	6	–	3	–	0	6	–	3	–	0
Bluefield State	4	–	2	–	0	5	–	2	–	1
St. Augustine's	6	–	2	–	0	6	–	2	–	0
Maryland State	4	–	3	–	0	4	–	3	–	0
Howard	4	–	2	–	0	5	–	2	–	1
Johnson C. Smith	5	–	2	–	0	6	–	2	–	0
Hampton	6	–	3	–	0	7	–	3	–	0
Delaware State	3	–	4	–	0	3	–	5	–	0
Virginia State	3	–	6	–	0	3	–	6	–	0
Winston-Salem State	3	–	5	–	0	3	–	5	–	1
Elizabeth City State	2	–	5	–	0	3	–	6	–	0
Fayetteville State	1	–	7	–	0	1	–	7	–	0
Lincoln (PA)	1	–	5	–	0	1	–	7	–	0
Virginia Union	1	–	6	–	0	2	–	6	–	0
Saint Paul's (VA)	0	–	7	–	0	0	–	8	–	0
$ – Conference champion; Conference standings were based on the Dickinson System.

1958 Central Intercollegiate Conference football standings
	Conf.					Overall
Team	W		L		T	W		L		T
No. 9 St. Benedict's $^	5	–	0	–	0	10	–	1	–	0
Pittsburg State	3	–	2	–	0	4	–	5	–	1
Emporia State	2	–	2	–	1	5	–	4	–	1
Fort Hays State	2	–	2	–	1	4	–	4	–	1
Washburn	2	–	3	–	0	4	–	5	–	0
Southwestern (KS)	0	–	5	–	0	1	–	7	–	1
$ – Conference champion; ^ – NAIA playoff participant; Rankings from UPI small college poll

1958 College Conference of Illinois football standings
	Conf.					Overall
Team	W		L		T	W		L		T
Wheaton (IL) $	7	–	0	–	0	8	–	0	–	0
Carroll (WI)	5	–	2	–	0	6	–	2	–	0
North Central (IL)	5	–	2	–	0	6	–	3	–	0
Lake Forest	4	–	3	–	0	5	–	3	–	0
Illinois Wesleyan	4	–	3	–	0	4	–	4	–	0
Millikin	2	–	5	–	0	2	–	6	–	0
Augustana (IL)	2	–	6	–	0	1	–	7	–	0
Elmhurst	0	–	7	–	0	0	–	8	–	0
$ – Conference champion

1958 Eastern Intercollegiate Athletic Conference football standings
	Conf.					Overall
Team	W		L		T	W		L		T
South Carolina Trade $	4	–	1	–	1	4	–	3	–	1
Livingstone	3	–	1	–	0	6	–	2	–	0
Norfolk State	4	–	2	–	0	5	–	3	–	0
Kittrell	3	–	2	–	0	?	–	?	–	?
Voorhees	2	–	2	–	1	?	–	?	–	?
Morristown	1	–	5	–	0	?	–	?	–	?
Friendship	0	–	5	–	0	?	–	?	–	?
$ – Conference champion

1958 Evergreen Conference football standings
	Conf.					Overall
Team	W		L		T	W		L		T
Central Washington +	4	–	1	–	0	6	–	1	–	1
Western Washington +	4	–	1	–	0	6	–	2	–	0
Puget Sound	3	–	2	–	0	4	–	5	–	0
Eastern Washington	2	–	3	–	0	4	–	4	–	0
Whitworth	1	–	4	–	0	3	–	7	–	0
Pacific Lutheran	1	–	4	–	0	1	–	7	–	0
+ – Conference co-champions

1958 Far Western Conference football standings
	Conf.					Overall
Team	W		L		T	W		L		T
San Francisco State $	4	–	1	–	0	7	–	3	–	0
Humboldt State	3	–	2	–	0	7	–	2	–	1
Cal Aggies	3	–	2	–	0	5	–	4	–	0
Chico State	2	–	3	–	0	5	–	5	–	0
Nevada	2	–	3	–	0	3	–	3	–	0
Sacramento State	1	–	4	–	0	3	–	6	–	0
$ – Conference champion

1958 Frontier Conference football standings
	Conf.					Overall
Team	W		L		T	W		L		T
Arizona State–Flagstaff $^	3	–	0	–	0	11	–	1	–	0
New Mexico Western	2	–	1	–	0	6	–	2	–	0
New Mexico Highlands	1	–	2	–	0	5	–	2	–	1
Panhandle A&M	0	–	3	–	0	4	–	6	–	0
$ – Conference champion; ^ – NAIA playoff participant

1958 Gulf States Conference football standings
	Conf.					Overall
Team	W		L		T	W		L		T
Northwestern State +	4	–	1	–	0	8	–	2	–	0
Louisiana Tech +	4	–	1	–	0	7	–	3	–	0
Northeast Louisiana State	3	–	2	–	0	6	–	3	–	0
McNeese State	2	–	3	–	0	5	–	5	–	0
Southeastern Louisiana	2	–	3	–	0	4	–	5	–	0
Southwestern Louisiana	0	–	5	–	0	1	–	8	–	0
+ – Conference co-champions

1958 Hoosier Conference football standings
	Conf.					Overall
Team	W		L		T	W		L		T
Hanover $	5	–	0	–	0	5	–	4	–	0
Anderson (IN)	4	–	1	–	0	8	–	1	–	0
Indiana Central	2	–	3	–	0	3	–	6	–	0
Taylor	2	–	3	–	0	3	–	6	–	0
Manchester (IN)	1	–	4	–	0	3	–	6	–	0
Franklin (IN)	1	–	4	–	0	2	–	6	–	0
+ – Conference co-champions

1958 Indiana Collegiate Conference football standings
	Conf.					Overall
Team	W		L		T	W		L		T
Butler $	5	–	1	–	0	8	–	1	–	0
Ball State	4	–	2	–	0	6	–	2	–	0
Saint Joseph's (IN)	4	–	2	–	0	5	–	4	–	0
Valparaiso	3	–	3	–	0	6	–	3	–	0
Evansville	3	–	3	–	0	4	–	5	–	0
DePauw	1	–	5	–	0	2	–	7	–	0
Indiana State	1	–	5	–	0	2	–	6	–	0
$ – Conference champion

1958 Interstate Intercollegiate Athletic Conference football standings
	Conf.					Overall
Team	W		L		T	W		L		T
Western Illinois $	5	–	1	–	0	6	–	1	–	1
Southern Illinois	4	–	2	–	0	7	–	2	–	0
Central Michigan	4	–	2	–	0	7	–	3	–	0
Eastern Michigan	3	–	3	–	0	4	–	5	–	0
Northern Illinois	2	–	4	–	0	4	–	5	–	0
Illinois State Normal	2	–	4	–	0	3	–	6	–	0
Eastern Illinois	1	–	5	–	0	2	–	6	–	0
$ – Conference champion

1958 Iowa Conference football standings
	Conf.					Overall
Team	W		L		T	W		L		T
Wartburg $	7	–	0	–	1	8	–	0	–	1
Luther	6	–	1	–	1	7	–	1	–	1
Iowa Wesleyan	6	–	2	–	0	6	–	3	–	0
Buena Vista	4	–	4	–	0	5	–	4	–	0
Dubuque	4	–	4	–	0	5	–	4	–	0
Upper Iowa	3	–	5	–	0	3	–	5	–	0
Simpson (IA)	2	–	5	–	1	2	–	5	–	1
Parsons	2	–	6	–	0	4	–	6	–	0
Central (IA)	0	–	7	–	1	0	–	8	–	1
$ – Conference champion

1958 Kansas Collegiate Athletic Conference football standings
	Conf.					Overall
Team	W		L		T	W		L		T
Baker $	7	–	0	–	0	8	–	1	–	0
McPherson	6	–	1	–	0	8	–	1	–	0
Ottawa	3	–	3	–	1	3	–	5	–	1
Kansas Wesleyan	3	–	4	–	0	4	–	4	–	1
College of Emporia	3	–	4	–	0	4	–	5	–	0
Bethany (KS)	2	–	4	–	1	3	–	4	–	1
Bethel (KS)	2	–	4	–	1	3	–	5	–	1
Friends	0	–	6	–	1	0	–	8	–	1
$ – Conference champion

1958 Lone Star Conference football standings
	Conf.					Overall
Team	W		L		T	W		L		T
No. 5 East Texas State $	6	–	1	–	0	10	–	1	–	0
Lamar Tech	5	–	2	–	0	6	–	2	–	0
Sam Houston State	5	–	2	–	0	7	–	2	–	0
Texas A&I	4	–	3	–	0	7	–	4	–	0
Southwest Texas State	4	–	3	–	0	5	–	5	–	0
Howard Payne	2	–	5	–	0	2	–	7	–	0
Stephen F. Austin	1	–	6	–	0	2	–	7	–	0
Sul Ross	1	–	6	–	0	2	–	8	–	0
$ – Conference champion; Rankings from UPI small college poll

1958 Mason–Dixon Conference football standings
	Conf.					Overall
Team	W		L		T	W		L		T
Randolph–Macon $	5	–	0	–	0	5	–	4	–	0
Hampden–Sydney	3	–	1	–	0	6	–	3	–	0
Western Maryland	2	–	2	–	0	3	–	6	–	0
Bridgewater	1	–	3	–	0	1	–	6	–	1
Johns Hopkins	0	–	3	–	0	5	–	3	–	0
Gallaudet	0	–	2	–	0	2	–	5	–	0
$ – Conference champion; Conference standings were based on the Dickinson Scoring System.

1958 Michigan Intercollegiate Athletic Association football standings
	Conf.					Overall
Team	W		L		T	W		L		T
Hope +	5	–	1	–	0	8	–	1	–	0
Hillsdale +	5	–	1	–	0	7	–	2	–	0
Albion +	5	–	1	–	0	6	–	2	–	0
Alma	3	–	3	–	0	5	–	3	–	0
Adrian	2	–	4	–	0	3	–	5	–	0
Olivet	1	–	5	–	0	1	–	8	–	0
Kalamazoo	0	–	6	–	0	0	–	8	–	0
+ – Conference co-champions

1958 Mid-American Conference football standings
	Conf.					Overall
Team	W		L		T	W		L		T
No. 2 Miami (OH) $	5	–	0	–	0	6	–	3	–	0
Kent State	5	–	1	–	0	7	–	2	–	0
No. 14 Bowling Green	4	–	2	–	0	7	–	2	–	0
Ohio	2	–	4	–	0	5	–	4	–	0
Western Michigan	2	–	4	–	0	4	–	5	–	0
Toledo	1	–	4	–	0	4	–	5	–	0
Marshall	1	–	5	–	0	3	–	6	–	0
$ – Conference champion; Rankings from UPI small college poll

1958 Mid-Ohio League football standings
	Conf.					Overall
Team	W		L		T	W		L		T
Bluffton $	5	–	0	–	0	8	–	1	–	0
Findlay	4	–	1	–	0	4	–	4	–	1
Defiance	3	–	2	–	0	4	–	4	–	0
Ohio Northern	1	–	4	–	0	1	–	6	–	0
Wilmington (OH)	1	–	4	–	0	1	–	6	–	0
Ashland	1	–	4	–	0	1	–	8	–	0
$ – Conference champion

1958 Middle Atlantic Conference football standings
	Conf.					Overall
Team	W		L		T	W		L		T
University Division
No. 20 Rutgers x	4	–	0	–	0	8	–	1	–	0
Lafayette	5	–	1	–	1	5	–	3	–	1
Gettysburg	3	–	1	–	1	7	–	1	–	1
Lehigh	2	–	1	–	2	3	–	3	–	3
Delaware	2	–	3	–	0	5	–	3	–	0
Bucknell	1	–	5	–	0	1	–	8	–	0
Temple	0	–	5	–	0	0	–	8	–	0
Muhlenberg *	1	–	2	–	0	4	–	4	–	0
Northern College Division
Juniata x	6	–	0	–	0	7	–	0	–	1
Lycoming	4	–	1	–	0	7	–	1	–	0
Lebanon Valley	3	–	1	–	1	4	–	3	–	1
Susquehanna	3	–	2	–	0	3	–	4	–	0
Moravian	3	–	3	–	0	4	–	4	–	0
Wagner	3	–	3	–	0	3	–	5	–	0
Dickinson	3	–	4	–	0	4	–	4	–	0
Albright	2	–	4	–	1	2	–	6	–	1
Wilkes	1	–	7	–	0	1	–	8	–	0
Scranton *	2	–	2	–	0	5	–	3	–	0
Southern College Division
Pennsylvania Military x	7	–	1	–	0	7	–	2	–	0
Johns Hopkins	5	–	1	–	0	5	–	3	–	0
Haverford	4	–	2	–	0	4	–	3	–	0
Western Maryland	1	–	4	–	0	3	–	6	–	0
Swarthmore	1	–	4	–	0	1	–	7	–	0
Drexel	1	–	5	–	0	1	–	7	–	0
Ursinus	0	–	8	–	0	0	–	8	–	0
West Chester *	1	–	0	–	0	9	–	1	–	0
Franklin & Marshall *	3	–	1	–	0	5	–	4	–	0
x – Division champion/co-champions; * – Ineligible for championship due to insufficient conference games; Rankings from AP Poll

1958 Midwest Athletic Association football standings
	Conf.					Overall
Team	W		L		T	W		L		T
No. 5 Lincoln (MO) $	3	–	0	–	0	7	–	1	–	0
No. 8 Jackson State	2	–	0	–	0	6	–	2	–	1
No. 14 Tennessee A&I	2	–	1	–	0	4	–	4	–	0
Central State (OH)	1	–	2	–	0	5	–	2	–	0
Kentucky State	0	–	3	–	0	0	–	7	–	1
$ – Conference champion; Rankings from Pittsburgh Courier

1958 Midwest Conference football standings
	Conf.					Overall
Team	W		L		T	W		L		T
Coe $	7	–	1	–	0	7	–	1	–	0
Carleton	6	–	1	–	1	6	–	1	–	1
Ripon	6	–	2	–	0	6	–	2	–	0
St. Olaf	4	–	4	–	0	4	–	4	–	0
Cornell (IA)	3	–	4	–	1	3	–	4	–	1
Grinnell	2	–	4	–	2	2	–	4	–	2
Knox	2	–	5	–	1	2	–	5	–	1
Monmouth (IL)	2	–	5	–	1	2	–	5	–	1
Lawrence	1	–	7	–	0	1	–	7	–	0
$ – Conference champion

1958 Minnesota Intercollegiate Athletic Conference football standings
	Conf.					Overall
Team	W		L		T	W		L		T
No. 13 Gustavus Adolphus $^	7	–	0	–	0	8	–	1	–	0
Concordia (MN)	6	–	1	–	0	7	–	2	–	0
Saint John's (MN)	5	–	2	–	0	6	–	2	–	0
Minnesota–Duluth	4	–	3	–	0	4	–	4	–	0
St. Thomas (MN)	3	–	4	–	0	4	–	4	–	0
Macalester	2	–	5	–	0	3	–	6	–	0
Hamline	2	–	5	–	0	2	–	6	–	0
Augsburg	0	–	7	–	0	0	–	8	–	0
$ – Conference champion; ^ – NAIA playoff participant; Rankings from UPI small college poll

1958 Missouri College Athletic Union football standings
	Conf.					Overall
Team	W		L		T	W		L		T
Missouri Valley $	3	–	0	–	0	8	–	1	–	0
William Jewell	2	–	1	–	0	7	–	3	–	0
Culver–Stockton	2	–	2	–	0	5	–	5	–	0
Tarkio	1	–	3	–	0	4	–	5	–	0
Central (MO)	0	–	2	–	0	1	–	6	–	0
$ – Conference champion

1958 Missouri Intercollegiate Athletic Association football standings
	Conf.					Overall
Team	W		L		T	W		L		T
SE Missouri State $	5	–	0	–	0	7	–	1	–	1
Missouri–Rolla	4	–	1	–	0	5	–	4	–	0
NE Missouri State	3	–	2	–	0	5	–	4	–	0
SW Missouri State	2	–	3	–	0	4	–	5	–	0
Central Missouri State	1	–	4	–	0	2	–	6	–	1
NW Missouri State	0	–	5	–	0	0	–	8	–	0
$ – Conference champion

1958 Montana Collegiate Conference football standings
	Conf.					Overall
Team	W		L		T	W		L		T
Eastern Montana $	5	–	0	–	0	5	–	2	–	0
Western Montana	4	–	1	–	0	5	–	3	–	0
Rocky Mountain	3	–	2	–	0	3	–	3	–	0
Northern Montana	2	–	3	–	0	3	–	3	–	0
Carroll (MT)	1	–	4	–	0	2	–	6	–	0
Montana Mines	0	–	5	–	0	?	–	?	–	?
$ – Conference champion

1958 Nebraska College Conference football standings
	Conf.					Overall
Team	W		L		T	W		L		T
Kearney State +	7	–	0	–	0	9	–	0	–	0
Chadron State +	7	–	0	–	0	8	–	0	–	0
Peru State	6	–	1	–	0	7	–	1	–	0
Nebraska Wesleyan	5	–	3	–	0	5	–	4	–	0
Hastings	4	–	3	–	0	4	–	4	–	0
Wayne State (NE)	4	–	4	–	0	4	–	5	–	0
Doane	3	–	6	–	0	3	–	6	–	0
Concordia (NE)	1	–	7	–	0	2	–	7	–	0
Midland	1	–	7	–	0	1	–	7	–	0
Dana	0	–	7	–	0	0	–	8	–	0
+ – Conference co-champions

1958 North Central Conference football standings
	Conf.					Overall
Team	W		L		T	W		L		T
North Dakota $	5	–	1	–	0	5	–	3	–	0
South Dakota	4	–	2	–	0	5	–	4	–	0
Augustana (SD)	3	–	3	–	0	5	–	3	–	0
Morningside	3	–	3	–	0	4	–	4	–	0
South Dakota State	3	–	3	–	0	4	–	5	–	0
North Dakota State	2	–	4	–	0	3	–	6	–	0
Iowa State Teachers	1	–	5	–	0	4	–	5	–	0
$ – Conference champion

1958 North Dakota Intercollegiate Conference football standings
	Conf.					Overall
Team	W		L		T	W		L		T
Valley City State +	6	–	1	–	0	6	–	1	–	0
Dickinson State +	6	–	1	–	0	6	–	1	–	0
Jamestown	5	–	2	–	0	5	–	3	–	0
Mayville State	4	–	3	–	0	4	–	3	–	0
Minot State	3	–	3	–	1	3	–	3	–	1
Wahpeton Science	2	–	5	–	0	2	–	5	–	0
Ellendale	1	–	5	–	1	1	–	5	–	1
Bismarck JC	0	–	7	–	0	0	–	7	–	0
+ – Conference co-champions

1958 North State Conference football standings
	Conf.					Overall
Team	W		L		T	W		L		T
Lenoir Rhyne $	6	–	0	–	0	9	–	1	–	0
Appalachian State	4	–	2	–	0	6	–	4	–	0
East Carolina	4	–	2	–	0	6	–	4	–	0
Catawba	2	–	3	–	1	5	–	3	–	2
Elon	2	–	4	–	0	3	–	6	–	0
Western Carolina	1	–	4	–	1	1	–	8	–	1
Guilford	1	–	5	–	0	3	–	6	–	0
$ – Conference champion

1958 Northern State College Conference football standings
	Conf.					Overall
Team	W		L		T	W		L		T
Mankato State $	5	–	0	–	0	7	–	2	–	0
Bemidji State	4	–	1	–	0	7	–	1	–	0
Michigan Tech	2	–	2	–	0	4	–	4	–	0
Winona State	1	–	3	–	1	3	–	4	–	1
Moorhead State	1	–	4	–	0	1	–	7	–	0
St. Cloud State	0	–	3	–	1	1	–	6	–	1
$ – Conference champion

1958 Northwest Conference football standings
	Conf.					Overall
Team	W		L		T	W		L		T
Willamette $	5	–	0	–	0	8	–	1	–	0
Linfield	3	–	1	–	1	7	–	1	–	1
Lewis & Clark	2	–	2	–	1	4	–	4	–	1
Whitman	2	–	3	–	0	4	–	4	–	0
College of Idaho	1	–	3	–	1	3	–	6	–	1
Pacific (OR)	0	–	4	–	1	1	–	7	–	1
$ – Conference champion

1958 Ohio Athletic Conference football standings
	Conf.					Overall
Team	W		L		T	W		L		T
No. T–16 Wittenberg $	6	–	0	–	0	8	–	1	–	0
Muskingum	6	–	1	–	0	8	–	1	–	0
Akron	6	–	2	–	0	6	–	2	–	1
Wooster	4	–	2	–	0	6	–	3	–	0
Capital	4	–	3	–	1	4	–	3	–	1
Heidelberg	3	–	3	–	0	6	–	3	–	0
Ohio Wesleyan	3	–	3	–	0	6	–	3	–	0
Marietta	3	–	4	–	0	5	–	4	–	0
Kenyon	3	–	4	–	0	3	–	4	–	0
Denison	3	–	5	–	0	4	–	5	–	0
Otterbein	2	–	4	–	1	3	–	4	–	2
Mount Union	3	–	6	–	0	3	–	6	–	0
Oberlin	1	–	5	–	0	3	–	5	–	0
Hiram	1	–	6	–	0	1	–	7	–	0
$ – Conference champion; Rankings from UPI small college poll

1958 Ohio Valley Conference football standings
	Conf.					Overall
Team	W		L		T	W		L		T
No. 11 Middle Tennessee +	5	–	1	–	0	8	–	2	–	0
Tennessee Tech +	5	–	1	–	0	7	–	3	–	0
East Tennessee State	4	–	2	–	0	5	–	4	–	0
Eastern Kentucky	3	–	3	–	0	3	–	6	–	0
Western Kentucky	2	–	4	–	0	4	–	5	–	0
Murray State	2	–	4	–	0	3	–	7	–	0
Morehead State	0	–	6	–	0	0	–	8	–	1
+ – Conference co-champions; Rankings from UPI small college poll

1958 Oklahoma Collegiate Conference football standings
	Conf.					Overall
Team	W		L		T	W		L		T
Northeastern State $^	6	–	0	–	0	11	–	0	–	0
Central State (OK)	4	–	2	–	0	5	–	4	–	0
NW Oklahoma State	3	–	3	–	0	6	–	3	–	0
Langston	3	–	3	–	0	4	–	4	–	0
SE Oklahoma State	2	–	4	–	0	3	–	5	–	0
SW Oklahoma State	2	–	4	–	0	2	–	6	–	1
East Central	1	–	5	–	0	2	–	7	–	0
$ – Conference champion; ^ – NAIA playoff participant

1958 Oregon Collegiate Conference football standings
	Conf.					Overall
Team	W		L		T	W		L		T
Oregon College $	4	–	0	–	0	5	–	4	–	0
Southern Oregon	3	–	1	–	0	5	–	5	–	0
Portland State	2	–	2	–	0	4	–	5	–	0
Eastern Oregon	1	–	3	–	0	1	–	8	–	0
Oregon Tech *	0	–	4	–	0	2	–	6	–	0
$ – Conference champion; * – Oregon Tech forfeited wins over Eastern Oregon, Oregon College, and Portland State due to ineligible players.

1958 Pennsylvania State Teachers College Conference football standings
	Conf.					Overall
Team	W		L		T	W		L		T
California (PA) $	6	–	0	–	0	8	–	0	–	0
No. T–16 West Chester	6	–	0	–	0	9	–	1	–	0
Indiana (PA)	4	–	1	–	0	5	–	3	–	0
Lock Haven	5	–	2	–	0	5	–	3	–	0
Bloomsburg	3	–	2	–	1	5	–	2	–	1
Slippery Rock	2	–	3	–	1	2	–	6	–	1
Millersville	3	–	3	–	0	6	–	3	–	0
Shippensburg	3	–	4	–	0	4	–	4	–	0
Edinboro	2	–	4	–	1	4	–	4	–	1
Clarion	2	–	4	–	0	3	–	6	–	0
East Stroudsburg	1	–	3	–	1	2	–	5	–	2
Kutztown	1	–	2	–	0	3	–	3	–	1
Mansfield	1	–	6	–	0	2	–	6	–	0
Cheyney	0	–	5	–	0	0	–	7	–	0
$ – Conference champion; Conference standings were based on the Saylor system of ratings.; Rankings from UPI small college poll

1958 Presidents' Athletic Conference football standings
	Conf.					Overall
Team	W		L		T	W		L		T
Western Reserve $	4	–	0	–	0	4	–	3	–	0
Allegheny	3	–	1	–	1	3	–	4	–	1
Wayne State (MI)	2	–	1	–	1	2	–	4	–	1
Thiel *	1	–	1	–	1	2	–	4	–	1
John Carroll	3	–	4	–	0	3	–	4	–	0
Case Tech	2	–	3	–	1	2	–	4	–	1
Bethany (WV)	1	–	3	–	0	1	–	6	–	1
Washington & Jefferson	1	–	4	–	0	1	–	7	–	0
$ – Conference champion; * Ineligible for conference title

1958 Rocky Mountain Conference football standings
	Conf.					Overall
Team	W		L		T	W		L		T
Colorado Mines +	4	–	1	–	0	7	–	3	–	0
Colorado College +	4	–	1	–	0	6	–	3	–	0
Idaho State	3	–	2	–	0	4	–	5	–	0
Colorado State–Greeley	3	–	2	–	0	5	–	3	–	1
Adams State	1	–	4	–	0	1	–	8	–	0
Western State (CO)	0	–	5	–	0	1	–	8	–	0
+ – Conference co-champions

1958 South Dakota Intercollegiate Conference football standings
	Conf.					Overall
Team	W		L		T	W		L		T
Huron $	7	–	0	–	1	9	–	0	–	1
Northern State	7	–	1	–	0	8	–	2	–	0
Southern State (SD)	6	–	1	–	1	6	–	2	–	1
Yankton	5	–	3	–	0	6	–	3	–	0
Sioux Falls	3	–	4	–	1	3	–	4	–	1
South Dakota Mines	1	–	4	–	3	1	–	4	–	3
General Beadle	2	–	6	–	0	2	–	6	–	0
Dakota Wesleyan	1	–	6	–	1	1	–	7	–	1
Black Hills	0	–	7	–	1	0	–	7	–	1
$ – Conference champion

1958 Southern California Intercollegiate Athletic Conference football standings
	Conf.					Overall
Team	W		L		T	W		L		T
Whittier $	4	–	0	–	0	8	–	1	–	0
Redlands	3	–	1	–	0	7	–	3	–	0
Occidental	2	–	2	–	0	3	–	5	–	1
Pomona	1	–	3	–	0	3	–	5	–	1
Caltech	0	–	4	–	0	2	–	5	–	1
$ – Conference champion

1958 Southern Intercollegiate Athletic Conference football standings
	Conf.					Overall
Team	W		L		T	W		L		T
Florida A&M $	5	–	0	–	0	7	–	2	–	0
South Carolina State	7	–	1	–	0	7	–	2	–	0
Alabama State	6	–	1	–	0	6	–	2	–	0
Tuskegee	5	–	2	–	1	6	–	3	–	1
Fort Valley State	3	–	2	–	1	5	–	2	–	1
Xavier (LA)	3	–	2	–	1	3	–	3	–	1
Clark (GA)	3	–	4	–	0	4	–	4	–	0
Benedict	3	–	3	–	0	5	–	5	–	0
Morehouse	3	–	3	–	0	3	–	4	–	1
Morris Brown	2	–	4	–	0	4	–	5	–	0
Alabama A&M	1	–	7	–	1	1	–	7	–	1
Knoxville	1	–	6	–	0	2	–	6	–	0
Fisk	1	–	7	–	0	1	–	7	–	0
Bethune–Cookman	1	–	6	–	0	1	–	7	–	0
Allen	4	–	2	–	0	5	–	3	–	0
Lane	3	–	1	–	0	4	–	4	–	1
$ – Conference champion; Conference standings were based on Dickinson System ratings. Allen was ineligible, and Lane did not play a sufficient number of conference game to be rated.

1958 Southwestern Athletic Conference football standings
	Conf.					Overall
Team	W		L		T	W		L		T
Prairie View A&M $	5	–	0	–	0	10	–	0	–	1
Southern	3	–	2	–	0	8	–	2	–	0
Texas College	3	–	2	–	0	5	–	4	–	0
Texas Southern	2	–	3	–	0	5	–	5	–	0
Wiley	2	–	3	–	0	5	–	5	–	0
Arkansas AM&N	0	–	5	–	0	3	–	6	–	0
$ – Conference champion

1958 Virginia Little Eight Conference football standings
	Conf.					Overall
Team	W		L		T	W		L		T
Randolph–Macon $	2	–	0	–	0	5	–	4	–	0
Emory and Henry	1	–	0	–	0	7	–	2	–	0
Hampden–Sydney	1	–	2	–	0	6	–	3	–	0
Bridgewater	0	–	2	–	0	3	–	4	–	0
$ – Conference champion

1958 West Penn Conference football standings
	Conf.					Overall
Team	W		L		T	W		L		T
Westminster (PA) $	3	–	1	–	0	6	–	1	–	1
Geneva	2	–	1	–	1	5	–	3	–	1
Saint Vincent	1	–	1	–	1	4	–	2	–	1
Carnegie Tech *	1	–	1	–	0	6	–	2	–	0
Waynesburg	0	–	3	–	0	3	–	5	–	1
$ – Conference champion; * – ineligible for conference title

1958 West Virginia Intercollegiate Athletic Conference football standings
	Conf.					Overall
Team	W		L		T	W		L		T
Glenville State $	6	–	0	–	1	6	–	0	–	1
Shepherd	4	–	0	–	1	5	–	2	–	1
West Virginia Tech	4	–	2	–	0	5	–	3	–	1
Fairmont State	5	–	2	–	1	5	–	2	–	1
West Virginia State	2	–	1	–	1	3	–	4	–	1
West Virginia Wesleyan	2	–	3	–	1	2	–	4	–	2
Potomac State	1	–	2	–	1	4	–	4	–	1
Concord	2	–	4	–	0	3	–	5	–	0
Davis & Elkins	2	–	5	–	0	2	–	5	–	0
West Liberty State	2	–	6	–	0	2	–	7	–	0
Salem	1	–	7	–	0	1	–	7	–	0
Bluefield State *	1	–	0	–	1	5	–	2	–	1
Bethany (WV) *	0	–	0	–	1	1	–	6	–	1
$ – Conference champion; * – Did not qualify for conference standings Conference standings based on power ratings

1958 Wisconsin State College Conference football standings
	Conf.					Overall
Team	W		L		T	W		L		T
River Falls State $	6	–	0	–	0	7	–	2	–	0
Stevens Point State	5	–	0	–	1	7	–	0	–	1
Oshkosh State	4	–	2	–	0	6	–	2	–	0
Whitewater State	4	–	2	–	0	5	–	3	–	0
La Crosse State	3	–	3	–	0	5	–	3	–	0
Eau Claire State	3	–	3	–	0	3	–	5	–	0
Platteville State	1	–	4	–	1	1	–	4	–	1
Milwaukee	1	–	5	–	0	3	–	5	–	0
Superior State	1	–	5	–	0	3	–	6	–	0
Stout State	1	–	5	–	0	1	–	7	–	0
$ – Conference champion; Stevens Point State beat River Falls State on September 18, but the game was not counted in the conference standings.

1958 Yankee Conference football standings
	Conf.					Overall
Team	W		L		T	W		L		T
No. 12 Connecticut $	4	–	0	–	0	7	–	3	–	0
Maine	3	–	1	–	0	6	–	2	–	0
Rhode Island	2	–	2	–	0	4	–	4	–	0
UMass	1	–	3	–	0	2	–	6	–	0
Vermont	0	–	1	–	0	2	–	4	–	1
New Hampshire	0	–	4	–	0	2	–	6	–	0
$ – Conference champion; Rankings from UPI small college poll

1958 NAIA independents football records
	Conf.			Overall
Team	W	L	T	W		L		T
Southern Connecticut State		–		7	–	2	–	0
Georgetown (KY)		–		6	–	2	–	0
Austin		–		6	–	3	–	0
La Verne		–		5	–	3	–	1
McMurry		–		6	–	4	–	0
Carson–Newman		–		4	–	5	–	0
Oklahoma Panhandle State		–		4	–	6	–	0
Eastern New Mexico		–		3	–	6	–	1
Earlham		–		0	–	7	–	0

=== Non-major independents ===
1958 Eastern non-major college football independents records
	Conf.			Overall
Team	W	L	T	W		L		T
Rochester		–		8	–	0	–	0
Hamilton		–		6	–	0	–	1
No. 10 Buffalo		–		8	–	1	–	0
Southern Connecticut State		–		7	–	2	–	0
Carnegie Tech		–		6	–	2	–	0
Northeastern		–		6	–	2	–	0
Hofstra		–		6	–	4	–	0
Rankings from UPI small college poll

1958 Midwestern non-major college football independents records
	Conf.			Overall
Team	W	L	T	W		L		T
Rose Poly		–		8	–	0	–	0
North Park		–		7	–	1	–	0
Carthage		–		7	–	2	–	0
Baldwin–Wallace		–		4	–	4	–	1
Northern Michigan		–		5	–	5	–	0
Xavier		–		5	–	5	–	0
Washington University		–		4	–	4	–	0
St. Norbert		–		3	–	6	–	0
Wabash		–		3	–	6	–	0

1958 Southern non-major college football independents records
	Conf.			Overall
Team	W	L	T	W		L		T
No. 1 Mississippi Southern		–		9	–	0	–	0
Sewanee		–		8	–	0	–	0
Trinity (TX)		–		6	–	3	–	0
Tampa		–		6	–	4	–	0
Abilene Christian		–		5	–	5	–	0
No. 8 Chattanooga		–		5	–	5	–	0
Louisville		–		4	–	4	–	0
Arkansas State		–		4	–	5	–	0
No. 18 Memphis State		–		4	–	5	–	0
Howard (AL)		–		1	–	5	–	1
Washington and Lee		–		1	–	7	–	0
Rankings from UPI small college poll

1958 Western non-major college football independents records
	Conf.			Overall
Team	W	L	T	W		L		T
No. 6 Montana State		–		8	–	1	–	0
Cal Poly Pomona		–		7	–	3	–	0
UC Riverside		–		2	–	3	–	2
Hawaii		–		5	–	7	–	0
Pepperdine		–		1	–	7	–	0
Rankings from UPI small college poll

== Bowl games ==
=== Major bowls ===
Thursday, January 1, 1959

Bowl				
Orange	No. 5 Oklahoma Sooners	21	No. 9 Syracuse Orangemen	6
Sugar	No. 1 LSU Tigers	7	No. 12 Clemson Tigers	0
Cotton	No. 10 TCU Horned Frogs (tie)	0	No. 6 Air Force Falcons (tie)	0
Rose	No. 2 Iowa Hawkeyes	38	No. 16 California Golden Bears	12

=== Other bowls ===
Bowl	Location	Date	Winner	Score	Loser
Sun	El Paso, TX	December 31	Wyoming	14–6	Hardin–Simmons
Gator	Jacksonville, FL	December 27	No. 11 Ole Miss	7–3	No. 14 Florida
Tangerine	Orlando, FL	December 27	East Texas State	26–7	Missouri Valley
Bluegrass	Louisville, KY	December 13	Oklahoma State	15–6	Florida State

Notably, the Tangerine Bowl initially extended a bid to Buffalo. However, when the bowl organizers told the school that its two black players would not be allowed to play, the team unanimously voted to turn down the bid. The Bulls did not appear in a bowl game until a half century later, in 2008.

=== NAIA postseason ===
Semifinals; December 8, 1958
St. Benedict's	14
Northeastern State	19
Gustavus Adolphus	12
Arizona State–Flagstaff	41

Championship; December 20, 1958; Holiday Bowl
Northeastern State	19
Arizona State–Flagstaff	13

== Rankings ==
=== Major college ===
Final polls were released in the first week of December.

AP Poll
Rank	Team	1st	Points
1	LSU	139	1,904
2	Iowa	17	1,459
3	Army	13	1,429
4	Auburn	9	1,398
5	Oklahoma	10	1,200
6	Air Force	2	800
7	Wisconsin	13	797
8	Ohio State	3	571
9	Syracuse	1	340
10	TCU	-	311
11	Ole Miss	2	303
12	Clemson	1	246
13	Purdue	-	196
14	Florida	-	134
15	South Carolina	-	101
16	California	-	78
17	Notre Dame	1	61
18	SMU	-	52
19	Oklahoma State	-	49
20	Rutgers	1	46

UPI poll
Rank	Team	1st	Points
1	LSU	29	331
2	Iowa	4	275
3	Army	1	255
4	Auburn	-	224
5	Oklahoma	-	174
6	Wisconsin	-	170
7	Ohio State	-	117
8	Air Force	1	75
9	TCU	-	74
10	Syracuse	-	64
11	Purdue		54
12	Ole Miss		41
13	Clemson		24
14	Notre Dame		22
15	Florida		9
16	California		8
17	Northwestern		6
18	SMU		2

=== Small college ===
In 1958, United Press International (UPI) conducted a "small college" coaches' poll for the first time. Mississippi Southern, which had beaten NC State and VPI en route to a 9–0 record, was ranked first from start to finish.

United Press International (coaches) final poll
Published on December 4

Rank	School	Record	No. 1 votes	Total points
1	Mississippi Southern	9–0	36	403
2	Miami (OH)	6–3		215
3	Arizona State–Flagstaff	10–0	2	209
4	Northeastern State	9–0	1	205
5	East Texas State	9–1		172
6	Montana State	8–1		148
7	Wheaton (IL)	8–0	1	107
8	Chattanooga	5–5		105
9	St. Benedict's	10–0		92
10	Buffalo	8–1		91

=== NAIA rankings ===
The top teams in the NAIA football rankings were as follows:

1. Northeastern State, 11-0, 180 points
2. Arizona State–Flagstaff, 11-1, 162 points
3. Willamette, 8-1, 116 points
4. St. Benedict's, 10-1, 112 points
5. Missouri Valley, 8-1, 104 points
6. Gustavus Adolphus, 8-1, 100 points
7. East Texas State, 7-1, 98 points
8. Kearney, 9-0, 85 points
9. Middle Tennessee, 8-2, 42 points
10. Lenoir Rhyne, 9-1, 41 points
11. Cal Poly, 9-1
12. Tampa, 6-4
13. Lamar Tech, 6-2
14. Westminster (PA), 6-1-1
15. California (PA), 8-0
16. Chadron State, 8-0
17. Louisiana College, 7-2
18. Stevens Point State, 7-0-1
19. Southern Illinois, 7-2
20. Northwestern State, 5-2

== Award season ==
=== Heisman Trophy voting ===
The Heisman Trophy is given to the year's most outstanding player

Player	School	Position	1st	2nd	3rd	Total
Pete Dawkins	Army	HB	296	195	116	1,394
Randy Duncan	Iowa	QB	194	157	125	1,021
Billy Cannon	LSU	HB	198	140	101	975
Bob White	Ohio State	FB	40	88	69	365
Joe Kapp	California	QB	47	27	32	227
Bill Austin	Rutgers	FB	26	41	37	197
Bob Harrison	Oklahoma	OL	26	37	35	187
Dick Bass	Pacific	HB	14	17	20	96
Don Meredith	SMU	QB	10	12	21	75
Nick Pietrosante	Notre Dame	FB	8	14	18	70

=== All-Americans ===
For the year 1958, the NCAA recognizes six published All-American teams as "official" designations for purposes of its consensus determinations. The following chart identifies the NCAA-recognized consensus All-Americans and displays which first-team designations they received.

Name	Position	School	Number	Official	Other
Billy Cannon	Halfback	LSU	6/6	AFCA, AP, FWAA, NEA, SN, UPI	CP, Time, WC
Randy Duncan	Quarterback	Iowa	6/6	AFCA, AP, FWAA, NEA, SN, UPI	CP, WC
Pete Dawkins	Halfback	Army	6/6	AFCA, AP, FWAA, NEA, SN, UPI	CP, WC
Buddy Dial	End	Rice	5/6	AP, FWAA, NEA, SN, UPI	Time, WC
Ted Bates	Tackle	Oregon State	5/6	AFCA, AP, NEA, SN, UPI	CP, WC
Bob Harrison	Center	Oklahoma	5/6	AP, FWAA, NEA, SN, UPI	CP, WC
Bob White	Fullback	Ohio State	4/6	FWAA, NEA, SN, UPI	CP, Time, WC
John Guzik	Guard	Pittsburgh	4/6	FWAA, NEA, SN, UPI	Time, WC
Zeke Smith	Guard	Auburn	3/6	AP, FWAA, NEA	CP, Time, WC
George Deiderich	Guard	Vanderbilt	3/6	AP, AFCA, FWAA	--
Sam Williams	End	Michigan State	2/6	AFCA, UPI	Time, WC
Brock Strom	Tackle	Air Force	2/6	AP, UPI	WC

=== Other awards ===
- Maxwell Award - Pete Dawkins, Army
- Outland Trophy (best lineman) - Zeke Smith, Auburn
- AFCA Coach of the Year Award - Paul Dietzel, LSU
- FWAA Coach of the Year Award - Paul Dietzel, LSU

== Statistical leaders ==
=== Individual ===
==== Total offense ====
The following players were the individual leaders in total offense during the 1958 season:

Major college

Rank	Player	Team	Games	Plays	Total Yds	PtR
1	Dick Bass	Pacific	10	218	1440	128
2	Randy Duncan	Iowa	9	207	1406	92
3	Buddy Humphrey	Baylor	10	247	1391	70
4	Charlie Milstead	Texas A&M	10	279	1332	72
5	Joe Kapp	California	10	239	1231	60
6	Bill Holsclaw	Virginia Tech	10	230	1227	92
7	Dick Longfellow	West Virginia	10	242	1202	82
8	Don Meredith	SMU	10	190	1192	96
9	Dwight Nichols	Iowa State	10	277	1172	18
10	Jack Cummings	North Carolina	10	154	1148	72

Minor college

Rank	Player	Team	Games	Plays	Total Yds
1	Stan Jackson	Cal Poly Pomona	10	324	2478
2	Gary Campbell	Whittier	9	224	1659
3	Webb	St. Ambrose	8	264	1592
4	Brady	Baldwin-Wallace	9	248	1534
5	Gideon	Trinity	9	209	1520

==== Passing ====
The following players were the individual leaders in pass completions during the 1958 season:

Major college

Rank	Player	Team	Games	Compl.	Att.	Pct. Compl.	Yds.	Int.	TDs
1	Buddy Humphrey	Baylor	10	112	195	.574	1316	8	7
2	Ralph Hunsaker	Arizona	10	106	191	.555	1129	13	5
3	Randy Duncan	Iowa	9	101	172	.587	1347	9	11
4	Rich Mayo	Air Force	10	98	174	.563	1019	6	11
5	Charlie Milstead	Texas A&M	10	88	167	.527	1135	11	5
6	Dick Longfellow	West Virginia	10	79	156	.506	943	12	6
7	Bob Nicolet	Stanford	10	77	146	.527	724	5	3
8	Dick Norman	Stanford	10	76	133	.571	717	7	3
9	Arnold Dempsey	Virginia	10	74	152	.487	697	11	2
10	Jack Lee	Cincinnati	10	71	130	.546	951	11	5

Minor college

Rank	Player	Team	Games	Compl.	Att.	Pct. Compl.	Yds.	Int.	TDs
1	Stan Jackson	Cal Poly Pomona	10	123	256	.480	1994	14	16
2	Alvaro	College of Idaho	10	112	225	.498	1485	17	9
3	Newhouse	St. Norbert	9	104	211	.493	1310	18	13
4	Webb	St. Ambrose	8	100	202	.495	1494	7	10
5	Johnson	New Mexico A&M	10	97	179	.542	1184	11	9
6	Brady	Baldwin-Wallace	9	89	183	.486	1490	15	16
9	Campbell	Whittier	9	87	139	.626	1237	7	13

==== Rushing ====
The following players were the individual leaders in rushing yards during the 1958 season:
Major college

Rank	Player	Team	Games	Yds	Rushes	Avg
1	Dick Bass	Pacific	10	1361	205	6.63
2	Bob White	Ohio State	9	859	218	3.94
3	Dwight Nichols	Iowa State	10	815	220	3.70
4	Pete Hart	Hardin-Simmons	10	785	163	4.81
5	Bill Austin	Rutgers	9	747	145	5.15
6	Jake Crouthamel	Dartmouth	9	722	123	5.86
7	Weldon Jackson	BYU	10	698	101	6.91
8	Billy Cannon	LSU	10	686	115	5.96
9	Larry Hickman	Baylor	10	670	151	4.43
10	Johnny Saunders	South Carolina	10	653	128	5.10

Minor college

Rank	Player	Team	Games	Yds	Rushes	Avg
1	Dale Mills	Northeast Missouri State	9	186	1358	7.30
2	Brad Hustad	Luther	9	206	1354	6.57
3	Elbert Dubenion	Bluffton	9	151	1290	8.54
4	George Dixon	Bridgeport	9	155	1106	7.14
5	Ed Meador	Arkansas Tech	9	135	1096	8.12
14	Finder	St. Benedict's	10	100	917	9.17

==== Scoring ====
The following players were the individual leaders in scoring during the 1958 season:

Major college

Rank	Player	Team	Pts	TD	PAT	FG
1	Dick Bass	Pacific	116	18	8	0
2	Bill Austin	Rutgers	106	16	10	0
3	Ron Burton	Northwestern	76	12	4	0
4	Billy Cannon	LSU	74	11	8	0
5	Frank Finney	Brown	74	10	14	0
6	Pete Dawkins	Army	74	12	2	0
7	Bob White	Ohio State	72	12	0	0
8	Leon Burton	Arizona State	70	11	4	0
9	Calvin Bird	Kentucky	65	10	5	0
10	Bob Simms	Rutgers	64	9	10	0

Minor college

Rank	Player	Team	Pts	TD	PAT	FG
1	Carl Herakovich	Rose Poly	168	25	18	0
2	Corky Bridges	Central Washington	148	21	22	0
3	Bill Shockley	West Chester	132	15	42	0
4	Dale Mills	Northeast Missouri	122	20	2	0
5	Claire Boroff	Kearney State	121	14	37	0

=== Team ===
==== Total offense ====
The following teams were the leaders in total offense during the 1958 season:

Major college

Rank	Team	Games played	Total plays	Yards gained	Yards per game
1	Iowa	9	649	3653	405.9
2	Pacific	10	657	3804	380.4
3	Arizona State	10	694	3795	379.5
4	Army	9	630	3380	375.6
5	Notre Dame	10	710	3697	369.7
6	Air Force	10	732	3605	360.5
7	Oklahoma	10	762	3517	351.7
8	Baylor	10	715	3356	335.6
9	Brown	9	622	3019	335.4
10	West Virginia	10	720	3319	331.9

==== Rushing offense ====
The following teams were the leaders in rushing offense during the 1958 season:

Major college

Rank	Team	Yards per game
1	Pacific	259.6
2	Oklahoma	257.4
3	Arizona State	253.9
4	BYU	249.7
5	Colorado	249.5

==== Passing offense ====
The following teams were the leaders in passing offense during the 1958 season:

Major college

Rank	Team	Yards per game
1	Army	172.2
2	Iowa	170.0
3	San Jose State	169.8
4	Baylor	168.7
5	SMU	165.2

==== Total defense ====
The following teams were the leaders in total defense during the 1958 season:

Major college

Rank	Team	Games played	Total plays	Yards gained	Yards per game
1	Auburn	10	521	1575	157.5
2	Purdue	9	485	1590	176.7
3	Army	9	561	1643	182.6
4	Harvard	9	512	1720	191.1
5	LSU	10	624	1934	193.4
6	Boston College	10	558	1942	194.2
7	Pittsburgh	10	569	1961	196.1
8	North Texas State	10	542	2017	201.7
9	Georgia Tech	10	552	2018	201.8
10	Tulsa	10	595	2030	203.0

==== Rushing defense ====
The following teams were the leaders in rushing defense during the 1958 season:

Major college

Rank	Team	Yards per game
1	Auburn	79.6
2	Tulsa	82.5
3	Pittsburgh	91.3
4	Army	93.0
5	Syracuse	94.3

==== Passing defense ====
The following teams were the leaders in passing defense during the 1958 season:

Major college

Rank	Team	Yards per game
1	Iowa State	39.0
2	Brown	44.8
3	Georgia Tech	57.1
4	Harvard	58.4
5	Colorado	59.0

== See also ==
- 1958 College Football All-America Team
