= 1958 small college football rankings =

- Selector: UPI
- No. 1: Mississippi Southern
- Small college football rankings (AP, UPI)
- 1959»

The 1958 small college football rankings are rankings of college football teams representing smaller college and university teams during the 1958 college football season. The rankings were prepared and published the United Press International (UPI). It was the first year that the UPI compiled small-college rankings. The Associated Press (AP) did not begin publishing small-college rankings until 1960.

The UPI's small-college rankings for 1957 were based on voting by the UPI's board of coaches. Mississippi Southern compiled a perfect 9–0 record and was ranked No. 1 in the final UPI small-college rankings. The Miami Redskins were ranked second.

== Legend ==
	Increase in ranking
	Decrease in ranking
	Not ranked previous week
(#–#)	Win–loss record
(Italics)	Number of first place votes
т	Tied with team above or below also with this symbol

== UPI coaches poll ==
	Week 1 Sept 25	Week 2 Oct 2	Week 3 Oct 9	Week 4 Oct 16	Week 5 Oct 23	Week 6 Oct 30	Week 7 Nov 6	Week 8 Nov 13	Week 9 Nov 20	Week 10 Nov 28	Week 11 Dec 4	
1.	Mississippi Southern (9)	Mississippi Southern (2–0) (12)	Mississippi Southern (3–0) (18)	Mississippi Southern (4–0) (23)	Mississippi Southern (4–0) (25)	Mississippi Southern (5–0) (34)	Mississippi Southern (6–0) (31)	Mississippi Southern (7–0) (34)	Mississippi Southern (8–0) (33)	Mississippi Southern (8–0) (32)	Mississippi Southern (9–0) (36)	1.
2.	Connecticut (3)	Ohio (2–0) (2)	East Texas State (3–0) (2)	Connecticut (3–1) (1)	Connecticut (4–1) (4)	Montana State (6–0)	Montana State (7–0) (1)	Miami (OH) (5–2) (1)	Miami (OH) (5–2) (1)	Miami (OH) (6–2) (1)	Miami (OH) (6–3)	2.
3.	Idaho State (4)	Idaho State (1–0) (3)	Idaho State (2–0) (2)	Chattanooga (3–1)	Bowling Green (5–0) (2)	Miami (OH) (3–2)	Miami (OH) (4–2) (2)	Chattanooga (5–3) (1)	Arizona State College (9–0) (2)	Northeastern State (9–0) (1)	Arizona State College (10–0) (2)	3.
4.	Chattanooga (1)	Chattanooga (2–0) (2)	Connecticut (2–1) (3)	Idaho State (3–0)	Chattanooga (4–1)	East Texas State (5–1)	Northeastern State (8–0) (5)	East Texas State (7–1)	Northeastern State (9–0) (1)	East Texas State (9–1) (1)	Northeastern State (9–0) (1)	4.
5.	Ohio (2) (Note: In the actual printed polls, Ohio was listed as Ohio University on 9/25, 10/2, 10/9, & 10/16)	Miami (OH) (1–0) (4)	Chattanooga (2–1) (2)	Bowling Green (4–0) (4)	Montana State (5–0)	Northeastern State (7–0) (1)	East Texas State (6–1)	Northeastern State (8–0)	Montana State (8–1)	Arizona State College (10–0) (2)	East Texas State (9–1)	5.
6.	Wittenberg (1)	Lehigh (1–0) (2)	Kent State (3–0) (1)	Miami (OH) (2–1) (1)	Miami (OH) (3–1)	Bowling Green (5–1) (1)	Arizona State College (8–0) (1)	Arizona State College (8–0) (3)	East Texas State (8–1)	Montana State (8–1)	Montana State (8–1)	6.
7.	Hillsdale (1)	East Texas State (2–0)	Bowling Green (3–0) (3)	Montana State (4–0)	Butler (5–0)	Wheaton (IL) (6–0) (1)	Wheaton (IL) (7–0)	Montana State (7–1) (1)	Chattanooga (5–4)	Chattanooga (5–4)	Wheaton (IL) (8–0) (1)	7.
8.	Middle Tennessee (2) т	Connecticut (1–1)	Butler (3–0) (1)	East Texas State (3–1)	Central Michigan (6–0)	Chattanooga (4–2)	St. Benedict's (8–0)	Wheaton (IL) (8–0) (1)	Wheaton (IL) (8–0) (1)	Wheaton (IL) (8–0) (1)	Chattanooga (5–5)	8.
9.	East Texas State (1) т	Montana State (2–0)	Central Michigan (4–0) (2)	Butler (4–0) (1)	Northeastern State (6–0)	Arizona State College (7–0) (3)	Connecticut (5–2)	St. Benedict's (9–0) (1)	St. Benedict's (10–0) (1)	Buffalo (8–1) (2) т	St. Benedict's	9.
10.	Ripon т	Butler (2–0) (2)	Montana State (3–0)	Cal Poly (4–0)	Wheaton (IL) (5–0)	Connecticut (4–2) (1)	Willamette (7–0)	Connecticut (6–2)	Connecticut (7–2)	St. Benedict's (10–0) т	Buffalo (8–1) (2)	10.
11.	Cal Poly (Note: In the actual printed polls, Cal Poly was listed as Cal Poly at San Luis Obispo on 9/25, 10/2, 10/9, 10/16, 10/23, 10/30, 11/6, 11/13, 11/19, & 11/28)	Cal Poly (2)	Ohio (1)	Middle Tennessee	East Texas State	St. Benedict's (1)	Chattanooga	Kearney State	Buffalo (2)	Middle Tennessee	Middle Tennessee (1)	11.
12.	Bowling Green	Middle Tennessee	Cal Poly (1)	Central Michigan (2)	St. Benedict's	Memphis State	Kent State	Bowling Green	Cal Poly	Cal Poly т	Connecticut	12.
13.	Maine	Central Michigan (1)	Miami (OH) т	Ohio	Amherst	Amherst (1)	Memphis State т	Cal Poly	Middle Tennessee	Connecticut т	Gustavus Adolphus	13.
14.	Montana State	Kent State	Delaware т	Northeastern State (2)	Idaho State	Delaware	Kearney State т	Willamette	Kearney	Bowling Green	Bowling Green	14.
15.	Delaware	Juniata т	Lehigh т	Wheaton (IL) (2) т	Arizona State College (Note: In the actual printed polls, Arizona State College was listed as Arizona (Flagstaff) State on 10/30, 11/6, 11/13, & 11/19)	Willamette	Buffalo	Middle Tennessee	Rochester т	Gustavus Adolphus	Cal Poly	15.
16.	Lenoir–Rhyne т	Bowling Green т	Middle Tennessee	Maine т	Willamette	Central Michigan	Bowling Green	Buffalo	Bowling Green т	Kearney	Wittenberg т	16.
17.	Butler т	Memphis State т	Iowa State Teachers	Juniata (1)	Lamar Tech	Lafayette	Lafayette	Rochester	Missouri Valley	West Chester	West Chester т	17.
18.	Miami (OH) т	Maine т	Florida A&M	St. Benedict's	Cal Poly	Cal Poly	Cal Poly	Gustavus Adolphus т	Sewanee	Memphis State	Memphis State	18.
19.	Pittsburg State т (Note: In the actual printed polls, Pittsburg State was listed as Pittsburg (Kansas) on 9/25)	Wittenberg т	Northeastern State	Amherst (1)	Juniata	Kent State	West Chester	Memphis State т	West Chester т	Sewanee т	Rochester	19.
20.	Northeastern State (Note: In the actual printed polls, Northeastern State was listed as Northeastern Oklahoma on 9/25, 10/9, 10/30, 11/6, 11/13, 11/19, 11/28 & 12/4)	Hofstra т	Memphis State т	Louisiana Tech т	Middle Tennessee	Buffalo (1) т	Missouri Valley	Missouri Valley	Memphis State т	Wittenberg т	Kearney	20.
21.		Louisville т	Wittenberg т	Kent State т		Williams т						21.
	Week 1 Sept 25	Week 2 Oct 2	Week 3 Oct 9	Week 4 Oct 16	Week 5 Oct 23	Week 6 Oct 30	Week 7 Nov 6	Week 8 Nov 13	Week 9 Nov 20	Week 10 Nov 28	Week 11 Dec 4	
		Dropped: 7 Hillsdale; 10 Ripon; 15 Delaware; 16 Lenoir–Rhyne; 19 Pittsburg State; 20 Northeastern State	Dropped: 15 Juniata; 18 Maine; 20 Hofstra; 21 Louisville	Dropped: 14 Delaware; 15 Lehigh; 17 Iowa State Teachers; 18 Florida A&M; 20 Memphis State; 20 Wittenberg	Dropped: 13 Ohio; 16 Maine; 20 Louisiana Tech; 20 Kent State	Dropped: 7 Butler; 14 Idaho State; 17 Lamar Tech; 19 Juniata; 20 Middle Tennessee	Dropped: 13 Amherst; 14 Delaware; 16 Central Michigan; 20 Williams	Dropped: 12 Kent State; 17 Lafayette; 19 West Chester State	Dropped: 14 Willamette; 18 Gustavus Adolphus	Dropped: 15 Rochester; 17 Missouri Valley	Dropped: 19 Sewanee	

== HBCU rankings ==
The Pittsburgh Courier, a leading African American newspaper, ranked the top 1958 teams from historically black colleges and universities in an era when college football was often racially segregated.

The rankings were published on December 20:

- 1. Prairie View A&M (10–0–1)
- 2. Southern (8–2)
- 3. Florida A&M (7–2)
- 4. North Carolina A&T (7–2)
- 5. Lincoln (MO) (8–1)
- 6. South Carolina State (7–2)
- 7. North Carolina College (7–2)
- 8. Jackson State (6–2–1)
- 9. Bishop (9–1)
- 10. Grambling (6–3)
- 11. Texas Southern (5–5)
- 12. Texas College (5–4)
- 13. Alabama State (6–2)
- 14. Tennessee A&I (4–4)
- 15. Morgan State (5–3)

The Associated Negro Press also published rankings on December 27:

- 1. Prairie View A&M (10–0–1)
- 2. Southern (8–2)
- 3. Florida A&M (7–2)
- 4. Lincoln (MO) (8–1)
- 5. Texas Southern (5–5)
- 6. Grambling (6–3)
- 7. Jackson State (6–2–1)
- 8. Tennessee A&I (4–4)
- 9. North Carolina A&T (7–2)
- 10. North Carolina College (7–2)
- 11. South Carolina State (7–2)
- 12. Wiley (5–5)
- 13. Morgan State (5–3)
