= 1958 Ivy League football season =

- League: NCAA University Division
- Sport: Football
- Duration: September 27, 1958 – November 27, 1958
- Teams: 8

1959 NFL Draft
- Top draft pick: None

Regular season
- Champions: Dartmouth

Football seasons
- ← 1957 1959 →

1958 Ivy League football standings
	Conf.					Overall
Team	W		L		T	W		L		T
Dartmouth $	6	–	1	–	0	7	–	2	–	0
Cornell	5	–	2	–	0	6	–	3	–	0
Princeton	5	–	2	–	0	6	–	3	–	0
Brown	4	–	3	–	0	6	–	3	–	0
Penn	4	–	3	–	0	4	–	5	–	0
Harvard	3	–	4	–	0	4	–	5	–	0
Columbia	1	–	6	–	0	1	–	8	–	0
Yale	0	–	7	–	0	2	–	7	–	0
$ – Conference champion

The 1958 Ivy League football season was the third season of college football play for the Ivy League and was part of the 1958 college football season. The season began on September 27, 1958, and ended on November 27, 1958. Ivy League teams were 7–7 against non-conference opponents and Dartmouth won the conference championship.

== Season overview ==
Conf. Rank	Team	Head coach	AP final	AP high	Overall record	Conf. record	PPG	PAG
1	Dartmouth	Bob Blackman	NR	NR	7–2	6–1	20.2	9.2
2 (tie)	Cornell	George K. James	NR	NR	6–3	5–2	16.3	15.0
2 (tie)	Princeton	Dick Colman	NR	NR	6–3	5–2	24.1	18.2
4 (tie)	Brown	Alva Kelley	NR	NR	6–3	4–3	23.4	15.6
4 (tie)	Penn	Steve Sebo	NR	NR	4–5	4–3	17.0	19.7
6	Harvard	John Yovicsin	NR	NR	4–5	3–4	16.6	11.0
7	Columbia	Aldo Donelli	NR	NR	1–8	1–6	3.9	32.3
8	Yale	Jordan Olivar	NR	NR	2–7	0–7	10.2	22.6

== Schedule ==
Index to colors and formatting
Ivy League member won
Ivy League member lost
Ivy League teams in **bold**

=== Week 1 ===
Date	Visiting team	Home team	Site	Result
September 27	Lafayette	Dartmouth	Memorial Field • Hanover, NH	**W** 20–0
September 27	Colgate	Cornell	Schoellkopf Field • Ithaca, NY	**W** 13–0
September 27	Rutgers	Princeton	Palmer Stadium • Princeton, NJ	**L** 0–28
September 27	**Brown**	Columbia	Baker Field • New York City, NY	**BROWN** 22–0
September 27	Penn State	Penn	Franklin Field • Philadelphia, PA	**L** 0–43
September 27	Buffalo	Harvard	Harvard Stadium • Boston, MA	**L** 3–6
September 27	Connecticut	Yale	Yale Bowl • New Haven, CT	**W** 8–6

=== Week 2 ===
Date	Visiting team	Home team	Site	Result
October 4	**Penn**	**Dartmouth**	Memorial Field • Hanover, NH	**DART** 13–12
October 4	**Harvard**	**Cornell**	Schoellkopf Field • Ithaca, NY	**COR** 21–14
October 4	**Columbia**	**Princeton**	Palmer Stadium • Princeton, NJ	**PRIN** 43–8
October 4	**Yale**	**Brown**	Brown Stadium • Providence, RI	**BROWN** 35–29

=== Week 3 ===
Date	Visiting team	Home team	Site	Result
October 11	**Dartmouth**	**Brown**	Brown Stadium • Providence, RI	**DART** 20–0
October 11	**Cornell**	Syracuse	Archbold Stadium • Syracuse, NY	**L** 0–55
October 11	**Princeton**	**Penn**	Franklin Field • Philadelphia, PA	**PRIN** 20–14
October 11	Lehigh	**Harvard**	Harvard Stadium • Boston, MA	**W** 20–0
October 11	**Yale**	**Columbia**	Baker Field • New York City, NY	**COL** 13–0

=== Week 4 ===
Date	Visiting team	Home team	Site	Result
October 18	Holy Cross	**Dartmouth**	Memorial Field • Hanover, NH	**L** 8–14
October 18	**Cornell**	**Yale**	Yale Bowl • New Haven, CT	**COR** 12–7
October 18	Colgate	**Princeton**	Palmer Stadium • Princeton, NJ	**PRIN** 40–13
October 18	**Brown**	**Penn**	Franklin Field • Philadelphia, PA	**PENN** 21–20
October 18	**Harvard**	**Columbia**	Baker Field • New York City, NY	**HAR** 26–0

=== Week 5 ===
Date	Visiting team	Home team	Site	Result
October 25	**Dartmouth**	Harvard	Harvard Stadium • Boston, MA	**HAR** 16–8
October 25	**Princeton**	Cornell	Schoellkopf Field • Ithaca, NY	**COR** 34–8
October 25	Rhode Island	Brown	Brown Stadium • Providence, RI	**W** 47–6
October 25	#18 Navy	Penn	Franklin Field • Philadelphia, PA	**L** 8–50
October 25	Buffalo	Columbia	Baker Field • New York City, NY	**L** 14–34
October 25	Colgate	Yale	Yale Bowl • New Haven, CT	**W** 14–7

=== Week 6 ===
Date	Visiting team	Home team	Site	Result
November 1	**Dartmouth**	**Yale**	Yale Bowl • New Haven, CT	**DART** 22–14
November 1	**Cornell**	**Columbia**	Baker Field • New York City, NY	**COR** 25–0
November 1	**Brown**	**Princeton**	Palmer Stadium • Princeton, NJ	**PRIN** 28–18
November 1	**Penn**	**Harvard**	Harvard Stadium • Boston, MA	**PENN** 19–6

=== Week 7 ===
Date	Visiting team	Home team	Site	Result
November 8	**Columbia**	**Dartmouth**	Memorial Field • Hanover, NH	**DART** 38–0
November 8	**Cornell**	**Brown**	Brown Stadium • Providence, RI	**BROWN** 12–8
November 8	**Harvard**	**Princeton**	Palmer Stadium • Princeton, NJ	**PRIN** 16–14
November 8	**Penn**	**Yale**	Yale Bowl • New Haven, CT	**PENN** 30–6

=== Week 8 ===
Date	Visiting team	Home team	Site	Result
November 15	**Dartmouth**	**Cornell**	Schoellkopf Field • Ithaca, NY	**DART** 32–15
November 15	**Princeton**	**Yale**	Yale Bowl • New Haven, CT	**PRIN** 50–14
November 15	**Brown**	**Harvard**	Harvard Stadium • Boston, MA	**BROWN** 29–22
November 15	**Columbia**	**Penn**	Franklin Field • Philadelphia, PA	**PENN** 42–0

=== Week 9 ===
Date	Visiting team	Home team	Site	Result
November 22	**Dartmouth**	**Princeton**	Palmer Stadium • Princeton, NJ	**DART** 21–12
November 22	**Yale**	**Harvard**	Harvard Stadium • Boston, MA	**HAR** 28–0
November 22	Rutgers	**Columbia**	Baker Field • New York City, NY	**L** 0–61
November 27	**Cornell**	**Penn**	Franklin Field • Philadelphia, PA	**COR** 19–7
November 27	Colgate	**Brown**	Brown Stadium • Providence, RI	**W** 28–6
