= 1958 Lafayette Leopards football team =

American college football season

1958 Lafayette Leopards football
- Conference: Middle Atlantic Conference
- University Division
- Record: 5–3–1 (5–1–1 MAC)
- Head coach: James McConlogue (1st season)
- Captain: Donald Dilly
- Home stadium: Fisher Field

1958 Middle Atlantic Conference football standings
	Conf.					Overall
Team	W		L		T	W		L		T
University Division
No. 20 Rutgers x	4	–	0	–	0	8	–	1	–	0
Lafayette	5	–	1	–	1	5	–	3	–	1
Gettysburg	3	–	1	–	1	7	–	1	–	1
Lehigh	2	–	1	–	2	3	–	3	–	3
Delaware	2	–	3	–	0	5	–	3	–	0
Bucknell	1	–	5	–	0	1	–	8	–	0
Temple	0	–	5	–	0	0	–	8	–	0
Muhlenberg *	1	–	2	–	0	4	–	4	–	0
Northern College Division
Juniata x	6	–	0	–	0	7	–	0	–	1
Lycoming	4	–	1	–	0	7	–	1	–	0
Lebanon Valley	3	–	1	–	1	4	–	3	–	1
Susquehanna	3	–	2	–	0	3	–	4	–	0
Moravian	3	–	3	–	0	4	–	4	–	0
Wagner	3	–	3	–	0	3	–	5	–	0
Dickinson	3	–	4	–	0	4	–	4	–	0
Albright	2	–	4	–	1	2	–	6	–	1
Wilkes	1	–	7	–	0	1	–	8	–	0
Scranton *	2	–	2	–	0	5	–	3	–	0
Southern College Division
Pennsylvania Military x	7	–	1	–	0	7	–	2	–	0
Johns Hopkins	5	–	1	–	0	5	–	3	–	0
Haverford	4	–	2	–	0	4	–	3	–	0
Western Maryland	1	–	4	–	0	3	–	6	–	0
Swarthmore	1	–	4	–	0	1	–	7	–	0
Drexel	1	–	5	–	0	1	–	7	–	0
Ursinus	0	–	8	–	0	0	–	8	–	0
West Chester *	1	–	0	–	0	9	–	1	–	0
Franklin & Marshall *	3	–	1	–	0	5	–	4	–	0
x – Division champion/co-champions; * – Ineligible for championship due to insufficient conference games; Rankings from AP Poll

The 1958 Lafayette Leopards football team was an American football team that represented Lafayette College during the 1958 college football season. Lafayette finished second in the Middle Atlantic Conference, University Division, and tied for second in the Middle Three Conference. In their first year under head coach James McConlogue, the Leopards compiled a 5–3–1 record. Donald Dilly was the team captain.

In the first year of football competition for the Middle Atlantic Conference, Lafayette finished second in the University Division with a record of 5–1–1 against conference opponents. The Leopards went 0–1–1 against the Middle Three, losing to Rutgers and tying Lehigh.

In the final two weeks of their five-game winning streak, the Leopards were ranked No. 17 in the UPI small college poll. They dropped out of the poll after losing to Rutgers and remained unranked through the end of the season.

Lafayette played home games at Fisher Field on College Hill in Easton, Pennsylvania.

== Schedule ==
Date	Opponent	Site	Result	Attendance	Source
September 27	at Dartmouth*	Memorial Field; Hanover, NH	L 0–20	5,000	
October 4	Muhlenberg	Fisher Field; Easton, PA	W 27–14	6,000–10,000	
October 11	at No. 13 Delaware	Delaware Stadium; Newark, DE	W 7–6	5,181	
October 18	Temple	Fisher Field; Easton, PA	W 35–0	8,000	
October 25	at Bucknell	Memorial Stadium; Lewisburg, PA	W 34–6	5,800–6,000	
November 1	Gettysburg	Fisher Field; Easton, PA	W 19–13	8,500	
November 8	at Rutgers	Rutgers Stadium; Piscataway, NJ	L 0–18	21,000	
November 15	Tufts*	Ellis Oval; Somerville, MA	L 8–16	4,700	
November 22	Lehigh	Fisher Field; Easton, PA (The Rivalry)	T 14–14	19,000–20,000	
*Non-conference game; Rankings from UPI Poll released prior to the game
