= 1958 Columbia Lions football team =

American college football season

1958 Columbia Lions football
- Conference: Ivy League
- Record: 1–8 (1–6 Ivy)
- Head coach: Aldo Donelli (2nd season)
- Captain: Coy Gobble
- Home stadium: Baker Field

1958 Ivy League football standings
	Conf.					Overall
Team	W		L		T	W		L		T
Dartmouth $	6	–	1	–	0	7	–	2	–	0
Cornell	5	–	2	–	0	6	–	3	–	0
Princeton	5	–	2	–	0	6	–	3	–	0
Brown	4	–	3	–	0	6	–	3	–	0
Penn	4	–	3	–	0	4	–	5	–	0
Harvard	3	–	4	–	0	4	–	5	–	0
Columbia	1	–	6	–	0	1	–	8	–	0
Yale	0	–	7	–	0	2	–	7	–	0
$ – Conference champion

The 1958 Columbia Lions football team was an American football team that represented Columbia University as a member of the Ivy League during the 1958 college football season.

In their second season under head coach Aldo "Buff" Donelli, the Lions compiled a 1–8 record and were outscored 291 to 35. Coy Gobble was the team captain.

The Lions' 1–6 conference record placed seventh in the Ivy League. Columbia was outscored 196 to 21 by Ivy opponents.

Columbia played its home games at Baker Field in Upper Manhattan, in New York City.

== Schedule ==
Date	Opponent	Site	Result	Attendance	Source
September 27	Brown	Baker Field; New York, NY	L 0–22	8,500	
October 4	at Princeton	Palmer Stadium; Princeton, NJ	L 8–43	16,500	
October 11	Yale	Baker Field; New York, NY	W 13–0	17,000	
October 18	Harvard^{†}	Baker Field; New York, NY	L 0–26	23,000	
October 25	at Buffalo*	Civic Stadium; Buffalo, NY	L 14–34	13,074	
November 1	Cornell	Baker Field; New York, NY (rivalry)	L 0–25	17,500	
November 8	at Dartmouth	Memorial Field; Hanover, NH	L 0–38	9,000	
November 15	at Penn	Franklin Field; Philadelphia, PA	L 0–42	17,817	
November 22	at Rutgers*	Rutgers Stadium; Piscataway, NJ	L 0–61	20,000	
*Non-conference game; ^{†}Homecoming
