= 1958 Lehigh Engineers football team =

American college football season

1958 Lehigh Engineers football
- Conference: Middle Atlantic Conference
- University Division
- Record: 3–3–3 (2–1–2 MAC)
- Head coach: Bill Leckonby (13th season)
- Captain: Charles Burger
- Home stadium: Taylor Stadium

1958 Middle Atlantic Conference football standings
| | Conf. | | | | | Overall |
| Team | W | | L | | T | W | | L | | T |
|---|---|---|---|---|---|---|---|---|---|---|
University Division
| No. 20 Rutgers x | 4 | – | 0 | – | 0 | 8 | – | 1 | – | 0 |
| Lafayette | 5 | – | 1 | – | 1 | 5 | – | 3 | – | 1 |
| Gettysburg | 3 | – | 1 | – | 1 | 7 | – | 1 | – | 1 |
| Lehigh | 2 | – | 1 | – | 2 | 3 | – | 3 | – | 3 |
| Delaware | 2 | – | 3 | – | 0 | 5 | – | 3 | – | 0 |
| Bucknell | 1 | – | 5 | – | 0 | 1 | – | 8 | – | 0 |
| Temple | 0 | – | 5 | – | 0 | 0 | – | 8 | – | 0 |
| Muhlenberg * | 1 | – | 2 | – | 0 | 4 | – | 4 | – | 0 |
Northern College Division
| Juniata x | 6 | – | 0 | – | 0 | 7 | – | 0 | – | 1 |
| Lycoming | 4 | – | 1 | – | 0 | 7 | – | 1 | – | 0 |
| Lebanon Valley | 3 | – | 1 | – | 1 | 4 | – | 3 | – | 1 |
| Susquehanna | 3 | – | 2 | – | 0 | 3 | – | 4 | – | 0 |
| Moravian | 3 | – | 3 | – | 0 | 4 | – | 4 | – | 0 |
| Wagner | 3 | – | 3 | – | 0 | 3 | – | 5 | – | 0 |
| Dickinson | 3 | – | 4 | – | 0 | 4 | – | 4 | – | 0 |
| Albright | 2 | – | 4 | – | 1 | 2 | – | 6 | – | 1 |
| Wilkes | 1 | – | 7 | – | 0 | 1 | – | 8 | – | 0 |
| Scranton * | 2 | – | 2 | – | 0 | 5 | – | 3 | – | 0 |
Southern College Division
| Pennsylvania Military x | 7 | – | 1 | – | 0 | 7 | – | 2 | – | 0 |
| Johns Hopkins | 5 | – | 1 | – | 0 | 5 | – | 3 | – | 0 |
| Haverford | 4 | – | 2 | – | 0 | 4 | – | 3 | – | 0 |
| Western Maryland | 1 | – | 4 | – | 0 | 3 | – | 6 | – | 0 |
| Swarthmore | 1 | – | 4 | – | 0 | 1 | – | 7 | – | 0 |
| Drexel | 1 | – | 5 | – | 0 | 1 | – | 7 | – | 0 |
| Ursinus | 0 | – | 8 | – | 0 | 0 | – | 8 | – | 0 |
| West Chester * | 1 | – | 0 | – | 0 | 9 | – | 1 | – | 0 |
| Franklin & Marshall * | 3 | – | 1 | – | 0 | 5 | – | 4 | – | 0 |
x – Division champion/co-champions; * – Ineligible for championship due to insufficient conference games; Rankings from AP Poll

The 1958 Lehigh Engineers football team was an American football team that represented Lehigh University during the 1958 college football season. Lehigh finished fourth in the Middle Atlantic Conference, University Division, and tied for second in the Middle Three Conference.

In their 13th year under head coach Bill Leckonby, the Engineers compiled a 3–3–3 record. Charles Burger was the team captain.

In the first year of football competition for the Middle Atlantic Conference, Lehigh finished fourth in the University Division with a record of 2–1–2 against conference opponents. The Engineers went 0–1–1 against the Middle Three, losing to Rutgers and tying Lafayette.

Following their defeat of a ranked Delaware team in the season's opening game, Lehigh entered the UPI small college poll at No. 6 in the first week of October. The tie result at Gettysburg dropped them to No. 13 the following week, and the loss to Harvard pushed them out of the top 20. The Engineers remained unranked through the end of the season.

Lehigh played its home games at Taylor Stadium on the university campus in Bethlehem, Pennsylvania.

== Schedule ==
| Date | Opponent | Site | Result | Attendance | Source |
|---|---|---|---|---|---|
| September 27 | No. 15 Delaware | Taylor Stadium; Bethlehem, PA (rivalry) | W 8–7 | 5,000–6,200 | |
| October 4 | at Gettysburg | Musselman Stadium; Gettysburg, PA | T 14–14 | 4,000 | |
| October 11 | at Harvard* | Harvard Stadium; Boston, MA | L 0–20 | 9,000 | |
| October 18 | Western Reserve* | Taylor Stadium; Bethlehem, PA | W 47–0 | 10,800 | |
| October 25 | Rutgers | Taylor Stadium; Bethlehem, PA | L 13–44 | 8,500 | |
| November 1 | at Bucknell | Memorial Stadium; Lewisburg, PA | W 35–14 | 5,200 | |
| November 8 | at VMI* | Municipal Stadium; Lynchburg, VA | T 7–7 | 6,000 | |
| November 15 | Buffalo* | Taylor Stadium; Bethlehem, PA | L 26–34 | 5,200 | |
| November 22 | at Lafayette | Fisher Field; Easton, PA (The Rivalry) | T 14–14 | 19,000–20,000 | |
*Non-conference game; Rankings from UPI Poll released prior to the game
