= 1958 Boston University Terriers football team =

American college football season

1958 Boston University Terriers football
- Conference: Independent
- Record: 4–5
- Head coach: Steve Sinko (2nd season)
- Home stadium: Boston University Field

1958 Eastern major college football independents records
	Conf.			Overall
Team	W	L	T	W		L		T
No. 3 Army		–		8	–	0	–	1
No. 9 Syracuse		–		8	–	2	–	0
Boston College		–		7	–	3	–	0
Holy Cross		–		6	–	3	–	0
Penn State		–		6	–	3	–	1
Villanova		–		6	–	4	–	0
Pittsburgh		–		5	–	4	–	1
Boston University		–		4	–	5	–	0
Colgate		–		1	–	8	–	0
Rankings from AP poll

The 1958 Boston University Terriers football team was an American football team that represented Boston University as an independent during the 1958 college football season. In its second season under head coach Steve Sinko, the team compiled a 4–5 record and was outscored by a total of 211 to 168.

== Schedule ==
Date	Opponent	Site	Result	Attendance	Source
September 27	at UMass	Alumni Field; Amherst, MA	W 28–14		
October 4	No. 15 Navy	Boston University Field; Boston, MA	L 14–28	20,000	
October 11	at West Virginia	Mountaineer Field; Morgantown, WV	W 36–30	20,000	
October 18	Penn State	Boston University Field; Boston, MA	L 0–34	11,000	
October 25	at Holy Cross	Fitton Field; Worcester, MA	L 8–16	10,000	
November 1	William & Mary	Boston University Field; Boston, MA	W 33–7	5,500	
November 7	No. 12 Syracuse	Boston University Field; Boston, MA	L 0–42	16,500	
November 15	at Boston College	Alumni Stadium; Chestnut Hill, MA (rivalry)	L 13–18	22,000	
November 22	at Connecticut	Memorial Stadium; Storrs, CT	W 36–22	10,139	
Rankings from Coaches' Poll released prior to the game; Source:
