= 1958 Temple Owls football team =

American college football season

1958 Temple Owls football
- Conference: Middle Atlantic Conference
- University Division
- Record: 0–8 (0–5 MAC)
- Head coach: Peter P. Stevens (3rd season)
- Home stadium: Temple Stadium

1958 Middle Atlantic Conference football standings
	Conf.					Overall
Team	W		L		T	W		L		T
University Division
No. 20 Rutgers x	4	–	0	–	0	8	–	1	–	0
Lafayette	5	–	1	–	1	5	–	3	–	1
Gettysburg	3	–	1	–	1	7	–	1	–	1
Lehigh	2	–	1	–	2	3	–	3	–	3
Delaware	2	–	3	–	0	5	–	3	–	0
Bucknell	1	–	5	–	0	1	–	8	–	0
Temple	0	–	5	–	0	0	–	8	–	0
Muhlenberg *	1	–	2	–	0	4	–	4	–	0
Northern College Division
Juniata x	6	–	0	–	0	7	–	0	–	1
Lycoming	4	–	1	–	0	7	–	1	–	0
Lebanon Valley	3	–	1	–	1	4	–	3	–	1
Susquehanna	3	–	2	–	0	3	–	4	–	0
Moravian	3	–	3	–	0	4	–	4	–	0
Wagner	3	–	3	–	0	3	–	5	–	0
Dickinson	3	–	4	–	0	4	–	4	–	0
Albright	2	–	4	–	1	2	–	6	–	1
Wilkes	1	–	7	–	0	1	–	8	–	0
Scranton *	2	–	2	–	0	5	–	3	–	0
Southern College Division
Pennsylvania Military x	7	–	1	–	0	7	–	2	–	0
Johns Hopkins	5	–	1	–	0	5	–	3	–	0
Haverford	4	–	2	–	0	4	–	3	–	0
Western Maryland	1	–	4	–	0	3	–	6	–	0
Swarthmore	1	–	4	–	0	1	–	7	–	0
Drexel	1	–	5	–	0	1	–	7	–	0
Ursinus	0	–	8	–	0	0	–	8	–	0
West Chester *	1	–	0	–	0	9	–	1	–	0
Franklin & Marshall *	3	–	1	–	0	5	–	4	–	0
x – Division champion/co-champions; * – Ineligible for championship due to insufficient conference games; Rankings from AP Poll

The 1958 Temple Owls football team was an American football team that represented Temple University as a member of the Middle Atlantic Conference (MAC) during the 1958 college football season. In its third season under head coach Peter P. Stevens, the team compiled a 0–8 record. The season was part of a 21-game losing streak that began on November 2, 1957, and ended on September 24, 1960. The team played its home games at Temple Stadium in Philadelphia.

== Schedule ==
Date	Opponent	Site	Result	Attendance	Source
October 4	Delaware	Temple Stadium; Philadelphia, PA	L 7–14	3,500	
October 11	at Muhlenberg	Muhlenberg Field; Allentown, PA	L 18–21	4,000	
October 18	at Lafayette	Fisher Field; Easton, PA	L 0–35	8,000	
October 25	at Scranton*	Scranton, PA	L 0–6	2,000	
November 1	at Buffalo*	Rotary Field; Buffalo, NY	L 6–54	9,500	
November 8	Bucknell^{†}	Temple Stadium; Philadelphia, PA	L 6–44	4,000	
November 15	Gettysburg	Temple Stadium; Philadelphia, PA	L 6–22	2,500	
November 22	Hofstra*	Temple Stadium; Philadelphia, PA	L 6–34	1,500	
*Non-conference game; ^{†}Homecoming
