= 1958 Brown Bears football team =

American college football season

1958 Brown Bears football
- Conference: Ivy League
- Record: 6–3 (4–3 Ivy)
- Head coach: Alva Kelley (8th season)
- Captain: Don Warburton
- Home stadium: Brown Stadium

1958 Ivy League football standings
	Conf.					Overall
Team	W		L		T	W		L		T
Dartmouth $	6	–	1	–	0	7	–	2	–	0
Cornell	5	–	2	–	0	6	–	3	–	0
Princeton	5	–	2	–	0	6	–	3	–	0
Brown	4	–	3	–	0	6	–	3	–	0
Penn	4	–	3	–	0	4	–	5	–	0
Harvard	3	–	4	–	0	4	–	5	–	0
Columbia	1	–	6	–	0	1	–	8	–	0
Yale	0	–	7	–	0	2	–	7	–	0
$ – Conference champion

The 1958 Brown Bears football team was an American football team that represented Brown University as a member of the Ivy League during the 1958 college football season.

In their eighth and final season under head coach Alva Kelley, the Bears compiled a 6–3 record and outscored opponents 211 to 140. Don Warburton was the team captain.

The Bears' 4–3 conference record tied for fourth place in the Ivy League. They outscored Ivy opponents 136 to 128.

Brown played its home games at Brown Stadium in Providence, Rhode Island.

== Schedule ==
Date	Opponent	Site	Result	Attendance	Source
September 27	at Columbia	Baker Field; New York, NY	W 22–0	8,500	
October 4	Yale	Brown Stadium; Providence, RI	W 35–29	17,600	
October 11	Dartmouth^{†}	Brown Stadium; Providence, RI	L 0–20	17,000	
October 18	at Penn	Franklin Field; Philadelphia, PA	L 20–21	16,921	
October 25	Rhode Island*	Brown Stadium; Providence, RI (rivalry)	W 47–6	13,000	
November 1	at Princeton	Palmer Stadium; Princeton, NJ	L 18–28	28,000	
November 8	Cornell	Brown Stadium; Providence, RI	W 12–8	15,500	
November 15	at Harvard	Harvard Stadium; Boston, MA	W 29–22	15,000	
November 27	Colgate*	Brown Stadium; Providence, RI	W 28–6	8,000	
*Non-conference game; ^{†}Homecoming
