= 1958 UMass Redmen football team =

American college football season

1958 UMass Redmen football
- Conference: Yankee Conference
- Record: 2–6 (1–3 Yankee)
- Head coach: Charlie O'Rourke (7th season)
- Home stadium: Alumni Field

1958 Yankee Conference football standings
	Conf.					Overall
Team	W		L		T	W		L		T
No. 12 Connecticut $	4	–	0	–	0	7	–	3	–	0
Maine	3	–	1	–	0	6	–	2	–	0
Rhode Island	2	–	2	–	0	4	–	4	–	0
UMass	1	–	3	–	0	2	–	6	–	0
Vermont	0	–	1	–	0	2	–	4	–	1
New Hampshire	0	–	4	–	0	2	–	6	–	0
$ – Conference champion; Rankings from UPI small college poll

The 1958 UMass Redmen football team represented the University of Massachusetts Amherst in the 1958 college football season as a member of the Yankee Conference. The team was coached by Charlie O'Rourke and played its home games at Alumni Field in Amherst, Massachusetts. UMass finished the season with a record of 2–6 overall and 1–3 in conference play.

== Schedule ==
Date	Opponent	Site	Result	Attendance	Source
September 20	at Maine	Alumni Field; Orono, ME	L 6–19	4,700	
September 27	Boston University*	Alumni Field; Amherst, MA	L 14–28		
October 4	at Brandeis*	Brandeis Stadium; Waltham, MA	W 36–14		
October 11	Connecticut	Alumni Field; Amherst, MA (rivalry)	L 14–28	6,500	
October 18	at Rhode Island	Meade Stadium; Kingston, RI	L 8–24	3,000	
October 25	Northeastern*	Alumni Field; Amherst, MA	L 0–12		
November 8	at Delaware*	Delaware Stadium; Newark, DE	L 14–28	5,482	
November 15	New Hampshire	Alumni Field; Amherst, MA (rivalry)	W 25–24		
*Non-conference game
