= 1958 Villanova Wildcats football team =

American college football season

1958 Villanova Wildcats football
- Conference: Independent
- Record: 6–4
- Head coach: Frank Reagan (5th season)
- Captains: William Craig; Michael DeLucia; Eugene O'Pella
- Home stadium: Villanova Stadium

1958 Eastern major college football independents records
	Conf.			Overall
Team	W	L	T	W		L		T
No. 3 Army		–		8	–	0	–	1
No. 9 Syracuse		–		8	–	2	–	0
Boston College		–		7	–	3	–	0
Holy Cross		–		6	–	3	–	0
Penn State		–		6	–	3	–	1
Villanova		–		6	–	4	–	0
Pittsburgh		–		5	–	4	–	1
Boston University		–		4	–	5	–	0
Colgate		–		1	–	8	–	0
Rankings from AP poll

The 1958 Villanova Wildcats football team represented the Villanova University during the 1958 college football season. The head coach was Frank Reagan, coaching his fifth season with the Wildcats. The team played their home games at Villanova Stadium in Villanova, Pennsylvania.

== Schedule ==
Date	Opponent	Site	Result	Attendance	Source
September 20	West Chester	Villanova Stadium; Villanova, PA	W 28–14	14,000	
September 27	VMI	Villanova Stadium; Villanova, PA	L 6–33	6,800	
October 4	at Boston College	Alumni Stadium; Chestnut Hill, MA	W 21–19	12,000	
October 11	Detroit	Villanova Stadium; Villanova, PA	W 7–0	7,695–7,965	
October 18	Wake Forest	Villanova Stadium; Villanova, PA	W 9–7	11,439	
October 25	Richmond	Villanova Stadium; Villanova, PA	W 13–6	6,327	
November 1	at Wichita	Veterans Field; Wichita, KS	L 6–21	9,280	
November 8	at Dayton	UD Stadium; Dayton, OH	W 9–6		
November 15	at No. 3 Army	Michie Stadium; West Point, NY	L 0–26	27,250	
November 22	Quantico Marines	Villanova Stadium; Villanova, PA	L 13–19		
Rankings from AP Poll released prior to the game; Source:
