= 1958 Holy Cross Crusaders football team =

American college football season

1958 Holy Cross Crusaders football
- Conference: Independent
- Record: 6–3
- Head coach: Eddie Anderson (15th season)
- Home stadium: Fitton Field

1958 Eastern major college football independents records
	Conf.			Overall
Team	W	L	T	W		L		T
No. 3 Army		–		8	–	0	–	1
No. 9 Syracuse		–		8	–	2	–	0
Boston College		–		7	–	3	–	0
Holy Cross		–		6	–	3	–	0
Penn State		–		6	–	3	–	1
Villanova		–		6	–	4	–	0
Pittsburgh		–		5	–	4	–	1
Boston University		–		4	–	5	–	0
Colgate		–		1	–	8	–	0
Rankings from AP poll

The 1958 Holy Cross Crusaders football team was an American football team that represented the College of the Holy Cross as an independent during the 1958 college football season. In its 15th year under head coach Eddie Anderson, the team compiled a 6–3 record. The team played its home games at Fitton Field in Worcester, Massachusetts.

The team's statistical leaders included Tom Greene with 976 passing yards, Joe Stagnone with 223 rushing yards and 18 points scored, and Dave Stecchi with 331 receiving yards.

== Schedule ==
Date	Opponent	Site	Result	Attendance	Source
September 27	at Pittsburgh	Pitt Stadium; Pittsburgh, PA	L 0–17	49,935	
October 4	Syracuse	Fitton Field; Worcester, MA	W 14–13	20,000	
October 18	at Dartmouth	Memorial Field; Hanover, NH	W 14–8	14,000	
October 25	Boston University^{†}	Fitton Field; Worcester, MA	W 16–8	10,000	
November 1	Dayton	Fitton Field; Worcester, MA	W 26–0	12,000	
November 8	at Colgate	Colgate Athletic Field; Hamilton, NY	W 20–0	6,000	
November 15	at Penn State	New Beaver Field; State College, PA	L 0–32	18,800	
November 22	Marquette	Fitton Field; Worcester, MA	W 14–0	7,000	
December 6	at Boston College	Alumni Stadium; Chestnut Hill, MA (rivalry)	L 8–26	25,000	
^{†}Homecoming
