= 1958 Colgate Red Raiders football team =

American college football season

1958 Colgate Red Raiders football
- Conference: Independent
- Record: 1–8
- Head coach: Fred Rice (2nd season)
- Captain: Robert Conklin
- Home stadium: Colgate Athletic Field

1958 Eastern major college football independents records
	Conf.			Overall
Team	W	L	T	W		L		T
No. 3 Army		–		8	–	0	–	1
No. 9 Syracuse		–		8	–	2	–	0
Boston College		–		7	–	3	–	0
Holy Cross		–		6	–	3	–	0
Penn State		–		6	–	3	–	1
Villanova		–		6	–	4	–	0
Pittsburgh		–		5	–	4	–	1
Boston University		–		4	–	5	–	0
Colgate		–		1	–	8	–	0
Rankings from AP poll

The 1958 Colgate Red Raiders football team was an American football team that represented Colgate University as an independent during the 1958 college football season. In its second season under head coach Fred Rice, the team compiled a 1–8 record. Robert Conklin was the team captain.

The team played its home games at Colgate Athletic Field in Hamilton, New York.

== Schedule ==
Date	Opponent	Site	Result	Attendance	Source
September 27	at Cornell	Schoellkopf Field; Ithaca, NY (rivalry)	L 0–13	12,000	
October 4	Rutgers	Colgate Athletic Field; Hamilton, NY	L 7–21	6,500	
October 11	at Bucknell	Memorial Stadium; Lewisburg, PA	W 7–0	7,856–7,865	
October 18	at Princeton	Palmer Stadium; Princeton, NJ	L 13–40	23,500	
October 25	at Yale	Yale Bowl; New Haven, CT	L 7–14	20,328	
November 1	at No. 3 Army	Michie Stadium; West Point, NY	L 6–68	24,750	
November 8	Holy Cross	Colgate Athletic Field; Hamilton, NY	L 0–20	6,000	
November 15	at No. 12 Syracuse	Archbold Stadium; Syracuse, NY (rivalry)	L 0–47	30,000	
November 27	at Brown	Brown Stadium; Providence, RI	L 0–20	8,000	
Rankings from AP Poll released prior to the game

== Leading players ==
Statistical leaders for the 1958 Red Raiders included:

- Rushing: Bernard Dailey, 292 yards and 2 touchdowns on 77 attempts
- Passing: Raymond Harding, 337 yards, 36 completions and 2 touchdowns on 94 attempts
- Receiving: Alfred Jamison, 173 yards and 1 touchdown on 17 receptions
- Total offense: Raymond Harding, 426 yards (337 passing, 89 rushing)
- Scoring: Bernard Dailey, 12 points from 2 touchdowns
- All-purpose yards: R. Douglas Ammon, 406 yards (150 rushing, 136 kickoff returning, 77 punt returning, 24 interception returning, 19 receiving)
