= 1958 Pittsburgh Panthers football team =

American college football season

1958 Pittsburgh Panthers football
- Conference: Independent
- Record: 5–4–1
- Head coach: John Michelosen (4th season)
- Home stadium: Pitt Stadium

1958 Eastern major college football independents records
	Conf.			Overall
Team	W	L	T	W		L		T
No. 3 Army		–		8	–	0	–	1
No. 9 Syracuse		–		8	–	2	–	0
Boston College		–		7	–	3	–	0
Holy Cross		–		6	–	3	–	0
Penn State		–		6	–	3	–	1
Villanova		–		6	–	4	–	0
Pittsburgh		–		5	–	4	–	1
Boston University		–		4	–	5	–	0
Colgate		–		1	–	8	–	0
Rankings from AP poll

The 1958 Pittsburgh Panthers football team represented the University of Pittsburgh as an independent during the 1958 college football season. The team compiled a 5–4–1 record under head coach John Michelosen. The team played their home games at Pitt Stadium in Pittsburgh.

== Schedule ==
Date	Opponent	Rank	Site	TV	Result	Attendance	Source
September 20	at UCLA	No. 19	Los Angeles Memorial Coliseum; Los Angeles, CA		W 27–6	30,578	
September 27	Holy Cross	No. 7	Pitt Stadium; Pittsburgh, PA		W 17–0	49,935	
October 4	at Minnesota	No. 12	Memorial Stadium; Minneapolis, MN		W 13–7	56,450	
October 11	at No. 9 Michigan State	No. 10	Spartan Stadium; East Lansing, MI		L 8–22	56,793	
October 18	West Virginia		Pitt Stadium; Pittsburgh, PA (rivalry)		W 15–8	42,269	
October 25	No. 1 Army		Pitt Stadium; Pittsburgh, PA	NBC	T 14–14	50,287	
November 1	at Syracuse	No. 12	Archbold Stadium; Syracuse, NY (rivalry)		L 13–16	38,000	
November 8	No. 14 Notre Dame		Pitt Stadium; Pittsburgh, PA (rivalry)		W 29–26	55,330	
November 15	at Nebraska	No. 14	Memorial Stadium; Lincoln, NE		L 6–14	24,107	
November 27	Penn State	No. 19	Pitt Stadium; Pittsburgh, PA (rivalry)		L 21–25	39,479	
Rankings from AP Poll released prior to the game

== Preseason ==
On April 9, sixty-two aspirants reported for spring drills at Ellsworth Field. Coach Michelosen had 19 lettermen returning, plus 28 scholarship players from the 1957 freshmen team. The NCAA allowed the Panthers 20 practice days. The drills ended with a football clinic for high school coaches in the morning followed by the annual Spring Game at Wildwood on May 10. Co-captains, center Don Crafton and guard Ed Michaels, chose the teams. Michaels' Blues squad beat Crafton's Whites 29–0. Michelosen told The Pitt News: “We should have a lot more depth at every position in 1958 as compared to last year's eleven. The main problem at the present will be to study the movies of the game and try to see what the boys did wrong and then correct it.”

Fall practice commenced on September 1 to prepare for their September 20 opening game at UCLA. Sixty-five Panthers lived and ate in Salk Hall (formerly Municipal Hospital), dressed in the Stadium and practiced twice daily on a new practice field across the street from Memorial Field House. Coach Michelosen added two ex-Panthers to his coaching staff. Lou Cecconi replaced Steve Petro as freshmen coach and Carl DePasqua mentored the backfield.

== Game summaries ==
=== at UCLA ===
Week 1: Pitt at UCLA

Team	1	2	3	4	Total
• Pitt	6	6	3	12	27
UCLA	0	6	0	0	6

- Date: September 20, 1958
- Location: Los Angeles Memorial Coliseum
  Los Angeles, CA
- Game start: 2:00 p.m.
- Game attendance: 30,578
- Game weather: hot with smog
- Referee: M. Edward Wagner

Scoring summary
1	PITT	Ivan Toncic 1-yard run (kick missed)	PITT 6–0
2	PITT	Toncic 55-yard pass interception (pass failed)	PITT 12–0
2	UCLA	Bill Kilmer 2-yard run ( kick blocked)	PITT 12–6
3	PITT	Norton Seaman 14-yard field goal	PITT 15–6
4	PITT	Dick Haley 2-yard run (kick missed)	PITT 21–6
4	PITT	Mike Ditka 16-yard pass from Ed Sharockman (kick blocked)	PITT 27–6

On September 18, the Panthers contingent boarded a TWA constellation at 8 a.m. that was to arrive in Los Angeles, CA at about 3:30 p.m. They had a late afternoon workout scheduled at the Los Angeles Coliseum. Then they were housed at the Ambassador Hotel. This was the Panthers first game against the Bruins. Unfortunately, the plane lost an engine going over the Kansas-Colorado border and had to land in Albuquerque, N.M. While a plane was dispatched from Los Angeles, Coach Michelosen arranged a practice at the University of New Mexico football facility. The Panthers finally arrived at the Ambassador at 11:30 p.m. (18 hour trip).

Meanwhile, the UCLA Bruins were in a transition period. Nine-year coach Red Sanders died unexpectedly of a heart attack on August 14. Assistant coach George W. Dickerson replaced Sanders, and inherited a squad with 7 starters being punished by the Pacific Coast Conference for recruiting violations. The seven were allowed to play only 5 games on the schedule, and they had to be consecutive.

The underdog Panthers spoiled the Bruins home opener with a 27–6 upset. The Panthers scored in every period. In the first, the Panthers received the opening kick-off and Ivan Toncic directed a 10-play drive ending with his 2-yard sneak for the opening touchdown. Toncic's placement missed wide left. Toncic scored in the second quarter on a 55-yard pass interception. Michelosen had Pitt try for 2 points, but the pass fell incomplete. UCLA scored with seconds left in the first half. After a 58-yard jump pass from Bill Kilmer to Marv Luster put the ball on the Panthers 2-yard line, Kilmer ran around left end for the touchdown. Mike Ditka blocked the extra point. Panthers guard Norton Seaman booted a 14-yard field goal in the third period. The Panthers added two more touchdowns in the final period. Dick Haley scored on a 2-yard run and Mike Ditka caught a 16-yard pass from Ed Sharockman. One placement was wide and one was blocked.

The Panthers gained 324 total yards and earned 20 first downs. Joe Scisly led the Pitt rushers with 58 yards on 9 carries for a 6.4 yard average gain. Ivan Toncic completed 4 of 5 passes for 80 yards. Sophomore Ed Sharockman completed 1 of 2 for a touchdown. Mike Ditka had 2 receptions for 35 yards and a touchdown. The Panthers defense held UCLA to 10 first downs on 178 total yards.

Coach Michelosen told the L. A. Times: “We got the jump on UCLA, and under weather conditions like this, that probably made the difference. My quarterbacks called a fine game, and I was especially pleased the way we showed up in the line. The boys were blocking crisply and of course that's what gave my veteran ball carriers their running room.”

The Pitt starting lineup for the game against UCLA was Jim Zanos (left end), Ken Montanari (left tackle), John Guzik (left guard), Don Crafton (center), Ed Michaels (right guard), Bill Lindner (right tackle), Art Gob (right end), Ivan Toncic (quarterback), Dick Haley (left halfback), Joe Scisly (right halfback) and Fred Riddle (fullback). Substitutes appearing in the game for Pitt were Joe Pullekines, Mike Ditka, Dick Mills, Leonard Vella, Ed Fornadel, Bob Longfellow, Al Corfield, Serafino Fazio, Mike Lucci, Henry Suffoletta, Norton Seaman, Ernie Westwood, Charles Marranca, Bob Rathi, Ron Delfine, David Walker, Bill Kaliden, Ed Sharockman, Peter Prince, Andy Sepsi, John Flara, Curt Plowman, Chuck Reinhold, Bob Stark, Jim Cunningham and Marty Baracca.

=== Holy Cross ===
Week 2: Holy Cross at Pitt

Team	1	2	3	4	Total
Holy Cross	0	0	0	0	0
• Pitt	7	0	3	7	17

- Date: September 27, 1958
- Location: Pitt Stadium
  Pittsburgh, PA
- Game start: 1:30 p.m.
- Game attendance: 49,935
- Game weather: rain early, then clear
- Referee: William Reynolds (Dayton)

Scoring summary
1	PITT	Art Gob 5-yard pass from Ivan Toncic (Toncic kick)	PITT 7–0
3	PITT	Norton Seaman 17-yard field goal	PITT 10–0
4	PITT	Chuck Reinhold 20-yard run ( Seaman kick)	PITT 17–0

On September 28, the Panthers home opener against Holy Cross was designated High School Day, Band Day and Boy Scout Day. This was the only time that Pitt and Holy Cross would play football. Holy Cross Coach Eddie Anderson was in his fifteenth year and told The Pittsburgh Press that this team was “the best I've ever had.” The Crusaders were led at quarterback by All-America candidate Tom Greene.

The Panthers were ranked #7 in the Associated Press Poll and favored by seven and a half points. Coach Michelosen kept the starting line-up intact. He told The Press: “We had an exceptional performance for an opening game, but the boys should get better timing and execution this week.”

In front of 49,935 opening day fans, the Panthers dominated the Holy Cross eleven with a 17–0 shutout. Pitt earned 18 first downs and gained 284 total yards. Their defense held the Crusaders to 7 first downs and 109 total yards (all through the air). Tom Greene was 4 of 15 for 100 yards with 2 interceptions. Pitt scored in the first quarter after guard John Guzik recovered a Holy Cross fumble on the Crusader 20-yard line. On the fifth play Ivan Toncic completed a 5-yard pass to Art Gob for the touchdown. Toncic converted the extra point and Pitt led 7–0. In the third quarter Pitt end Art Gob recovered a Crusader fumble on the visitor's 28-yard line. 10 plays moved the ball to the 2-yard line. An end around lost 9 yards, and Coach Michelosen opted to try a field goal. Norton Seaman's kick was good and Pitt led 10–0. Sophomore quarterback Ed Sharockman directed a 6-play, 68-yard scoring drive in the final quarter. Sophomore halfback Chuck Reinhold ran the last 20 yards for the score, and Seaman's placement was good.

The Pitt starting lineup for the game against Holy Cross was Jim Zanos (left end), Ken Montanari (left tackle), John Guzik (left guard), Don Crafton (center), Ed Michaels (right guard), Bill Lindner (right tackle), Art Gob (right end), Ivan Toncic (quarterback), Dick Haley (left halfback), Joe Scisly (right halfback) and Fred Riddle (fullback). Substitutes appearing in the game for Pitt were Joe Pullekines, Mike Ditka, Dick Mills, Leonard Vella, Norton Seaman, Ed Fornadel, Bob Longfellow, Al Corfield, Serafino Fazio, Mike Lucci, Henry Suffoletta, Ernie Westwood, Charles Marranca, Ron Delfine, David Walker, Bill Kaliden, Ed Sharockman, Peter Prince, Andy Sepsi, John Flara, Curt Plowman, Chuck Reinhold, Bob Stark and Jim Cunningham.

=== at Minnesota ===
Week 3: Pitt at Minnesota

Team	1	2	3	4	Total
• Pitt	0	0	0	13	13
Minnesota	0	0	7	0	7

- Date: October 4, 1958
- Location: Memorial Stadium
  Minneapolis, MN
- Game start: 1:30 p.m.
- Game attendance: 56,540
- Game weather: cloudy and warm
- Referee: Coles

Scoring summary
3	MINN	Roger Hagberg 6-yard run (Everett Gerths kick)	MINN 7–0
4	PITT	Bill Kaliden 1-yard sneak	{{{Score}}}
4	PITT	Bill Kaliden 1-yard sneak ( Seaman kick)	PITT 13–7

Pitt's second road trip of the season was to Minneapolis, MN to play fifth-year coach Coach Murray Warmath's Minnesota Gophers. Minnesota led the all-time series 9–0 and had out scored the Panthers 252–51. The Gophers were 0–1, having lost to Washington 21–24. On Friday morning, the Panthers contingent flew into Minneapolis, and held a workout in Memorial Stadium that afternoon. They housed at the Curtis Hotel. The Panthers were missing three starters due to injuries. End Art Gob (shoulder), halfback Dick Haley (ankle) and quarterback Ivan Toncic (torn rib cartilage) did not start. Reserve quarterback Bill Kaliden (bruised foot) made the trip. Reserve end Bob Rathi (neck), guard Al Corfield (neck), Pat Morsillo (leg) and Elmer Merkovsky (leg) did not make the trip.

The #12 ranked Panthers extended their win streak to three games with a narrow 13–7 victory over the Gophers. The Gophers threatened to score four times in the first half. The Gophers opening drive went to the Panthers 20-yard line, where Ed Sharockman intercepted Jim Reese's pass on the 11-yard line and returned it to the 35-yard line. In the second quarter, Minnesota drove to the Panthers 35-yard line, but turned the ball over when John Guzik tackled Arlie Bomstad for no gain on fourth down. Pitt fumbled the ball right back on the Panthers 33-yard line. Minnesota took 8 plays to get to a fourth and 2 on the 3-yard line. Pitt end Joe Pullekines tackled Reese for a 14-yard loss to end that threat. Late in the first half Reese directed the Gophers to the Panthers 18-yard line. The Pitt defense stiffened again and sacked Reese on first and second down. Third and fourth down pass plays fell incomplete. The Panthers offense sputtered at the start of the second half when fullback Fred Riddle fumbled the kick-off and Minnesota recovered on the 32-yard line. This time Reese directed a 6-play scoring drive. Rogers Hagberg took a pitchout from Reese and ran 6 yards around left end for the touchdown. Everett Gerths kicked the extra point and Minnesota led 7–0. The Panthers offense answered with a 70-yard drive, led by Bill Kaliden, but they lost the ball on downs on the 13-yard line. After an exchange of punts, the Panthers drove 96 yards and lost the ball on downs at the 1 foot line. The Gophers punted and Pitt had possession on the Minnesota 33-yard line. On the fourth play Kaliden scored on a 1-yard sneak. Sharockman tried for the 2-point conversion and lost yards on a roll-out. The Panthers defense forced a punt and Pitt had possession on the Gophers 43-yard line with less than 5 minutes to play. Sharockman directed 5 running plays to the 20-yard line and was replaced by Kaliden. Kaliden threw a 6-yard pass to Joe Scisly, and a second pass to Jim Zanos for 13 yards. Kaliden scored on a 1-yard sneak. Norton Seaman kicked the extra point and Pitt led 13–7. After the kick-off, Reese threw an interception on first down and Pitt ran out the clock.

Statistically, the Panthers earned 17 first downs and gained a total of 298 yards. They held Minnesota to 13 first downs and 170 total yards. Fullback Bob Stark led the Pitt rushers with 59 yards on 10 carries. Bill Kaliden scored 2 touchdowns, rushed for 49 yards on 9 carries and completed 5 of 10 passes for 52 yards.

The Pitt starting lineup for the game against Minnesota was Jim Zanos (left end), Ken Montanari (left tackle), John Guzik (left guard), Don Crafton (center), Ed Michaels (right guard), Bill Lindner (right tackle), Joe Pullekines (right end), Ed Sharockman (quarterback), Chuck Reinhold (left halfback), Joe Scisly (right halfback) and Fred Riddle (fullback). Substitutes appearing in the game for Pitt were Art Gob, Mike Ditka, Dick Mills, Norton Seaman, Serafino Fazio, Henry Suffoletta, Ernie Westwood, Ron Delfine, Bill Kaliden, Andy Sepsi, John Flara, Curt Plowman and Bob Stark.

=== at Michigan State ===
Week 4: Pitt at Michigan State

Team	1	2	3	4	Total
Pitt	0	0	0	8	8
• Michigan State	8	8	0	6	22

- Date: October 11, 1958
- Location: Spartan Stadium
  East Lansing, MI
- Game start: 1:30 p.m.
- Game attendance: 56,793
- Game weather: cold and windy
- Referee: Rollie Barnum (Big Ten)

Scoring summary
1	MSU	Mike Panitch 1-yard run (Art Johnson shovel pass from Panitch)	MSU 8–0
2	MSU	Dean Look 2-yard run (Johnson run)	MSU 16–0
4	PITT	Dick Haley 9-yard run (Ron Delfine pass from Ivan Toncic)	MSU 16–8
4	MSU	Dick Barker 5-yard pass from Larry Bielat (pass failed)	MSU 22–8

On October 11, the #10-ranked Panthers were in East Lansing, MI to play the # 9-ranked Michigan State Spartans. This was Pitt's third road game in 4 weeks. The Panthers were 0–3 against the Spartans, and had been outscored 84–33. The Spartans led by College Football Hall of Fame coach Duffy Daugherty were 1–0–1 for the season. End Sam Williams was a consensus All-America and the roster contained future stars Fred Arbanas, George Perles, Herb Adderly and Wayne Fontes. Coach Daugherty's Spartans had beaten 13 of 14 non-conference opponents. They were favored by 2 touchdowns.

The Panthers left Pittsburgh Friday morning and flew into Lansing, MI. Coach Michelosen held an afternoon workout on Spartan Stadium. The Panthers stayed at the Olds Hotel. Starting end Art Gob (shoulder) did not play. Injured Panthers who were available were halfback Dick Haley (ankle), halfback Chuck Reinhold (ankle), quarterback Ivan Toncic (ribs) and quarterback Bill Kaliden (foot).

Michigan State improved Daugherty's non-conference record to 14 of 15 by beating the Panthers for the fourth straight time 22–8. Late in the first quarter, State halfback Dean Look punted the ball dead on the Pitt 1-yard line. The Pitt offense chose to punt on third down. Art Johnson returned the ball to the Panthers 23-yard line. The Spartans scored in 6 plays. Quarterback Mike Panitch went over center from the 1-yard line for the score. Panitch lateraled to Johnson for the two-point conversion and Pitt trailed 8–0. After the ensuing kick-off, the Panthers were forced to punt. State returned this one to the Panthers 34-yard line. On the first play of the second period State scored on a 2-yard run by Look. Johnson ran around end for another 2-point conversion and Pitt trailed 16–0 at halftime. The second time the Panthers had possession in the third quarter they managed to drive 42 yards in 8 plays. Dick Haley ran the last 9 yards over right tackle for the touchdown. A pass from Ivan Toncic to Ron Delfine earned two more points for the Panthers to cut the lead to 16–8. The Michigan State defense shut down the Panthers offense the rest of the game. The Spartans third-string added a late touchdown on a 6-yard pass from Larry Bielat to Dick Barker. The two-point conversion try failed.

The Pitt starting lineup for the game against Michigan State was Jim Zanos (left end), Ken Montanari (left tackle), Norton Seaman (left guard), Don Crafton (center), Ed Michaels (right guard), Bill Lindner (right tackle), Joe Pullekines (right end), Ivan Toncic (quarterback), Andy Sepsi (left halfback), Joe Scisly (right halfback) and Fred Riddle (fullback). Substitutes appearing in the game for Pitt were Bob Rathi, Mike Ditka, Dick Mills, John Guzik, Serafino Fazio, Henry Suffoletta, Ernie Westwood, Ron Delfine, Bill Kaliden, Ed Sharockman, Dick Haley, John Flara, Curt Plowman, Bob Stark, Jim Cunningham and Marty Baracca.

=== West Virginia ===
Week 5: West Virginia at Pitt

Team	1	2	3	4	Total
West Virginia	8	0	0	0	8
• Pitt	0	8	7	0	15

- Date: October 18, 1958
- Location: Pitt Stadium
  Pittsburgh, PA
- Game start: 1:30 p.m.
- Game attendance: 42,269
- Game weather: sunny and mild
- Referee: David H. Buchanan (Temple)

Scoring summary
1	WVA	Danny Williams 2-yard run (pass from Williams to Dave Rider for 2 pts.)	WVA 8–0
2	PITT	John Flara 71-yard pass from Ivan Toncic (Mike Ditka pass from Bill Kaliden for 2 pts.)	TIED 8–8
3	PITT	Dick Haley 8-yard pass from Toncic ( Marty Baracca kick)	PITT 15–8

On October 18, the Panthers Homecoming opponent was the West Virginia Mountaineers. This was the fifty-first meeting of the Backyard Brawl, and Pitt led the series 37–12–1. Coach Art Lewis' Mountaineers were 1–3 on the season. The Mountaineers were minus five starters due to injuries.

Coach Michelosen had end Art Gob and halfback Dick Haley back in the starting lineup. After four games the Panthers led the East in total defense and rushing defense. Fullback Fred Riddle led the East in punting with a 42.1 average.

Pitt rallied to beat the Mountaineers 15–8 for their thirty-eighth victory in the series. In the first period Pitt had possession on their own 11-yard line. On first down John Flara fumbled a hand-off. Mountaineer center Charles Lanasa caught it in midair, and carried it to the 3-yard line. On second down, quarterback Danny Williams ran inside left end to score. Williams completed a pass to Dave Rider for the two-point conversion. Late in the second quarter, the Pitt offense answered. With possession on his own 29-yard line, Ivan Toncic threw a 71-yard touchdown pass to Flara. Bill Kaliden passed to Mike Ditka for the two point conversion to tie the score. West Virginia did not have a first down in the first half, but the score was 8–8. Late in the third quarter, Pitt gained possession on their 36-yard line. On first down, Toncic threw to Art Gob for 13 yards. Then, Toncic threw to Dick Haley for 35 yards, and a first down on the WVU 15-yard line. Then, Toncic threw to Gob, but John Bowles intercepted on the 8-yard line. Gob knocked the ball loose when he tackled Bowles, and recovered for Pitt on the 10-yard line. On second down, Toncic threw a swing pass to Haley, and he ran the final 8 yards for the Panthers second touchdown. Marty Barraca booted the extra point, and Pitt led 15–8. The Panthers regained possession and drove to the WVU 14-yard line. Fred Riddle ran around end for the score, but Pitt was offside and lost the ball on downs. With less than a minute to play, Ditka punted out of bounds on the WVU 1-yard line. Michelosen had his third-string defense on the field. On first down, Williams threw 34-yards to Ray Petersen. The next pass went 19-yards to Terry Fairbanks. Williams was injured and had to leave the game. He was replaced by Chuck Simpson. On first down, Pitt defensive halfback Curt Plowman was called for pass interference, and the ball placed on the Pitt 26-yard line. Toncic replaced Plowman. Simpson connected with Bruce McClung for 20 yards to the Pitt 6-yard line (Toncic made the tackle). On the final play of the game, Toncic intercepted Simpson's pass in the end zone to seal the victory.

Statistically it should have been a rout. Pitt had 16 first downs, 258 yards passing and 65 yards rushing. They held WVU to 7 first downs, 90 yards passing and 41 yards rushing. But, Pitt fumbled 6 times and lost 4, had 3 passes intercepted and was penalized 7 times for 70 yards.

Coach Michelosen told the Sun-Telegraph: “Those fellows always are tough for us. They get up for this game and they really gave us a battle today. We hurt ourselves a lot in the first half with our fumbling. With Army coming up next, this was a good one to win.”

The Pitt starting lineup for the game against West Virginia was Jim Zanos (left end), Ken Montanari (left tackle), John Guzik (left guard), Don Crafton (center), Ed Michaels (right guard), Bill Lindner (right tackle), Art Gob (right end), Ivan Toncic (quarterback), Dick Haley (left halfback), Joe Scisly (right halfback) and Fred Riddle (fullback). Substitutes appearing in the game for Pitt were Joe Pullekines, Bob Rathi, Mike Ditka, Dick Mills, Leonard Vella, Bob Longfellow, Serafino Fazio, Mike Lucci, Henry Suffoletta, Ernie Westwood, Ron Delfine, Bill Kaliden, Ed Sharockman, Chuck Reinhold, John Flara, Curt Plowman, Jim Cunningham and Marty Baracca.

=== Army ===
Week 6: Army at Pitt

Team	1	2	3	4	Total
Army	0	14	0	0	14
Pitt	0	6	8	0	14

- Date: October 18, 1958
- Location: Pitt Stadium
  Pittsburgh, PA
- Game start: 1:30 p.m.
- Game attendance: 50,287
- Game weather: rain
- Referee: Paul Bertha (Duquesne)

Scoring summary
1	ARMY	Steve Waldrop 4-yard run (Harry Walters kick)	ARMY 7–0
2	ARMY	Don Usry 7-yard pass from Bob Anderson (Walters kick)	ARMY 14–0
2	PITT	John Flara 43-yard pass from Bill Kaliden (incomplete pass)	ARMY 14–6
4	PITT	Jim Zanos 6-yard pass from Ivan Toncic (Dick Haley shovel pass from Toncic for 2 pts.)	TIED 14–14

On October 18 the Panthers welcomed the #1-ranked Army Cadets from West Point. Red Blaik's Cadets were 4–0, and had only surrendered 16 points. Pitt led the series 5–2, but in 1944, when Pitt played the #2 Army team that finished the season #1, Pitt lost 69–7. That team had an All-American backfield of fullback Doc Blanchard and halfback Glenn Davis. This season Blaik had the same advantage with halfbacks Bob Anderson and Pete Dawkins. On Monday, six Pitt students traveled to West Point and attempted to kidnap the Army Mule (Poncho). They entered the facility, had possession of the mule and led him off of the campus. Unfortunately, while loading the mule into a trailer, they were apprehended by the authorities and spent the night in the military police barracks. They were released the next morning, and were able to say goodbye to the mule, before heading back to Pittsburgh.

50,287 fans sat through intermittent rain to see the Pitt Panthers rally to overcome a fourteen point deficit, and tie the Army Cadets 14–14. Army scored both their touchdowns in the second quarter. The Cadets went 52-yards in 10 plays with Steve Waldrop going 4 yards around end for the score. Later, Waldrop intercepted a Dick Haley pass on the Panthers 43-yard line and returned it to the 33-yard line. Army needed 7 plays to score, with halfback Bob Anderson's 7-yard pass to Don Usry completing the drive. Harry Walters kicked both extra points and Army led 14–0. Finally, the Panthers gained possession on their 13- yard line and the offense clicked. The Panthers scored in 4 plays. The highlights were Bill Kaliden's 33-yard pass to Mike Ditka, followed by his 43-yard toss to John Flara for the touchdown. Kaliden's two-point conversion pass fell incomplete. After the Army kicked out of bounds twice to start the third quarter, the Panthers had possession on their 42-yard line. They needed 8 plays to score. End Jim Zanos caught a 6-yard pass from Ivan Toncic and Toncic's shovel pass to Dick Haley tied the score. Pitt threatened to score three more times in the quarter, but the Army defense and penalties stopped the drives. Army drove to the Pitt 4-yard line in the final quarter, but the Panthers defense held and took over on downs.

The Pitt starting lineup for the game against Army was Jim Zanos (left end), Ken Montanari (left tackle), John Guzik (left guard), Don Crafton (center), Ed Michaels (right guard), Bill Lindner (right tackle), Art Gob (right end), Ivan Toncic (quarterback), Dick Haley (left halfback), Joe Scisly (right halfback) and Fred Riddle (fullback). Substitutes appearing in the game for Pitt were Joe Pullekines, Bob Rathi, Mike Ditka, Dick Mills, Bob Longfellow, Norton Seaman, Serafino Fazio, Henry Suffoletta, Ernie Westwood, David Walker, Ron Delfine, Bill Kaliden, Ed Sharockman, John Flara, Curt Plowman and Jim Cunningham.

=== at Syracuse ===
Week 7: Pitt at Syracuse

Team	1	2	3	4	Total
Pitt	0	0	6	7	13
• Syracuse	0	10	0	6	16

- Date: November 1, 1958
- Location: Archbold Stadium
  Syracuse, NY
- Game start: 1:30 p.m.
- Game attendance: 38,000
- Game weather: sunny and cool

Scoring summary
2	SYR	Bob Yates 18-yard field goal	SYR 3–0
2	SYR	Chuck Zimmerman 5-yard run (Yates kick)	SYR 10–0
3	PITT	Jim Cunningham 25-yard pass from Bill Kaliden (run failed)	SYR 10–6
4	PITT	Fred Riddle 1-yard run (Norton Seaman kick)	PITT 13–10
4	SYR	Zimmerman 1-yard run (kick wide right)	SYR 16–13

On November 1, the Panthers fourth road game of the season was against Ben Schwartzwalder's Syracuse eleven. Pitt led the series 8–3–2. The Orangemen were 4–1. Their only blemish was a 14–13 loss to Holy Cross. On Thursday, four starters and three reserves had upset stomach issues. Reserves Ron Bartlett (end) and John Prahl (halfback) were not able to play. Tom Stephens (halfback), Dave Baker (end), Al Benecick (guard), Dave Applehof (center) and Tom Gilburg (end) recovered and played.

Pitt guard John Guzik was voted “Lineman of the Week” by the Associated Press. After six games, the Panthers ranked #3 in total defense with an average yield of 156 yards per game. Michelosen made one change from the line-up that started the Army game. He played Joe Pullekines at left end instead of Jim Zanos.

For the second year in a row, the Orangemen beat the Panthers by a field goal 16–13. After stopping a Pitt drive on the 1-yard line in the opening period, Syracuse scored twice in the second quarter and led at halftime 10–0. Syracuse end Gary Skonieczki recovered a Dick Haley fumble on the Panthers 32-yard line. The Pitt defense stiffened on the 11-yard line, but Bob Yates' 28-yard field goal was good and Syracuse led 3–0. Syracuse forced a punt and regained possession on their 22-yard line. Syracuse needed 10 plays to score. Quarterback Chuck Zimmerman ran the final five yards and Yates' extra point made it 10–0 at halftime. The Panthers took the second half kick-off and advanced to the Syracuse 4-yard line, but lost the ball on downs. Syracuse quick-kicked a 60-yarder. The Panthers' offense then scored in 9 plays on a 25-yard pass from Bill Kaliden to Jim Cunningham. The Panthers lined up for the extra point, but they faked and Kaliden was sacked. In the final quarter, Pitt recovered a Syracuse fumble on the Orangemen's 45-yard line. The Pitt offense scored on a 1-yard Fred Riddle plunge. Norton Seaman kicked the extra point and Pitt led 13–10 with less than nine minutes to go. Syracuse answered with an 80-yard drive. Chuck Zimmerman ran the final yard for the score, which put Syracuse back in the lead 13–10. Yates' placement was wide right. The stadium clock read 1:38. After receiving the kick-off, Pitt's Kaliden completed a pass to Haley, and then another to Ron Delfine, and the Panthers were on the Syracuse 21-yard line with 8 seconds left. Kaliden's pass was intercepted in the end zone by Dan Fogarty and 38,000 Syracuse fans went home happy.

Thee Panthers gained 23 first downs and had 365 total yards (264 through the air). Their defense held Syracuse to 13 first downs and 220 total yards. Bill Kaliden completed 9 of 15 passes for 153 yards with 1 touchdown and 1 interception. Ivan Toncic was 8 of 13 for 88 yards.

The Pitt starting lineup for the game against Syracuse was Joe Pullekines (left end), Ken Montanari (left tackle), Norton Seaman (left guard), Don Crafton (center), Ed Michaels (right guard), Bill Lindner (right tackle), Art Gob (right end), Ivan Toncic (quarterback), Dick Haley (left halfback), Joe Scisly (right halfback) and Fred Riddle (fullback). Substitutes appearing in the game for Pitt were Jim Zanos, Mike Ditka, Dick Mills, Leonard Vella, Bob Longfellow, John Guzik, Serafino Fazio, Henry Suffoletta, Ernie Westwood, Ron Delfine, Bill Kaliden, John Flara, Chuck Reinhold, Curt Plowman and Jim Cunningham.

=== Notre Dame ===
Week 8: Notre Dame at Pitt

Team	1	2	3	4	Total
Notre Dame	0	14	6	6	26
• Pitt	0	15	7	7	29

- Date: November 8, 1958
- Location: Pitt Stadium
  Pittsburgh, PA
- Game start: 1:30 p.m.
- Game attendance: 55,330
- Referee: Ross Dean (Big Ten)

Scoring summary
2	PITT	Dick Haley 1-yard run (Art Gob pass from Ivan Toncic)	PITT 8–0
2	PITT	Haley 2-yard run (Norton Seaman kick)	PITT 15–0
2	ND	Monte Stickles 11-yard pass from George Izo ( pass failed)	PITT 15–6
2	ND	Stickles 8-yard pass from Izo (Nick Pietrosante pass from Izo)	PITT 15–14
3	ND	Izo 1-yard run (pass failed)	ND 20–15
3	PITT	Toncic 10-yard run (Seaman kick)	PITT 22–20
4	ND	Izo 1-yard run (pass failed)	ND 26–22
4	PITT	Bill Kaliden 5-yard run (Seaman kick)	PITT 29–26

The eighth game of the season was against the Notre Dame Fighting Irish. Notre Dame led the all-time series 16–7–1. Coach Terry Brennan's squad was ranked #14 and had a 4–2 record. The Irish were led by quarterback George Izo, plus All-Americans - fullback Nick Pietrosante and end Monty Stickles.

Coach Michelosen started sophomores Mike Ditka at left end and Jim Cunningham at fullback. The Pitt passing offense ranked #7 in the nation, averaging 151 yards per game, and Notre Dame ranked #8 in total offense, with 346.3 yards per game.

After a scoreless first quarter, the Panthers and Irish put on an offensive show to keep the 55,330 fans on edge until the Panthers scored in the final 11 seconds to earn a 29–26 victory. In the first quarter, the Irish offense twice penetrated deep into Pitt territory. The first drive ended with Monty Stickles missing wide-left on a 28-yard field goal. The second drive ended with a Pitt fumble recovery. In the second quarter, Pitt gained possession on the Irish 1-yard line, when quarterback George Izo fumbled the snap and John Guzik recovered. Dick Haley ran for the touchdown. Norton Seaman missed the extra point, but Notre Dame was holding. Pitt opted to try for two points, and Ivan Toncic passed to Art Gob to make it 8–0. Pitt regained possession on the Notre Dame 32-yard line via a Don Crafton interception. On first down Toncic passed to Curt Plowman for a 27-yard gain. On second down Haley scored from 2-yards out and Seaman kicked the extra point for a 15–0 lead. Notre Dame answered with a 4-play, 80-yard drive. Izo passed 11-yards to Stickles for the touchdown, but the two point try failed. Then Irish center Myron Pottios intercepted a Toncic pass on the Panthers 36-yard line. This 10-play drive ended with an 8-yard pass from Izo to Stickles. Izo passed to Nick Pietrosante for the two-pointer and the halftime score was 15–14. Pitt received the third period kick-off. Curt Plowman fumbled on first down and Notre Dame guard Al Ecuyer recovered on the Panthers 24-yard line. Izo scored on a quarterback sneak to put the Irish ahead 20–15. The two-point attempt failed. Pitt answered with an 11-play, 65-yard drive. Toncic ran the last 10 yards for the touchdown and Seaman booted the extra point for a 22–20 Pitt lead. Notre Dame drove to the Panthers 7-yard line and Izo fumbled the ball back to Pitt. In the final quarter, Notre Dame gained possession on their own 28-yard line. On first down halfback Red Mack lost 3 yards. On second down he caught an Izo pass for a 72-yard gain. Izo scored on third down from the 1-yard line. The two point try failed, but Notre Dame led 26–22. Pitt gained possession on their own 27-yard line with less than 7 minutes remaining. Second-string quarterback Bill Kaliden led the 14-play drive. On fourth down, he carried the ball into the end zone from the 5-yard line for the touchdown with 11 seconds to go in the game. Seaman converted the extra point and Pitt led 29–26. Izo then completed a 50-yard pass to Red Mack, and Pitt tackled him on the 15-yard line as time ran out.

Pitt earned 16 first downs and gained 258 total yards. Three Pitt quarterbacks combined to complete 5 of 12 passes for 75 yards. Fred Riddle (36 yards), Jim Cunningham (35 yards) and Curt Plowman (31 yards) were the leading Pitt rushers. Notre Dame had 20 first downs and gained 415 total yards. Irish quarterback George Izo completed 18 of 26 passes for 332 yards. Nick Pietrosante gained 71 yards rushing. Defensively, Pitt recovered 5 of 7 Notre Dame fumbles and intercepted 1 pass. Notre Dame intercepted 2 passes and recovered 2 of 4 Pitt fumbles.

The Pitt starting lineup for the game against Notre Dame was Mike Ditka (left end), Ken Montanari (left tackle), Norton Seaman (left guard), Don Crafton (center), Ed Michaels (right guard), Bill Lindner (right tackle), Art Gob (right end), Ivan Toncic (quarterback), Dick Haley (left halfback), Joe Scisly (right halfback) and Jim Cunningham (fullback). Substitutes appearing in the game for Pitt were Jim Zanos, Joe Pullekines, Bob Rathi, Ron Delfine, Dick Mills, Bob Longfellow, John Guzik, Serafino Fazio, Henry Suffoletta, Ernie Westwood, Bill Kaliden, Ed Sharockman, John Flara, Curt Plowman and Fred Riddle.

=== at Nebraska ===
Week 9: Pitt at Nebraska

Team	1	2	3	4	Total
Pitt	0	0	0	6	6
• Nebraska	0	6	8	0	14

- Date: November 15, 1958
- Location: Memorial Stadium
  Lincoln, NE
- Game start: 1:30 p.m.
- Game attendance: 24,107
- Game weather: chilly and cloudy
- Referee: Clay Van Reen (Bradley)

Scoring summary
2	NEBR	Mike Eger 10-yard pass from Larry Naviaux (kick failed)	NEBR 6–0
3	NEBR	Pat Fischer 2-yard pass from Naviaux (Naviaux pass from Fischer)	NEBR 14–0
4	PITT	Dick Haley 35-yard pass from Bill Kaliden (pass failed)	NEBR 14–6

The final road trip of the season took the Panthers to Lincoln, NE to play the Nebraska Cornhuskers. Coach Bill Jennings' Huskers were 2–6 on the season. Nebraska trailed in the all-time series 3–15–3 and had never beaten Pitt at home.

The Panthers were ranked #14 and favored by 20 points. Athletic Director Tom Hamilton was questioned all week about Bowl offers. Meanwhile, starting end Art Gob (concussion) and starting tackle Bill Lindner (ankle) did not make the trip. Coach Michelosen replaced them with end Bob Rathi and tackle Ernie Westwood, and reinserted a healthy Fred Riddle at fullback. Sophomores Mike Ditka and Curt Plowman remained in the starting lineup.

In front of 24,107 Nebraska fans, the Cornhuskers upset the Pitt Panthers 14–6. The Panthers' offense was ineffective for three quarters. On the third play of the second quarter, Nebraska's Dick McCashland intercepted a Bill Kaliden pass, giving the Huskers possession on the Pitt 42-yard line. They scored in 6 plays. The touchdown came on a 10-yard pass from Larry Naviaux to Mike Eger. George Harshman's extra point was wide. Nebraska regained possession and drove to the Panthers' 1-yard line, where Pitt managed to take over on downs. Nebraska led 6–0 at halftime. In the third quarter, the Panthers drove to the Husker 16-yard line but lost possession on downs. After an exchange of punts Nebraska gained possession on the Pitt 42-yard line. On fourth down from the 2-yard line Naviaux passed to Pat Fischer for the touchdown. The two point conversion was converted on a pass from Fischer to Naviaux and Pitt trailed 14–0. Pitt took the ensuing kick-off, and marched to the Huskers 5-yard line and lost the ball on downs. The Panthers regained possession on the Huskers 35-yard line. On first down Kaliden connected with Dick Haley for a 35-yard touchdown. The 2-point conversion failed. Pitt regained possession with 2 minutes remaining and drove to the Nebraska 23-yard line. With 11 seconds left, Kaliden completed a pass to John Flara on the 14-yard line, and while he was being tackled, he fumbled a lateral, which Nebraska recovered.

Quarterback Ivan Toncic told the Sunday Journal and Star: “There goes the whole season..... We couldn't do anything right. That was the worst game we ever played, anywhere, anytime.”

The Pitt starting lineup for the game against Nebraska was Mike Ditka (left end), Ken Montanari (left tackle), John Guzik (left guard), Don Crafton (center), Ed Michaels (right guard), Ernie Westwood (right tackle), Bob Rathi (right end), Ivan Toncic (quarterback), Dick Haley (left halfback), Curt Plowman (right halfback) and Fred Riddle (fullback). Substitutes appearing in the game for Pitt were Jim Zanos, Joe Pullekines, Ron Delfine, Paul Stolitza, Dick Mills, David Walker, Bob Longfellow, Norton Seaman, Serafino Fazio, Henry Suffoletta, Ed Fornadel, Bill Kaliden, John Flara, Chuck Reinhold, Joe Scisly and Jim Cunningham.

=== Penn State ===
Week 10: Penn State at Pitt

Team	1	2	3	4	Total
• Penn State	0	0	12	13	25
Pitt	7	7	7	0	21

- Date: November 27, 1958
- Location: Pitt Stadium
  Pittsburgh, PA
- Game start: 1:30 p.m.
- Game attendance: 39,479
- Game weather: windy and cold
- Referee: Gerald F. Hogan (Arkansas)

Scoring summary
1	PITT	Ed Sharockman 50-yard run (Norton Seaman kick)	PITT 7–0
2	PITT	Joe Scisly 2-yard run ( Seaman kick)	PITT 14–0
3	PSU	Pat Botula 1-yard run ( pass failed)	PITT 14–6
3	PSU	Norm Neff 8-yard pass from Dick Hoak ( pass failed)	PITT 14–12
3	PITT	Chuck Reinhold 52-yard run (Seaman kick)	PITT 21–12
4	PSU	Neff 9-yard pass from Al Jacks (pass failed)	PITT 21–18
4	PSU	Don Jonas 10-yard run (Jonas kick)	PSU 25–21

The 1958 Pitt versus Penn State game was the first Thanksgiving Day football game in Pittsburgh in 23 years and was the official start of the Pittsburgh Bicentennial celebration. Both teams were 5–3–1, and Pitt led the all-time series 32–22–3. This was the final Pitt game for eleven seniors: Jim Zanos, Art Gob, Joe Pullekines, Fred Stolitza, Ed Michaels, John Guzik, Don Crafton, Bill Kaliden, Dick Haley, John Flara and Bob Stark. Coach Michelosen told The Pitt News: “We will certainly miss all eleven of these fine players.” Several Panthers were still nursing injuries and could not play: end Art Gob (concussion), tackle Fritz Walker (knee), guard Bob Longfellow and fullback Bob Stark. Tackles Bill Lindner (ankle) and Ernie Westwood (shoulder) were able to play. The injury-riddled Panthers roster lost quarterback Bill Kaliden to an attack of pleurisy right before kick-off.

Penn State staged a fourth quarter rally and defeated the Panthers 25–21. Pitt scored two first half touchdowns to lead 14–0 at halftime. Third-string quarterback Ed Sharockman raced 50 yards to cap a 79-yard drive in the first quarter. Joe Scisly scored on a 3-yard run to finalize an 82-yard drive in the second period. Norton Seaman converted both extra points. State got on the scoreboard first in the third quarter. Mike Ditka fumbled the snap in punt formation and Penn State gained possession on the Panthers 25-yard line. On the fifth play, Pat Botula plunged over from the 1-yard line. The two point conversion pass was incomplete. Panthers fullback Fred Riddle fumbled on the Panthers 32-yard line. Penn State recovered and scored in 4 plays on an 8-yard pass from Dick Hoak to Norm Neff. The conversion pass failed again and Pitt led 14–12. Pitt answered with a 66-yard scoring drive highlighted by Chuck Reinhold's 52-yard touchdown run. Seaman converted and Pitt led 21–12. Late in the second quarter, quarterback Ivan Toncic hurt his hip and was limping. His back-up Ed Sharockman broke his nose in the third quarter. Pitt gained a total of 14 yards in the final period, while Penn State scored two touchdowns. Reinhold fumbled a punt and State recovered on the Panthers 36-yard line. Neff scored on a 9-yard pass from Al Jacks. The conversion attempt failed again, and Pitt still led 21–18. State halfback Jim Kerr returned Fred Riddle's punt 43-yards to the Panthers 28-yard line. Don Jonas ran the final 9-yards around end for the touchdown, and he booted the extra point. The Pitt offense could not answer.

Coach Michelosen told the Post-Gazette: “Circumstances ruined us. Our injuries were critical, we ran out of quarterbacks. Bill Kaliden showed up for the game with pleurisy. In the second quarter Toncic hurt his hip. Then Sharockman got smacked in the nose and knocked out. I sent Toncic back in later even though he was limping. I knew our offense would be limited but he could hand the ball off and maybe move us.”

The Pitt starting lineup for the game against Penn State was Mike Ditka (left end), Ken Montanari (left tackle), John Guzik (left guard), Don Crafton (center), Ed Michaels (right guard), Dick Mills (right tackle), Jim Zanos (right end), Ivan Toncic (quarterback), Dick Haley (left halfback), Curt Plowman (right halfback) and Fred Riddle (fullback). Substitutes appearing in the game for Pitt were Joe Pullekines, Ron Delfine, Bob Rathi, Paul Stolitza, Ernie Westwood, Leonard Vella, Bill Lindner, Norton Seaman, Serafino Fazio, Mike Lucci, Henry Suffoletta, Ed Sharockman, Peter Prince, John Flara, Chuck Reinhold, Joe Scisly and Jim Cunningham.

== Postseason ==
Guard John Guzik was named a consensus All-American.

Coach John Michelosen was named as an assistant coach for the East squad in the annual East-West Shrine game in San Francisco on December 27. Three members of his Panthers squad were on the roster: guard John Guzik, end Art Gob and halfback Dick Haley.

On February 7, Guzik started 6 months of Army duty. After basic training he was assigned to Fort Knox and expected to be discharged in July. He was selected to play for the College All-Stars team, along with teammate Dick Haley, in the annual game against the NFL champions (Baltimore Colts). The game was played in Soldiers Field, Chicago on August 14. He then joined the Los Angeles Rams in training camp.

== Coaching staff ==
1958 Pittsburgh Panthers football staff
Coaching staff: John Michelosen – head coach; Jack Wiley – head line coach; Victor Fusia –quarterback coach; Carl DePasqua – backfield coach (scout); Robert Timmons – backfield coach; Ernie Hefferle – end coach (scout); Steve Petro – guard coach; Walter Cummins– freshmen assistant; Lou Cecconi – freshmen coach	Support staff: Thomas J. Hamilton – athletic director; Walter P. Cummins – assistant athletic director; Carroll Cook– athletic publicity director; Frank Carver – graduate manager; Howard Waite – trainer; Roger McGill – assistant trainer; John L. Sullivan – student manager

== Roster ==
1958 Pittsburgh Panthers football roster
Player	Position	Games	Weight	Height	Class	Prep School	Hometown
Marty Baracca	fullback	3	191	5 ft 11 in	sophomore	Blairsville H. S.	Blairsville, PA
Frank Boggs	halfback	0	185	6 ft	sophomore	Carrollton H. S.	Carrollton, OH
Ed Bombich	guard	0	208	6 ft	sophomore	South H. S.	Pittsburgh, PA
Bob Clemens	halfback	0	188	6 ft	sophomore	West Mifflin H. S.	Munhall, PA
Al Corfield	guard	2	192	5 ft 11 in	sophomore	Sharpsburg H. S.	Sharpsburg, PA
Fred Cox	halfback	0	188	5 ft 11 in	sophomore	Monongahela H. S.	Monongahela, PA
Don Crafton*	guard	10	195	6 ft	senior	Donora H. S.	Donora, PA
Jim Cunningham*	fullback	9	205	5 ft 11 in	sophomore	Connellsville H. S.	Connellsville, PA
Ron Delfine*	end	9	190	6 ft	sophomore	Canonsburg H. S.	Canonsburg, PA
Mike Ditka*	end	10	208	6 ft 2 in	sophomore	Aliquippa H. S.	Aliquippa, PA
Dennis Dvorchak	guard	0	210	6 ft 2 in	sophomore	South Union H. S.	Uniontown, PA
Ron Dzadony	tackle	0	208	6 ft 2 in	junior	Stowe H. S.	Stowe Township, PA
Serafino Fazio*	center	10	209	5 ft 11 in	junior	Coraopolis H. S.	Coraopolis, PA
John Flara*	halfback	10	175	5 ft 10 in	senior	Midland H. S.	Midland, PA
Ed Fornadel	tackle	3	220	6 ft 1 in	sophomore	Beaverdale H. S.	Beaverdale, PA
Art Gob*	end	7	215	6 ft 4 in	senior	Baldwin H. S.	Baldwin, PA
Bob Guzik	guard	0	205	6 ft 2 in	sophomore	Cecil Twp. H. S.	Lawrence., PA
John Guzik*	guard	10	223	6 ft 3 in	senior	Cecil Twp. H. S.	Lawrence, PA
Dick Haley*	halfback	9	185	5 ft 10 in	senior	Midway H. S.	Midway, PA
Paul Hodge	guard	0	205	6 ft 2 in	sophomore	Portage H. S.	Portage, PA
Stave Jaztrzembski	end	0	193	6 ft 2 in	sophomore	Vandergrift H. S.	Vandergrift, PA
Bill Kaliden*	quarterback	9	187	6 ft	senior	Homestead H. S.	Homestead, PA
Andy Kasic	halfback	0	165	5 ft 10 in	sophomore	West Newton H. S.	West Newton, PA
David Kraus	quarterback	0	191	6 ft 2 in	sophomore	Tridelphia H. S.	Wheeling, WVA
John Kuprok	end	0	205	6 ft 1 in	sophomore	Duquesne H. S.	Duquesne, PA
Bobby LaRue, Jr.	halfback	0	185	5 ft 10 in	sophomore	Kiski H. S.	Mt. Lebanon, PA
Bill Lindner*	tackle	9	215	6 ft 2 in	junior	Central Catholic H.S.	Pittsburgh, PA
Bob Longfellow*	guard	7	200	5 ft 11 in	junior	Freedom H.S.	Freedom, PA
Mike Lucci	center	4	207	6 ft 2 in	sophomore	Ambidge H. S.	Ambridge, PA
Charles Marranca	tackle	2	210	5 ft 11in	junior	Pittston H. S.	Pittston, PA
Dick Matyus	center	0	220	6 ft 2 in	sophomore	Shannock Valley H. S.	Yatesboro, PA
Elmer Merkovsky, Jr.	tackle	0	225	6 ft 2 in	sophomore	Wilmerding H. S.	Wilmerding, PA
Ed Michaels*	guard	10	196	5 ft 11 in	senior	Southside H. S.	Elmira, NY
Dick Mills*	tackle	10	230	6 ft 3 in	sophomore	Beaver H. S.	Beaver, PA
Ken Montanari*	tackle	10	200	6 ft 1 in	junior	Plum H. S.	Plum Borough, PA
Pat Morsillo	fullback	0	200	6 ft	sophomore	Ambridge H. S.	Ambridge, PA
Bob Navalance	center	0	186	6 ft	junior	Ambridge H. S.	Ambridge, PA
Ed Niedziejko	guard	0	210	6 ft 2in	sophomore	St. James H. S.	Chester, PA
Curt Plowman*	fullback	10	190	6 ft	junior	Altoona H. S.	Altoona, PA
Peter Prince	quarterback	3	175	5 ft 11 in	junior	Nashua H. S.	Nashua, NH
Joe Pullekines*	end	10	206	6 ft 2 in	senior	St. James H. S.	Woodlyn, PA
Mike Rago	guard	0	185	5 ft 10 in	junior	Carrick H. S.	Pittsburgh, PA
Bob Rathi*	end	7	195	6 ft 2 in	junior	Munhall H. S.	Elrama, PA
Chuck Reinhold*	halfback	7	173	6 ft 1 in	sophomore	Mt. Lebanon H. S.	Mt. Lebanon, PA
Fred Riddle*	fullback	10	195	6 ft	junior	Robinson Twp. H. S.	Crafton, PA
Tom Romanik	tackle	0	225	5 ft 10 in	senior	St. Vincent H. S.	Pittsburgh, PA
Gene Rosati	guard	0	210	6 ft 1 in	sophomore	Arnold H. S.	Arnold, PA
John Sakal	quarterback	0	193	6 ft 2 in	sophomore	Aliquippa H. S.	Aliquippa, PA
Joe Scisly*	halfback	10	180	6 ft	junior	Danville H. S.	Elysburg, PA
Norton Seaman*	guard	8	200	5 ft 10 in	junior	Hummelstown H. S.	Hummelstown, PA
Andy Sepsi*	halfback	4	192	5 ft 11 in	junior	Brownsville H. S.	Brownsville, PA
Ed Sharockman*	quarterback	8	182	6 ft	sophomore	St. Clair H. S.	St Clair, PA
Bob Stark	fullback	4	212	5 ft 11 in	senior	East McKeesport H. S.	McKeesport, PA
Paul Stolitza	end	2	200	6 ft 2 in	senior	Bethel H. S.	Bethel Park, PA
Henry Suffoletta*	guard	10	210	5 ft 11 in	junior	Midland H. S.	Midland, PA
Ray Tarisi	halfback	0	170	5 ft 10 in	sophomore	Kiski H. S.	Harmarville, PA
Ivan Toncic*	quarterback	9	178	5 ft 11 in	junior	Midland H. S.	Midland, PA
Leonard Vella	tackle	5	220	6 ft 4 in	sophomore	Pittston H. S.	Pittstone, PA
David Walker	end	4	215	6 ft 1 in	sophomore	Mt. Lebanon H. S.	Mt. Lebanon, PA
Ernie Westwood*	tackle	10	225	6 ft 2 in	sophomore	Clairton H. S.	Clairton, PA
Jim Zanos*	end	10	195	6 ft	junior	Munhall H.S.	Munhall, PA
* Letterman

== Individual scoring summary ==
1958 Pittsburgh Panthers scoring summary
Player	Touchdowns	Extra points	Two pointers	Field goals	Safety	Points
Dick Haley	6	0	1	0	0	38
Ivan Toncic	3	1	0	0	0	19
Bill Kaliden	3	0	0	0	0	18
Norton Seaman	0	9	0	2	0	15
Chuck Reinhold	2	0	0	0	0	12
John Flara	2	0	0	0	0	12
Mike Ditka	1	0	1	0	0	8
Art Gob	1	0	1	0	0	8
Ed Sharockman	1	0	0	0	0	6
Joe Scisly	1	0	0	0	0	6
Fred Riddle	1	0	0	0	0	6
Jim Cunningham	1	0	0	0	0	6
Jim Zanos	1	0	0	0	0	6
Ron Delfine	0	0	1	0	0	2
Marty Barraca	0	1	0	0	0	1
Totals	23	11	4	2	0	163

== Statistical leaders ==
Pittsburgh's individual statistical leaders for the 1958 season include those listed below.

=== Rushing ===
Player	Attempts	Net yards	Yards per attempt	Touchdowns
Dick Haley	93	311	3.3	4
Fred Riddle	105	310	3.0	1
Joe Scisly	72	266	3.7	1
Curt Plowman	51	206	4.0	0

=== Passing ===
Player	Attempts	Completions	Interceptions	Comp %	Yards	Yds/Comp	TD
Bill Kaliden	81	39	4	48.1	549	14.1	3
Ivan Toncic	69	49	8	71.0	641	13.1	4
Ed Sharockman	28	8	4	28.6	91	11.4	1

=== Receiving ===
Player	Receptions	Yards	Yds/Recp	TD
Mike Ditka	18	252	14.0	1
Dick Haley	14	232	16.6	2
Fred Riddle	12	117	9.8	0
Art Gob	11	174	15.8	1
Jim Zanos	11	102	9.3	1

=== Kickoff returns ===
Player	Returns	Yards	Yds/Return	TD
Dick Haley	6	133	22.2	0
Fred Riddle	6	122	20.3	0
Jim Cunnigham	4	84	21.0	0
Joe Scisly	4	60	15.0	0

=== Punt returns ===
Player	Returns	Yards	Yds/Return	TD
Dick Haley	9	134	14.9	0
Ed Sharockman	5	43	8.6	0
Bill Kaliden	4	38	9.5	0

== Team players drafted into the NFL ==
The following Panthers were selected in the 1959 NFL draft.

Player	Position	Round	Pick	NFL club
Dick Haley	DB	9	100	Washington Redskins
Tom Salwocki	Center	15	178	Cleveland Browns
Art Gob	DE	22	257	Washington Redskins
Jack Flara	HB	29	337	Green Bay Packers
