= 1958 Yale Bulldogs football team =

American college football season

1958 Yale Bulldogs football
- Conference: Ivy League
- Record: 2–7 (0–7 Ivy)
- Head coach: Jordan Olivar (7th season)
- Captain: Paul Lynch
- Home stadium: Yale Bowl

1958 Ivy League football standings
	Conf.					Overall
Team	W		L		T	W		L		T
Dartmouth $	6	–	1	–	0	7	–	2	–	0
Cornell	5	–	2	–	0	6	–	3	–	0
Princeton	5	–	2	–	0	6	–	3	–	0
Brown	4	–	3	–	0	6	–	3	–	0
Penn	4	–	3	–	0	4	–	5	–	0
Harvard	3	–	4	–	0	4	–	5	–	0
Columbia	1	–	6	–	0	1	–	8	–	0
Yale	0	–	7	–	0	2	–	7	–	0
$ – Conference champion

The 1958 Yale Bulldogs football team represented Yale University in the 1958 college football season. The Bulldogs were led by seventh-year head coach Jordan Olivar, played their home games at the Yale Bowl and finished the season with a 2–7 record.

== Schedule ==
Date	Opponent	Site	Result	Attendance	Source
September 27	Connecticut*	Yale Bowl; New Haven, CT	W 8–6	22,158	
October 4	at Brown	Brown Stadium; Providence, RI	L 29–35	17,600	
October 11	at Columbia	Baker Field; New York, NY	L 0–13	17,000	
October 18	Cornell	Yale Bowl; New Haven, CT	L 7–12	28,816	
October 25	Colgate*	Yale Bowl; New Haven, CT	W 14–7	20,328	
November 1	Dartmouth	Yale Bowl; New Haven, CT	L 14–22	42,240	
November 8	Penn	Yale Bowl; New Haven, CT	L 6–30	20,952	
November 15	Princeton	Yale Bowl; New Haven, CT (rivalry)	L 14–50	47,680	
November 22	at Harvard	Harvard Stadium; Boston, MA (The Game)	L 0–28	40,200	
*Non-conference game
