= 1958 Boston College Eagles football team =

American college football season

1958 Boston College Eagles football
- Conference: Independent
- Record: 7–3
- Head coach: Mike Holovak (8th season)
- Captain: George Larkin
- Home stadium: Alumni Stadium

1958 Eastern major college football independents records
	Conf.			Overall
Team	W	L	T	W		L		T
No. 3 Army		–		8	–	0	–	1
No. 9 Syracuse		–		8	–	2	–	0
Boston College		–		7	–	3	–	0
Holy Cross		–		6	–	3	–	0
Penn State		–		6	–	3	–	1
Villanova		–		6	–	4	–	0
Pittsburgh		–		5	–	4	–	1
Boston University		–		4	–	5	–	0
Colgate		–		1	–	8	–	0
Rankings from AP poll

The 1958 Boston College Eagles football team represented Boston College as an independent during the 1958 college football season. In its eighth season under head coach Mike Holovak, the team compiled a 7–3 record and outscored opponents by a total of 229 to 127.

The team allowed opponents an average of 194.2 yards of total offense per game (106.0 rushing yards and 88.2 passing yards). The defense also recovered 24 fumbles and gave up only 91 first downs in 10 games. All three figures remain Boston College season records.

The team's statistical leaders included quarterback Don Allard with 691 passing yards, Jim Duggan with 489 rushing yards, end Jim Colclough with 462 receiving yards, and end Jack Flanagan with 36 points scored.

Jack Flanagan also received the Thomas F. Scanlan Memorial Trophy as the senior player outstanding in scholarship, leadership, and athletic ability. Flanagan was also named to the first team of the All-New England football team. Tackle Steve Bennett was named to the second team.

Five members of the team went on to play in the National Football League or American Football League: Don Allard, Jim Colclough, Larry Eisenhauer, Alan Miller, and Ross O'Hanley.

The team played its home games at Alumni Stadium in Chestnut Hill, Massachusetts.

== Schedule ==
Date	Opponent	Site	Result	Attendance	Source
September 20	Scranton	Alumni Stadium; Chestnut Hill, MA	W 48–0	15,000	
September 27	at Syracuse	Archbold Stadium; Syracuse, NY	L 14–24	15,000	
October 4	Villanova	Alumni Stadium; Chestnut Hill, MA	L 19–21	12,000	
October 18	at Marquette	Milwaukee County Stadium; Milwaukee, WI	W 21–13	7,016	
October 25	Miami (FL)	Alumni Stadium; Chestnut Hill, MA	W 6–2	11,000	
November 1	Pacific (CA)	Alumni Stadium; Chestnut Hill, MA	W 25–12	16,000	
November 8	Detroit	Alumni Stadium; Chestnut Hill, MA	W 40–0	18,000	
November 15	Boston University	Alumni Stadium; Chestnut Hill, MA (rivalry)	W 18–13	22,000	
November 22	at No. 16 Clemson	Clemson Memorial Stadium; Clemson, SC (rivalry)	L 12–34	19,000	
December 6	Holy Cross	Alumni Stadium; Chestnut Hill, MA (rivalry)	W 26–8	26,000	
Rankings from AP Poll released prior to the game
