= 1958 Syracuse Orangemen football team =

American college football season

1958 Syracuse Orangemen football

Orange Bowl, L 6–21 vs. Oklahoma
- Conference: Independent

Ranking
- Coaches: No. 10
- AP: No. 9
- Record: 8–2
- Head coach: Ben Schwartzwalder (10th season)
- Captain: Chuck Zimmerman
- Home stadium: Archbold Stadium

1958 Eastern major college football independents records
	Conf.			Overall
Team	W	L	T	W		L		T
No. 3 Army		–		8	–	0	–	1
No. 9 Syracuse		–		8	–	2	–	0
Boston College		–		7	–	3	–	0
Holy Cross		–		6	–	3	–	0
Penn State		–		6	–	3	–	1
Villanova		–		6	–	4	–	0
Pittsburgh		–		5	–	4	–	1
Boston University		–		4	–	5	–	0
Colgate		–		1	–	8	–	0
Rankings from AP poll

The 1958 Syracuse Orangemen football team represented Syracuse University as an independent during the 1958 college football season. The Orangemen were led by tenth-year head coach Ben Schwartzwalder and played their home games at Archbold Stadium in Syracuse, New York. Syracuse finished the regular season ranked in the top 10 of both major polls after compiling a record of 8–1. They were invited to the 1959 Orange Bowl, where they were defeated by Oklahoma.

== Schedule ==
Date	Opponent	Rank	Site	Result	Attendance	Source
September 27	Boston College		Archbold Stadium; Syracuse, NY	W 24–14	15,000	
October 4	at Holy Cross		Fitton Field; Worcester, MA	L 13–14	18,000	
October 11	Cornell		Archbold Stadium; Syracuse, NY	W 55–0	24,000	
October 18	Nebraska		Archbold Stadium; Syracuse, NY	W 38–0	17,083	
October 25	at Penn State		New Beaver Field; University Park, PA (rivalry)	W 14–6	27,000	
November 1	No. 12 Pittsburgh		Archbold Stadium; Syracuse, NY	W 16–13	38,000	
November 7	at Boston University	No. 12	Boston University Field; Boston, MA	W 42–0	16,500	
November 15	Colgate	No. 12	Archbold Stadium; Syracuse, NY	W 47–0	30,000	
November 22	at West Virginia	No. 10	Mountaineer Field; Morgantown, WV (rivalry)	W 15–12	25,000	
January 1	vs. No. 5 Oklahoma	No. 9	Orange Bowl; Miami, FL (Orange Bowl)	L 6–21	75,281	
Rankings from AP Poll released prior to the game; Source:

Note: The game against Boston University was played at night.

== Game summaries ==
=== West Virginia ===
Team	1	2	3	4	Total
• Syracuse	8	7	0	0	15
West Virginia	6	0	6	0	12

- Date: November 22
- Location: Mountaineer Field, Morgantown, WV

Scoring summary
1	SYR	D. Baker 8 yard pass from Zimmerman (Keiffer run)	SYR 8-0
1	WV	Longfellow 2 yard run (run failed)	SYR 8-6
2	SYR	D. Baker 23 yard pass from Zimmerman (Gerlick kick)	SYR 15-6
4	WV	Williams 5 yard run (kick failed)	SYR 15-13
