= 1958 Princeton Tigers football team =

American college football season

1958 Princeton Tigers football
- Conference: Ivy League
- Record: 6–3 (5–2 Ivy)
- Head coach: Dick Colman (2nd season)
- Captain: Frederick W. Tiley
- Home stadium: Palmer Stadium

1958 Ivy League football standings
	Conf.					Overall
Team	W		L		T	W		L		T
Dartmouth $	6	–	1	–	0	7	–	2	–	0
Cornell	5	–	2	–	0	6	–	3	–	0
Princeton	5	–	2	–	0	6	–	3	–	0
Brown	4	–	3	–	0	6	–	3	–	0
Penn	4	–	3	–	0	4	–	5	–	0
Harvard	3	–	4	–	0	4	–	5	–	0
Columbia	1	–	6	–	0	1	–	8	–	0
Yale	0	–	7	–	0	2	–	7	–	0
$ – Conference champion

The 1958 Princeton Tigers football team was an American football team that represented Princeton University as a member of the Ivy League during the 1958 college football season.

In their second year under head coach Dick Colman, the Tigers compiled a 6–3 record and outscored opponents 217 to 164. Frederick W. Tiley was the team captain.

Princeton's 5–2 conference record tied for second place in the Ivy League. The Tigers outscored Ivy opponents 177 to 123.

Princeton played its home games at Palmer Stadium on the university campus in Princeton, New Jersey.

== Schedule ==
Date	Opponent	Site	Result	Attendance	Source
September 27	Rutgers*	Palmer Stadium; Princeton, NJ (rivalry)	L 0–28	26,000	
October 4	Columbia	Palmer Stadium; Princeton, NJ	W 43–8	16,500	
October 11	at Penn	Franklin Field; Philadelphia, PA (rivalry)	W 20–14	22,531	
October 18	Colgate*	Palmer Stadium; Princeton, NJ	W 40–13	23,500	
October 25	at Cornell	Schoellkopf Field; Ithaca, NY	L 8–34	23,000	
November 1	Brown	Palmer Stadium; Princeton, NJ	W 28–18	28,000	
November 8	Harvard	Palmer Stadium; Princeton, NJ (rivalry)	W 16–14	35,000	
November 15	at Yale	Yale Bowl; New Haven, CT (rivalry)	W 50–14	47,680	
November 22	Dartmouth	Palmer Stadium; Princeton, NJ	L 12–21	44,000	
*Non-conference game
