= 1958 Harvard Crimson football team =

American college football season

1958 Harvard Crimson football
- Conference: Ivy League
- Record: 4–5 (3–4 Ivy)
- Head coach: John Yovicsin (2nd season)
- Captain: Robert T. Shaunessy
- Home stadium: Harvard Stadium

1958 Ivy League football standings
	Conf.					Overall
Team	W		L		T	W		L		T
Dartmouth $	6	–	1	–	0	7	–	2	–	0
Cornell	5	–	2	–	0	6	–	3	–	0
Princeton	5	–	2	–	0	6	–	3	–	0
Brown	4	–	3	–	0	6	–	3	–	0
Penn	4	–	3	–	0	4	–	5	–	0
Harvard	3	–	4	–	0	4	–	5	–	0
Columbia	1	–	6	–	0	1	–	8	–	0
Yale	0	–	7	–	0	2	–	7	–	0
$ – Conference champion

The 1958 Harvard Crimson football team was an American football team that represented Harvard University as a member of the Ivy League during the 1958 college football season.

In their second year under head coach John Yovicsin, the Crimson compiled a 4–5 record and outscored opponents 149 to 99. Robert T. Shaunessy was the team captain.

Harvard's 3–4 conference record placed sixth in the Ivy League. The Crimson outscored Ivy opponents 126 to 93.

Harvard played its home games at Harvard Stadium in the Allston neighborhood of Boston, Massachusetts.

== Schedule ==
Date	Opponent	Site	Result	Attendance	Source
September 27	Buffalo*	Harvard Stadium; Boston, MA	L 3–6	6,000	
October 4	at Cornell	Schoellkopf Field; Ithaca, NY	L 14–21	15,000	
October 11	Lehigh*	Harvard Stadium; Boston, MA	W 20–0	9,000	
October 18	at Columbia	Baker Field; New York, NY	W 26–0	23,000	
October 25	Dartmouth	Harvard Stadium; Boston, MA (rivalry)	W 16–8	22,500	
November 1	Penn	Harvard Stadium; Boston, MA (rivalry)	L 6–19	16,500	
November 8	at Princeton	Palmer Stadium; Princeton, NJ (rivalry)	L 14–16	35,000	
November 15	Brown	Harvard Stadium; Boston, MA	L 22–29	15,000	
November 22	Yale	Harvard Stadium; Boston, MA (The Game)	W 28–0	40,200	
*Non-conference game
