= 1958 Penn Quakers football team =

American college football season

1958 Penn Quakers football
- Conference: Ivy League
- Record: 4–5 (4–3 Ivy)
- Head coach: Steve Sebo (5th season)
- Captain: Ray Kelly
- Home stadium: Franklin Field

1958 Ivy League football standings
	Conf.					Overall
Team	W		L		T	W		L		T
Dartmouth $	6	–	1	–	0	7	–	2	–	0
Cornell	5	–	2	–	0	6	–	3	–	0
Princeton	5	–	2	–	0	6	–	3	–	0
Brown	4	–	3	–	0	6	–	3	–	0
Penn	4	–	3	–	0	4	–	5	–	0
Harvard	3	–	4	–	0	4	–	5	–	0
Columbia	1	–	6	–	0	1	–	8	–	0
Yale	0	–	7	–	0	2	–	7	–	0
$ – Conference champion

The 1958 Penn Quakers football team was an American football team that represented the University of Pennsylvania as a member of the Ivy League during the 1958 college football season.

In their fifth year under head coach Steve Sebo, the Quakers compiled a 4–5 record and were outscored 177 to 153. Ray Kelly was the team captain.

Penn's 4–3 conference record tied for fourth place in the Ivy League. The Quakers outscored their Ivy opponents 145 to 84.

Penn played its home games at Franklin Field adjacent to the university's campus in Philadelphia, Pennsylvania.

== Schedule ==
Date	Opponent	Site	Result	Attendance	Source
September 27	Penn State*	Franklin Field; Philadelphia, PA	L 0–43	19,549	
October 4	at Dartmouth	Memorial Field; Hanover, NH	L 12–13	12,500	
October 11	Princeton	Franklin Field; Philadelphia, PA (rivalry)	L 14–20	22,531	
October 18	Brown	Franklin Field; Philadelphia, PA	W 21–20	16,921	
October 25	No. 18 Navy*	Franklin Field; Philadelphia, PA	L 8–50	18,914	
November 1	at Harvard	Harvard Stadium; Boston, MA (rivalry)	W 19–6	16,500	
November 8	at Yale	Yale Bowl; New Haven, CT	W 30–6	20,952	
November 15	Columbia	Franklin Field; Philadelphia, PA	W 42–0	17,817	
November 27	Cornell	Franklin Field; Philadelphia, PA (rivalry)	L 7–19	19,116	
*Non-conference game; Rankings from AP Poll released prior to the game
