= 1958 Dartmouth Indians football team =

American college football season

1958 Dartmouth Indians football

Ivy League champion
- Conference: Ivy League
- Record: 7–2 (6–4 Ivy)
- Head coach: Bob Blackman (4th season)
- Captain: Alvin Krutsch
- Home stadium: Memorial Field

1958 Ivy League football standings
	Conf.					Overall
Team	W		L		T	W		L		T
Dartmouth $	6	–	1	–	0	7	–	2	–	0
Cornell	5	–	2	–	0	6	–	3	–	0
Princeton	5	–	2	–	0	6	–	3	–	0
Brown	4	–	3	–	0	6	–	3	–	0
Penn	4	–	3	–	0	4	–	5	–	0
Harvard	3	–	4	–	0	4	–	5	–	0
Columbia	1	–	6	–	0	1	–	8	–	0
Yale	0	–	7	–	0	2	–	7	–	0
$ – Conference champion

The 1958 Dartmouth Indians football team was an American football team that represented Dartmouth College as a member of the Ivy League during the 1958 college football season.

In their fourth season under head coach Bob Blackman, the Indians won the Ivy League. They compiled a 7–2 record and outscored opponents 182 to 83. Alvin Krutsch was the team captain.

The Indians' 6–1 conference record was the best in the Ivy League. They outscored Ivy opponents 154 to 69.

Dartmouth played its home games at Memorial Field on the college campus in Hanover, New Hampshire.

== Schedule ==
Date	Opponent	Site	Result	Attendance	Source
September 27	Lafayette*	Memorial Field; Hanover, NH	W 20–0	5,000	
October 4	Penn	Memorial Field; Hanover, NH	W 13–12	12,500	
October 11	at Brown	Brown Stadium; Providence, RI	W 20–0	17,000	
October 18	Holy Cross*	Memorial Field; Hanover, NH	L 8–14	14,000	
October 25	at Harvard	Harvard Stadium; Boston, MA (rivalry)	L 8–16	22,500	
November 1	at Yale	Yale Bowl; New Haven, CT	W 22–14	42,240	
November 8	Columbia	Memorial Field; Hanover, NH	W 38–0	9,000	
November 15	at Cornell	Schoellkopf Field; Ithaca, NY (rivalry)	W 32–15	16,000	
November 22	at Princeton	Palmer Stadium; Princeton, NJ	W 21–12	44,000	
*Non-conference game
