= 1958 Drexel Dragons football team =

American college football season

1958 Drexel Dragons football
- Conference: Middle Atlantic Conference
- Southern College Division
- Record: 1–7 (1–5 MAC)
- Head coach: Jack Hinkle (1st season)
- Home stadium: Drexel Field

1958 Middle Atlantic Conference football standings
	Conf.					Overall
Team	W		L		T	W		L		T
University Division
No. 20 Rutgers x	4	–	0	–	0	8	–	1	–	0
Lafayette	5	–	1	–	1	5	–	3	–	1
Gettysburg	3	–	1	–	1	7	–	1	–	1
Lehigh	2	–	1	–	2	3	–	3	–	3
Delaware	2	–	3	–	0	5	–	3	–	0
Bucknell	1	–	5	–	0	1	–	8	–	0
Temple	0	–	5	–	0	0	–	8	–	0
Muhlenberg *	1	–	2	–	0	4	–	4	–	0
Northern College Division
Juniata x	6	–	0	–	0	7	–	0	–	1
Lycoming	4	–	1	–	0	7	–	1	–	0
Lebanon Valley	3	–	1	–	1	4	–	3	–	1
Susquehanna	3	–	2	–	0	3	–	4	–	0
Moravian	3	–	3	–	0	4	–	4	–	0
Wagner	3	–	3	–	0	3	–	5	–	0
Dickinson	3	–	4	–	0	4	–	4	–	0
Albright	2	–	4	–	1	2	–	6	–	1
Wilkes	1	–	7	–	0	1	–	8	–	0
Scranton *	2	–	2	–	0	5	–	3	–	0
Southern College Division
Pennsylvania Military x	7	–	1	–	0	7	–	2	–	0
Johns Hopkins	5	–	1	–	0	5	–	3	–	0
Haverford	4	–	2	–	0	4	–	3	–	0
Western Maryland	1	–	4	–	0	3	–	6	–	0
Swarthmore	1	–	4	–	0	1	–	7	–	0
Drexel	1	–	5	–	0	1	–	7	–	0
Ursinus	0	–	8	–	0	0	–	8	–	0
West Chester *	1	–	0	–	0	9	–	1	–	0
Franklin & Marshall *	3	–	1	–	0	5	–	4	–	0
x – Division champion/co-champions; * – Ineligible for championship due to insufficient conference games; Rankings from AP Poll

The 1958 Drexel Dragons football team represented the Drexel Institute of Technology (renamed Drexel University in 1970) as a member of the Middle Atlantic Conference during the 1958 college football season. Jack Hinkle was the team's head coach.

== Schedule ==
Date	Time	Opponent	Site	Result	Attendance
September 27		Albright	Drexel Field; Philadelphia, PA	L 0–21	1,000
October 4		at National Agricultural*		L 8–13	
October 11		at Gettysburg*	Memorial Field; Gettysburg, PA	L 0–27	
October 18		West Chester	Drexel Field; Philadelphia, PA	L 0–51	1,000
October 25		Pennsylvania Military^{†}	Drexel Field; Philadelphia, PA	L 6–15	1,000
November 1		at Scranton	Scranton Memorial Stadium; Scranton, PA	L 14–33	
November 8	1:30 pm	at Juniata	College Field; Huntingdon, PA	L 0–52	
November 15		Western Maryland	Drexel Field; Philadelphia, PA	W 20–0	700
*Non-conference game; ^{†}Homecoming; All times are in Eastern time

== Roster ==
1958 Drexel Dragons football team roster
Players
Coaches
Offense

Pos.	#	Name	Class
TE		Bill Alter (C)
TE		Bomer
TE		Jack Geary
TE		Charlie Paul
TE		John Lesniewski
OT		Frank Garofolo
OT		Ron Bales
OT		Walt Danz
OT		Ray Miller
G		Don Whitney
G		Bob DeColli
G		Ron Kidd
G		Dick Frazier
C		Ed Schmidt (C)
C		Dick Cole
HB		Joe Zador
HB		Frank Bell
HB		John Maloney
HB		Ken Suter
HB		Harry O'Neil
FB		Pat Brett
FB		Mike Piernock
QB		Tom O'Connor
QB		Jim Holden

Defense

Pos.	#	Name	Class

Special teams

Pos.	#	Name	Class

Head coach

- Jack Hinkle (Syracuse)

Coordinators/assistant coaches

- Ben Kish (Pittsburgh)
- Vince Vidas (Drexel)
- Ron Kleppinger (Drexel)

Legend

- (C) Team captain
- (S) Suspended
- (I) Ineligible
- Injured
- Redshirt
