= 1958 Maine Black Bears football team =

American college football season

1958 Maine Black Bears football
- Conference: Yankee Conference, Maine Intercollegiate Athletic Association
- Record: 6–2 (4–1 Yankee, 2–1 MIAA)
- Head coach: Harold Westerman (8th season)
- Captain: Niles Nelson
- Home stadium: Alumni Field

1958 Yankee Conference football standings
	Conf.					Overall
Team	W		L		T	W		L		T
No. 12 Connecticut $	4	–	0	–	0	7	–	3	–	0
Maine	3	–	1	–	0	6	–	2	–	0
Rhode Island	2	–	2	–	0	4	–	4	–	0
UMass	1	–	3	–	0	2	–	6	–	0
Vermont	0	–	1	–	0	2	–	4	–	1
New Hampshire	0	–	4	–	0	2	–	6	–	0
$ – Conference champion; Rankings from UPI small college poll

The 1958 Maine Black Bears football team was an American football team that represented the University of Maine as a member of the Yankee Conference and Maine Intercollegiate Athletic Association during the 1958 college football season. In its eighth season under head coach Harold Westerman, the team compiled a 6–2 record (4–1 against Yankee Conference and 2–1 against MIAA opponents) and finished second out of the six teams in the Yankee Conference. The team played its home games at Alumni Field in Orono, Maine. Niles Nelson was the team captain.

The team's statistical leaders included left halfback John Welch with 472 rushing yards; quarterback Bob Pickett with 384 passing yards; end John Theriault with 149 receiving yards; and right halfback Wayne Champeon with 34 points scored (five touchdowns and two two-point conversions).

== Schedule ==
Date	Opponent	Site	Result	Attendance	Source
September 20	UMass	Alumni Field; Orono, ME	W 19–6	4,700	
September 27	Rhode Island	Alumni Field; Orono, ME	W 37–8	4,000–4,500	
October 4	at Vermont	Centennial Field; Burlington, VT	W 26–0	5,000	
October 11	New Hampshire	Alumni Field; Orono, ME (rivalry)	W 14–0	5,000	
October 18	at Connecticut	Memorial Stadium; Storrs, CT	L 6–21	13,359	
October 25	Bates	Alumni Field; Orono, ME	W 40–0	6,662	
November 1	Colby	Alumni Field; Orono, ME	L 12–16	7,748	
November 8	at Bowdoin	Whittier Field; Brunswick, ME	W 37–0	5,000	

== After the season ==
The following Black Bear was selected in the 1959 NFL draft after the season.

Round	Pick	Player	Position	NFL club
14	166	Roger Ellis	Center	New York Giants
