= 1958 Delaware Fightin' Blue Hens football team =

American college football season

1958 Delaware Fightin' Blue Hens football
- Conference: Middle Atlantic Conference
- University Division
- Record: 5–3 (2–3 MAC)
- Head coach: David M. Nelson (8th season)
- Captain: Robert Jones
- Home stadium: Delaware Stadium

1958 Middle Atlantic Conference football standings
	Conf.					Overall
Team	W		L		T	W		L		T
University Division
No. 20 Rutgers x	4	–	0	–	0	8	–	1	–	0
Lafayette	5	–	1	–	1	5	–	3	–	1
Gettysburg	3	–	1	–	1	7	–	1	–	1
Lehigh	2	–	1	–	2	3	–	3	–	3
Delaware	2	–	3	–	0	5	–	3	–	0
Bucknell	1	–	5	–	0	1	–	8	–	0
Temple	0	–	5	–	0	0	–	8	–	0
Muhlenberg *	1	–	2	–	0	4	–	4	–	0
Northern College Division
Juniata x	6	–	0	–	0	7	–	0	–	1
Lycoming	4	–	1	–	0	7	–	1	–	0
Lebanon Valley	3	–	1	–	1	4	–	3	–	1
Susquehanna	3	–	2	–	0	3	–	4	–	0
Moravian	3	–	3	–	0	4	–	4	–	0
Wagner	3	–	3	–	0	3	–	5	–	0
Dickinson	3	–	4	–	0	4	–	4	–	0
Albright	2	–	4	–	1	2	–	6	–	1
Wilkes	1	–	7	–	0	1	–	8	–	0
Scranton *	2	–	2	–	0	5	–	3	–	0
Southern College Division
Pennsylvania Military x	7	–	1	–	0	7	–	2	–	0
Johns Hopkins	5	–	1	–	0	5	–	3	–	0
Haverford	4	–	2	–	0	4	–	3	–	0
Western Maryland	1	–	4	–	0	3	–	6	–	0
Swarthmore	1	–	4	–	0	1	–	7	–	0
Drexel	1	–	5	–	0	1	–	7	–	0
Ursinus	0	–	8	–	0	0	–	8	–	0
West Chester *	1	–	0	–	0	9	–	1	–	0
Franklin & Marshall *	3	–	1	–	0	5	–	4	–	0
x – Division champion/co-champions; * – Ineligible for championship due to insufficient conference games; Rankings from AP Poll

The 1958 Delaware Fightin' Blue Hens football team was an American football team that represented the University of Delaware in the Middle Atlantic Conference (MAC) during the 1958 college football season. In its eighth season under head coach David M. Nelson, the team compiled a 5–3 record (2–3 against MAC opponents) and outscored opponents by a total of 188 to 102. Robert Jones was the team captain. The team played its home games at Delaware Stadium in Newark, Delaware.

== Schedule ==
Date	Opponent	Rank	Site	Result	Attendance	Source
September 27	at Lehigh	No. 15	Taylor Stadium; Bethlehem, PA (rivalry)	L 7–8	5,000–6,200	
October 4	Temple		Temple Stadium; Philadelphia, PA	W 35–14	3,500	
October 11	Lafayette	No. 13	Delaware Stadium; Newark, DE	L 6–7	5,181	
October 18	at New Hampshire*		Cowell Stadium; Durham, NH	W 36–14	6,000–6,500	
October 25	No. 2 Connecticut^{†}*		Delaware Stadium; Newark, DE	W 28–0	5,184	
November 1	Rutgers	No. 14	Delaware Stadium; Newark, DE	L 20–37	8,600	
November 8	UMass*		Delaware Stadium; Newark, DE	W 28–14	5,482	
November 15	Bucknell		Delaware Stadium; Newark, DE	W 28–8	4,464–4,500	
*Non-conference game; ^{†}Homecoming; Rankings from UPI Poll released prior to the game
