= Fred Rice =

American football player and coach (1918–2005)

Fred J. Rice
Biographical details
- Born: November 10, 1918
- Died: March 8, 2005 (aged 86)

Playing career
- 1939–1941: Marquette
- Positions: Fullback, linebacker

Coaching career (HC unless noted)
- c. 1950: Marquette (freshmen)
- 1952–1956: Colgate (backfield)
- 1957–1958: Colgate
- 1959–1960: Marquette (assistant)
- 1961–1975: Nicolet HS (WI)

Head coaching record
- Overall: 4–14 (college); 70–53–9 (high school)

Fredrick John William Rice (November 10, 1918 – March 8, 2005) was an American football coach. He served as head football coach at Colgate University for two seasons, from 1957 until 1958, compiling a record of 4–14. After leaving Colgate, Rice was the head coach at Nicolet High School in Glendale, Wisconsin from 1961 to 1975, where he posted a 70–53–9 record and won a Braveland Conference championship in 1966.

== Head coaching record ==
=== College ===
Year	Team	Overall	Conference	Standing	Bowl/playoffs
Colgate Red Raiders (Independent) (1957–1958)
1957	Colgate	3–6			
1958	Colgate	1–8			
Colgate:		4–14			
Total:		4–14			
