= 1958 Army Cadets football team =

American college football season

1958 Army Cadets football

Eastern champion
- Conference: Independent

Ranking
- Coaches: No. 3
- AP: No. 3
- Record: 8–0–1
- Head coach: Earl Blaik (18th season)
- Captain: Pete Dawkins
- Home stadium: Michie Stadium

1958 Eastern major college football independents records
	Conf.			Overall
Team	W	L	T	W		L		T
No. 3 Army		–		8	–	0	–	1
No. 9 Syracuse		–		8	–	2	–	0
Boston College		–		7	–	3	–	0
Holy Cross		–		6	–	3	–	0
Penn State		–		6	–	3	–	1
Villanova		–		6	–	4	–	0
Pittsburgh		–		5	–	4	–	1
Boston University		–		4	–	5	–	0
Colgate		–		1	–	8	–	0
Rankings from AP poll

The 1958 Army Cadets football team represented the United States Military Academy as an independent during the 1958 college football season. Led by head coach Earl Blaik, the team finished with an undefeated 8–0–1 season. The Cadets' offense scored 264 points, while the defense allowed 49 points. At season's end, the team was third in the national rankings.

== Schedule ==
Date	Time	Opponent	Rank	Site	TV	Result	Attendance	Source
September 27		No. 18 South Carolina	No. 8	Michie Stadium; West Point, NY		W 45–8	16,250–20,000	
October 4		Penn State	No. 5	Michie Stadium; West Point, NY		W 26–0	27,250	
October 11		at No. 4 Notre Dame	No. 3	Notre Dame Stadium; Notre Dame, IN (rivalry)		W 14–2	60,564	
October 18		Virginia^{†}	No. 1	Michie Stadium; West Point, NY		W 35–6	27,250	
October 25		at Pittsburgh	No. 1	Pitt Stadium; Pittsburgh, PA	NBC	T 14–14	50,287	
November 1		Colgate	No. 3	Michie Stadium; West Point, NY		W 68–6	24,750	
November 8		at No. 13 Rice	No. 3	Rice Stadium; Houston, TX		W 14–7	69,000	
November 15		Villanova	No. 3	Michie Stadium; West Point, NY		W 26–0	27,250	
November 29	1:15 p.m.	vs. Navy	No. 5	Philadelphia Municipal Stadium; Philadelphia, PA (Army–Navy Game)	NBC	W 22–6	102,000	
^{†}Homecoming; Rankings from AP Poll released prior to the game; All times are in Eastern time; Source:

== Game summaries ==
=== Notre Dame ===
	1	2	3	4	Total
Army	6	0	8	0	14
Notre Dame	0	2	0	0	2

Army's last win versus Notre Dame to date.

=== Navy ===
In the annual Army–Navy Game, on November 29 in Philadelphia, Army beat Navy by a score of 22–6.

	1	2	3	4	Total
Army	0	7	0	15	22
Navy	6	0	0	0	6

== Roster ==
1958 Army Cadets football team roster
Players
Coaches
Offense

Pos.	#	Name	Class
QB		Joe Caldwell	Jr
HB		Pete Dawkins	Sr
G		Bob Novogratz

Defense

Pos.	#	Name	Class

Special teams

Pos.	#	Name	Class

Head coach

- Earl Blaik

Coordinators/assistant coaches

Legend

- (C) Team captain
- (S) Suspended
- (I) Ineligible
- Injured
- Redshirt

== Awards and honors ==
- Pete Dawkins: Heisman Trophy, Maxwell Award

== Team players drafted into the NFL ==
Player	Position	Round	Pick	NFL club
Bob Novagratz	Guard	24	288	Baltimore Colts
