= 1958 Rhode Island Rams football team =

American college football season

1958 Rhode Island Rams football
- Conference: Yankee Conference
- Record: 4–4 (2–2 Yankee)
- Head coach: Herb Maack (3rd season)
- Home stadium: Meade Stadium

1958 Yankee Conference football standings
	Conf.					Overall
Team	W		L		T	W		L		T
No. 12 Connecticut $	4	–	0	–	0	7	–	3	–	0
Maine	3	–	1	–	0	6	–	2	–	0
Rhode Island	2	–	2	–	0	4	–	4	–	0
UMass	1	–	3	–	0	2	–	6	–	0
Vermont	0	–	1	–	0	2	–	4	–	1
New Hampshire	0	–	4	–	0	2	–	6	–	0
$ – Conference champion; Rankings from UPI small college poll

The 1958 Rhode Island Rams football team was an American football team that represented the University of Rhode Island as a member of the Yankee Conference during the 1958 college football season. In its third season under head coach Herb Maack, the team compiled a 4–4 record (2–2 against conference opponents), finished in third place out of six teams in the Yankee Conference, and was outscored by a total of 203 to 152. The team played its home games at Meade Stadium in Kingston, Rhode Island.

== Schedule ==
Date	Opponent	Site	Result	Attendance	Source
September 20	Northeastern*	Meade Stadium; Kingston, RI	L 6–26	3,500	
September 27	at Maine	Alumni Field; Orono, ME	L 8–37	4,000–4,500	
October 4	at New Hampshire	Cowell Stadium; Durham, NH	W 20–13	2,500–5,000	
October 11	Brandeis*	Meade Stadium; Kingtson, RI	W 52–22	2,500	
October 18	UMass	Meade Stadium; Kingston, RI	W 24–8	3,000	
October 25	at Brown*	Brown Stadium; Providence, RI (rivalry)	L 6–47	13,000	
November 1	at Springfield*	Springfield, MA	W 28–14	3,000	
November 15	Connecticut	Meade Stadium; Kingston, RI (rivalry)	L 8–36	4,218–5,500	
*Non-conference game
