= 1958 Bucknell Bison football team =

American college football season

1958 Bucknell Bison football
- Conference: Middle Atlantic Conference
- University Division
- Record: 1–8 (1–5 MAC)
- Head coach: Bob Odell (1st season)
- Captains: Charles Apgar; Lewis Hart
- Home stadium: Memorial Stadium

1958 Middle Atlantic Conference football standings
	Conf.					Overall
Team	W		L		T	W		L		T
University Division
No. 20 Rutgers x	4	–	0	–	0	8	–	1	–	0
Lafayette	5	–	1	–	1	5	–	3	–	1
Gettysburg	3	–	1	–	1	7	–	1	–	1
Lehigh	2	–	1	–	2	3	–	3	–	3
Delaware	2	–	3	–	0	5	–	3	–	0
Bucknell	1	–	5	–	0	1	–	8	–	0
Temple	0	–	5	–	0	0	–	8	–	0
Muhlenberg *	1	–	2	–	0	4	–	4	–	0
Northern College Division
Juniata x	6	–	0	–	0	7	–	0	–	1
Lycoming	4	–	1	–	0	7	–	1	–	0
Lebanon Valley	3	–	1	–	1	4	–	3	–	1
Susquehanna	3	–	2	–	0	3	–	4	–	0
Moravian	3	–	3	–	0	4	–	4	–	0
Wagner	3	–	3	–	0	3	–	5	–	0
Dickinson	3	–	4	–	0	4	–	4	–	0
Albright	2	–	4	–	1	2	–	6	–	1
Wilkes	1	–	7	–	0	1	–	8	–	0
Scranton *	2	–	2	–	0	5	–	3	–	0
Southern College Division
Pennsylvania Military x	7	–	1	–	0	7	–	2	–	0
Johns Hopkins	5	–	1	–	0	5	–	3	–	0
Haverford	4	–	2	–	0	4	–	3	–	0
Western Maryland	1	–	4	–	0	3	–	6	–	0
Swarthmore	1	–	4	–	0	1	–	7	–	0
Drexel	1	–	5	–	0	1	–	7	–	0
Ursinus	0	–	8	–	0	0	–	8	–	0
West Chester *	1	–	0	–	0	9	–	1	–	0
Franklin & Marshall *	3	–	1	–	0	5	–	4	–	0
x – Division champion/co-champions; * – Ineligible for championship due to insufficient conference games; Rankings from AP Poll

The 1958 Bucknell Bison football team was an American football team that represented Bucknell University during the 1958 college football season. Bucknell finished sixth in the Middle Atlantic Conference, University Division.

In its first season under head coach Bob Odell, the team compiled a 1–8 record. Charles Apgar and Lewis Hart were the team captains. In the first year of football competition for the Middle Atlantic Conference, Bucknell was 1–5 against league opponents.

The team played its home games at Memorial Stadium on the university campus in Lewisburg, Pennsylvania.

== Schedule ==
Date	Opponent	Site	Result	Attendance	Source
September 27	vs. Gettysburg	Hershey Stadium; Hershey, PA (Rotary Bowl)	L 0–6	7,000–9,000	
October 4	Carnegie Tech*	Memorial Stadium; Lewisburg, PA	L 13–19	4,416	
October 11	Colgate*	Memorial Stadium; Lewisburg, PA	L 0–7	7,856–7,865	
October 18	at Rutgers	Rutgers Stadium; Piscataway, NJ	L 12–57	20,000	
October 25	Lafayette^{†}	Memorial Stadium; Lewisburg, PA	L 6–34	5,800–6,000	
November 1	Lehigh	Memorial Stadium; Lewisburg, PA	L 14–35	5,200	
November 8	at Temple	Temple Stadium; Philadelphia, PA	W 44–6	4,000	
November 15	at Delaware	Delaware Stadium; Newark, DE	L 8–28	4,464–4,500	
November 22	at No. 11 Buffalo*	Rotary Field; Buffalo, NY	L 0–38	9,500	
*Non-conference game; ^{†}Homecoming; Rankings from UPI Poll released prior to the game
