= 1958 Vermont Catamounts football team =

American college football season

1958 Vermont Catamounts football
- Conference: Yankee Conference
- Record: 2–4–1 (0–1 Yankee)
- Head coach: J. Edward Donnelly (7th season)
- Home stadium: Centennial Field

1958 Yankee Conference football standings
	Conf.					Overall
Team	W		L		T	W		L		T
No. 12 Connecticut $	4	–	0	–	0	7	–	3	–	0
Maine	3	–	1	–	0	6	–	2	–	0
Rhode Island	2	–	2	–	0	4	–	4	–	0
UMass	1	–	3	–	0	2	–	6	–	0
Vermont	0	–	1	–	0	2	–	4	–	1
New Hampshire	0	–	4	–	0	2	–	6	–	0
$ – Conference champion; Rankings from UPI small college poll

The 1958 Vermont Catamounts football team was an American football team that represented the University of Vermont in the Yankee Conference during the 1958 college football season. In their seventh year under head coach J. Edward Donnelly, the team compiled a 2–4–1 record.

== Schedule ==
Date	Opponent	Site	Result	Attendance	Source
September 27	at Coast Guard*	Cadet Memorial Field; New London, CT	T 30–30	3,000	
October 4	Maine	Centennial Field; Burlington, VT	L 0–26	5,000	
October 11	at Hobart*	Boswell Field; Geneva, NY	L 14–18	1,500–3,000	
October 18	at Rochester*	Fauver Stadium; Rochester, NY	L 0–46	5,300	
October 25	at Norwich*	Sabine Field; Northfield, VT	L 12–16	4,000	
November 1	St. Lawrence*^{†}	Centennial Field; Burlington, VT	W 26–7	4,500–5,600	
November 8	Middlebury*	Centennial Field; Burlington, VT	W 20–6	6,500	
*Non-conference game; ^{†}Homecoming
