= Steve Sinko =

American football player and coach (1909–1999)

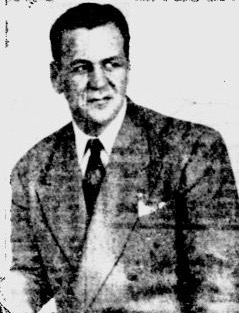
- Sinko pictured in The Pittsburgh Press, 1947

Biographical details
- Born: September 15, 1909; Chisholm, Minnesota, U.S.
- Died: March 1, 1999 (aged 89); Hyannis, Massachusetts, U.S.

Playing career
- 1929–1931: Duquesne
- 1934–1936: Boston Redskins
- 1937–1938: Los Angeles Bulldogs
- Positions: Guard, tackle

Coaching career (HC unless noted)
- 1939–1942: Duquesne (assistant)
- 1944: Iowa Pre-Flight (assistant)
- 1946: Duquesne
- 1947–1948: Boston University (assistant)
- 1949–1950: Indiana (assistant)
- 1951–1957: Boston University (line)
- 1957–1963: Boston University

Head coaching record
- Overall: 23–36–3

Stephen Patrick Sinko (September 14, 1909 – March 1, 1999) was an American football player and coach. He played professionally as a guard and tackle in the National Football League (NFL) for the Boston Redskins from 1934 to 1936 and the Los Angeles Bulldogs from 1937 to 1938. Sinko served as the head football coach at Boston University from 1957 to 1963, compiling a record of 23–36–3.

== Background ==
Sinko was born and raised in Chisholm, Minnesota, where he graduated from the local high school. He attended Duquesne University, where he played college football for the Duquesne Dukes.

== Professional career ==
Following college, Sinko played professionally for the Boston Redskins for three seasons, from 1934 to 1936, before moving to the Los Angeles Bulldogs for two seasons, 1937 to 1938. In 1939, he took an assistant coaching position under Aldo Donelli at Duquesne University. In 1941, the two served as head coach and line coach of the NFL's Pittsburgh Steelers.

During World War II, Sinko served as an officer in the United States Navy. During his service, he was a coach for the Iowa Pre-Flight Seahawks football team. In early 1946, Sinko was hired as an assistant coach for the Miami Seahawks of the All-America Football Conference AAFC). In June of that year, he was signed as head football coach at Duquesne University, only to serve in that capacity until December 1946, when he quit to once again become an assistant to Aldo Donelli, this time at Boston University.

In 1949, Sinko was named as assistant to Clyde B. Smith at Indiana University. Sinko return to Boston University in 1951, once again assisting Donelli before succeeding him as head football coach in 1957. Sinko served as the head football coach at Boston University from 1957 to 1963, compiling a record of 23–36–3. He was succeeded as head coach by Warren Schmakel.

== Honors and death ==
Sinko was inducted into the Duquesne Dukes Hall of Fame in 1988. He died on March 1, 1999, at Cape Cod Hospital in Hyannis, Massachusetts.

== Head coaching record ==
Year	Team	Overall	Conference	Standing	Bowl/playoffs
Boston University Terriers (NCAA University Division independent) (1957–1963)
1957	Boston University	5–3			
1958	Boston University	4–5			
1959	Boston University	4–5			
1960	Boston University	3–5–2			
1961	Boston University	4–5			
1962	Boston University	2–7			
1963	Boston University	1–6–1			
Boston University:		23–36–3			
Total:		23–36–3			
