= 1958 New Hampshire Wildcats football team =

American college football season

1958 New Hampshire Wildcats football
- Conference: Yankee Conference
- Record: 2–6 (0–4 Yankee)
- Head coach: Chief Boston (10th season)
- Home stadium: Cowell Stadium

1958 Yankee Conference football standings
	Conf.					Overall
Team	W		L		T	W		L		T
No. 12 Connecticut $	4	–	0	–	0	7	–	3	–	0
Maine	3	–	1	–	0	6	–	2	–	0
Rhode Island	2	–	2	–	0	4	–	4	–	0
UMass	1	–	3	–	0	2	–	6	–	0
Vermont	0	–	1	–	0	2	–	4	–	1
New Hampshire	0	–	4	–	0	2	–	6	–	0
$ – Conference champion; Rankings from UPI small college poll

The 1958 New Hampshire Wildcats football team was an American football team that represented the University of New Hampshire as a member of the Yankee Conference during the 1958 college football season. In its tenth year under head coach Chief Boston, the team compiled a 2–6 record (0–4 against conference opponents) and finished last out of six teams in the Yankee Conference.

== Schedule ==
Date	Opponent	Site	Result	Attendance	Source
September 27	at Northeastern	Kent Strett Field; Boston, MA	L 0–12		
October 4	Rhode Island	Cowell Stadium; Durham, NH	L 13–20	2,500–5,000	
October 11	at Maine	Alumni Field; Orono, ME (Battle for the Brice–Cowell Musket)	L 0–14	5,000	
October 18	Delaware^{†}	Cowell Stadium; Durham, NH	L 14–36	6,000–6,500	
October 25	at Brandeis*	Waltham, MA	W 18–8		
November 1	Connecticut	Cowell Stadium; Durham, NH	L 0–34	6,000	
November 8	Springfield*	Cowell Stadium; Durham, NH	W 43–20		
November 15	at UMass	Alumni Field; Amherst, MA (rivalry)	L 24–25		
*Non-conference game; ^{†}Homecoming
