= 1958 Cornell Big Red football team =

American college football season

1958 Cornell Big Red football
- Conference: Ivy League
- Record: 6–3 (5–2 Ivy)
- Head coach: George K. James (12th season)
- Captain: Bob Hazzard
- Home stadium: Schoellkopf Field

1958 Ivy League football standings
	Conf.					Overall
Team	W		L		T	W		L		T
Dartmouth $	6	–	1	–	0	7	–	2	–	0
Cornell	5	–	2	–	0	6	–	3	–	0
Princeton	5	–	2	–	0	6	–	3	–	0
Brown	4	–	3	–	0	6	–	3	–	0
Penn	4	–	3	–	0	4	–	5	–	0
Harvard	3	–	4	–	0	4	–	5	–	0
Columbia	1	–	6	–	0	1	–	8	–	0
Yale	0	–	7	–	0	2	–	7	–	0
$ – Conference champion

The 1958 Cornell Big Red football team was an American football team that represented Cornell University as a member of the Ivy League during the 1958 college football season.

In its 12th season under head coach George K. James, the team compiled a 6–3 record and outscored opponents 147 to 135. Bob Hazzard was the team captain.

Cornell's 5–2 conference record tied for second place in the Ivy League. The Big Red outscored Ivy opponents 134 to 80.

Cornell played its home games at Schoellkopf Field in Ithaca, New York.

== Schedule ==
Date	Opponent	Site	Result	Attendance	Source
September 27	Colgate*	Schoellkopf Field; Ithaca, NY (rivalry)	W 13–0	12,000	
October 4	Harvard^{†}	Schoellkopf Field; Ithaca, NY	W 21–14	15,000	
October 11	at Syracuse*	Archbold Stadium; Syracuse, NY	L 0–55	24,000	
October 18	at Yale	Yale Bowl; New Haven, CT	W 12–7	28,816	
October 25	Princeton	Schoellkopf Field; Ithaca, NY	W 34–8	23,000	
November 1	at Columbia	Baker Field; New York, NY (rivalry)	W 25–0	17,500	
November 8	at Brown	Brown Stadium; Providence, RI	L 8–12	15,500	
November 15	Dartmouth	Schoellkopf Field; Ithaca, NY (rivalry)	L 15–32	16,000	
November 27	at Penn	Franklin Field; Philadelphia, PA (rivalry)	W 19–7	19,116	
*Non-conference game; ^{†}Homecoming
