= 1958 Buffalo Bulls football team =

American college football season

1958 Buffalo Bulls football

Lambert Cup winner
- Conference: Independent
- Record: 8–1
- Head coach: Dick Offenhamer (4th season)
- Captains: Nick Bottini; Lou Reale
- Home stadium: Civic Stadium, Rotary Field

1958 Eastern non-major college football independents records
	Conf.			Overall
Team	W	L	T	W		L		T
Rochester		–		8	–	0	–	0
Hamilton		–		6	–	0	–	1
No. 10 Buffalo		–		8	–	1	–	0
Southern Connecticut State		–		7	–	2	–	0
Carnegie Tech		–		6	–	2	–	0
Northeastern		–		6	–	2	–	0
Hofstra		–		6	–	4	–	0
Rankings from UPI small college poll

The 1958 Buffalo Bulls football team represented the University at Buffalo as an independent the 1958 college football season. The Bulls' offense scored 236 points while the defense allowed 101 points. The team won the Lambert Cup, emblematic of supremacy in Eastern U.S. small-college football. The Bulls were invited to play in the Tangerine Bowl against Florida State. The team voted to turn down the bowl invitation after learning that they would be allowed to participate only if the team's two black players, back-up defensive end Mike Wilson and starting halfback Willie Evans, did not play in the game. The 1958 Bulls team was profiled on ESPN's Outside the Lines in 2008. Buffalo would not be invited to a bowl or be bowl-eligible for another 50 years.

== Schedule ==
Date	Opponent	Rank	Site	Result	Attendance	Source
September 27	at Harvard		Harvard Stadium; Boston, MA	W 6–3	6,000	
October 4	at Cortland		Cortland, NY	W 7–6	3,500	
October 11	at Western Reserve		Cleveland, OH	W 19–6	5,500	
October 18	Baldwin–Wallace^{†}		Rotary Field; Buffalo, NY	L 0–26	10,250	
October 25	Columbia		Civic Stadium; Buffalo, NY	W 34–14	13,074	
November 1	Temple	No. T–20	Civic Stadium; Buffalo, NY	W 54–6	9,500	
November 8	at Wayne State (MI)	No. 15	Tartar Field; Detroit, MI	W 44–14	2,000	
November 15	at Lehigh	No. 16	Taylor Stadium; Bethlehem, PA	W 34–26	5,200	
November 22	Bucknell	No. 11	Rotary Field; Buffalo, NY	W 38–0	9,500	
^{†}Homecoming; Rankings from UPI Poll released prior to the game

== After the season ==
=== NFL draft ===
The following Bull was selected in the 1959 NFL draft following the season.

Round	Pick	Player	Position	NFL club
25	299	Lou Reale	Center	New York Giants
