= 1958 Connecticut Huskies football team =

American college football season

1958 Connecticut Huskies football

Yankee Conference champion
- Conference: Yankee Conference
- Record: 7–3 (4–0 Yankee)
- Head coach: Bob Ingalls (7th season)
- Home stadium: Memorial Stadium

1958 Yankee Conference football standings
	Conf.					Overall
Team	W		L		T	W		L		T
No. 12 Connecticut $	4	–	0	–	0	7	–	3	–	0
Maine	3	–	1	–	0	6	–	2	–	0
Rhode Island	2	–	2	–	0	4	–	4	–	0
UMass	1	–	3	–	0	2	–	6	–	0
Vermont	0	–	1	–	0	2	–	4	–	1
New Hampshire	0	–	4	–	0	2	–	6	–	0
$ – Conference champion; Rankings from UPI small college poll

The 1958 Connecticut Huskies football team represented the University of Connecticut in the 1958 college football season. The Huskies were led by seventh-year head coach Bob Ingalls, and completed the season with a record of 7–3.

== Schedule ==
Date	Opponent	Site	Result	Attendance	Source
September 20	Springfield*	Memorial Stadium; Storrs, CT	W 41–14	6,682	
September 27	at Yale*	Yale Bowl; New Haven, CT	L 6–8	22,158	
October 4	American International*	Memorial Stadium; Storrs, CT	W 55–6	5,506	
October 11	at UMass	Alumni Field; Amherst, MA (rivalry)	W 28–14	6,500	
October 18	Maine	Memorial Stadium; Storrs, CT	W 21–6	13,359	
October 25	at Delaware*	Delaware Stadium; Newark, DE	L 0–28	5,184–5,189	
November 1	at New Hampshire	Cowell Stadium; Durham, NH	W 34–0	6,000	
November 8	Northeastern*	Memorial Stadium; Storrs, CT	W 38–14	9,154	
November 15	at Rhode Island	Meade Stadium; Kingston, RI (rivalry)	W 36–8	4,218–5,000	
November 22	Boston University*	Memorial Stadium; Storrs, CT	L 22–36	10,139	
*Non-conference game
