= 1958 Rutgers Scarlet Knights football team =

American college football season

1958 Rutgers Scarlet Knights football

MAC University Division champion Middle Three champion
- Conference: Middle Atlantic Conference, Middle Three Conference
- University Division

Ranking
- AP: No. 20
- Record: 8–1 (4–0 MAC, 2–0 Middle Three)
- Head coach: John Stiegman (3rd season)
- Home stadium: Rutgers Stadium

1958 Middle Atlantic Conference football standings
	Conf.					Overall
Team	W		L		T	W		L		T
University Division
No. 20 Rutgers x	4	–	0	–	0	8	–	1	–	0
Lafayette	5	–	1	–	1	5	–	3	–	1
Gettysburg	3	–	1	–	1	7	–	1	–	1
Lehigh	2	–	1	–	2	3	–	3	–	3
Delaware	2	–	3	–	0	5	–	3	–	0
Bucknell	1	–	5	–	0	1	–	8	–	0
Temple	0	–	5	–	0	0	–	8	–	0
Muhlenberg *	1	–	2	–	0	4	–	4	–	0
Northern College Division
Juniata x	6	–	0	–	0	7	–	0	–	1
Lycoming	4	–	1	–	0	7	–	1	–	0
Lebanon Valley	3	–	1	–	1	4	–	3	–	1
Susquehanna	3	–	2	–	0	3	–	4	–	0
Moravian	3	–	3	–	0	4	–	4	–	0
Wagner	3	–	3	–	0	3	–	5	–	0
Dickinson	3	–	4	–	0	4	–	4	–	0
Albright	2	–	4	–	1	2	–	6	–	1
Wilkes	1	–	7	–	0	1	–	8	–	0
Scranton *	2	–	2	–	0	5	–	3	–	0
Southern College Division
Pennsylvania Military x	7	–	1	–	0	7	–	2	–	0
Johns Hopkins	5	–	1	–	0	5	–	3	–	0
Haverford	4	–	2	–	0	4	–	3	–	0
Western Maryland	1	–	4	–	0	3	–	6	–	0
Swarthmore	1	–	4	–	0	1	–	7	–	0
Drexel	1	–	5	–	0	1	–	7	–	0
Ursinus	0	–	8	–	0	0	–	8	–	0
West Chester *	1	–	0	–	0	9	–	1	–	0
Franklin & Marshall *	3	–	1	–	0	5	–	4	–	0
x – Division champion/co-champions; * – Ineligible for championship due to insufficient conference games; Rankings from AP Poll

The 1958 Rutgers Scarlet Knights football team was an American football team that represented Rutgers University as a member of the Middle Atlantic Conference (MAC) during the 1958 college football season. In their third season under head coach John Stiegman, the Scarlet Knights compiled an 8–1 record, outscored their opponents 301 to 77, won the MAC championship, and were ranked No. 20 in the final AP Poll. Rutgers narrowly failed to achieve a perfect season, missing two attempts for a two-point conversion in a 13–12 loss to the Quantico Marines.

Fullback Bill Austin led the team with 747 rushing yards, set a new Rutgers single-game record with 189 yards against Bucknell and scored five touchdowns and two extra points against Columbia. At the end of the season, he was selected by the Associated Press (AP) as a first-team back on the 1958 All-America college football team.

Other statistical leaders included Bruce Webster with 513 passing yards and end Bob Simms with 468 receiving yards. Guard Larry Muchiatti received third-team honors from the AP on the 1958 All-Eastern football team.

In the first year of football competition for the MAC, Rutgers was undefeated against University Division opponents. The Scarlet Knights also went 2–0 against the Middle Three, beating both Lafayette and Lehigh.

== Schedule ==
Date	Opponent	Site	Result	Attendance	Source
September 27	at Princeton*	Palmer Stadium; Princeton, NJ (rivalry)	W 28–0	26,000	
October 4	at Colgate*	Colgate Athletic Field; Hamilton, NY	W 21–7	6,500	
October 11	Richmond*	Rutgers Stadium; Piscataway, NJ	W 23–12	10,000	
October 18	Bucknell^{†}	Rutgers Stadium; Piscataway, NJ	W 57–12	20,000	
October 25	at Lehigh	Taylor Stadium; Behtlehem, PA	W 44–13	8,500	
November 1	at Delaware	Delaware Stadium; Newark, DE	W 37–20	8,600	
November 8	Lafayette	Rutgers Stadium; Piscataway, NJ	W 18–0	21,000	
November 15	Quantico Marines*	Rutgers Stadium; Piscataway, NJ	L 12–13	10,000	
November 22	Columbia*	Rutgers Stadium; Piscataway, NJ	W 43–2	20,000	
*Non-conference game; ^{†}Homecoming
