= 1958 Penn State Nittany Lions football team =

American college football season

1958 Penn State Nittany Lions football
- Conference: Independent
- Record: 6–3–1
- Head coach: Rip Engle (9th season)
- Captain: Steve Garban
- Home stadium: New Beaver Field

1958 Eastern major college football independents records
	Conf.			Overall
Team	W	L	T	W		L		T
No. 3 Army		–		8	–	0	–	1
No. 9 Syracuse		–		8	–	2	–	0
Boston College		–		7	–	3	–	0
Holy Cross		–		6	–	3	–	0
Penn State		–		6	–	3	–	1
Villanova		–		6	–	4	–	0
Pittsburgh		–		5	–	4	–	1
Boston University		–		4	–	5	–	0
Colgate		–		1	–	8	–	0
Rankings from AP poll

The 1958 Penn State Nittany Lions football team represented the Pennsylvania State University as an independent during the 1958 college football season. The team was coached by Rip Engle and played its home games in New Beaver Field in University Park, Pennsylvania.

== Schedule ==
Date	Opponent	Site	Result	Attendance	Source
September 20	at Nebraska	Memorial Stadium; Lincoln, NE	L 7–14	30,000	
September 27	at Penn	Franklin Field; Philadelphia, PA	W 43–0	19,549	
October 4	at No. 5 Army	Michie Stadium; West Point, NY	L 0–26	27,250	
October 11	Marquette^{†}	New Beaver Field; University Park, PA	W 40–8	22,000	
October 18	at Boston University	Nickerson Field; Boston, MA	W 34–0	11,000	
October 25	Syracuse	New Beaver Field; University Park, PA (rivalry)	L 6–14	27,000	
November 1	Furman	New Beaver Field; University Park, PA	W 36–0	23,000	
November 8	at West Virginia	Mountaineer Field; Morgantown, WV (rivalry)	T 14–14	26,000	
November 15	Holy Cross	New Beaver Field; University Park, PA	W 32–0	18,800–20,000	
November 27	at No. 19 Pittsburgh	Pitt Stadium; Pittsburgh, PA (rivalry)	W 25–21	39,479	
^{†}Homecoming; Rankings from AP Poll released prior to the game; Source:
