= Warren Giese =

American football player and coach, state legislator (1924–2013)

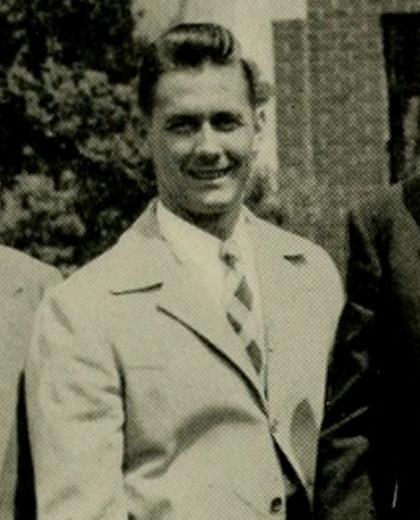
- Giese as Maryland assistant in 1949

Member of the South Carolina Senate from the 22nd district
- In office 1985–2003
- Preceded by: unknown
- Succeeded by: Joel Lourie

Personal details
- Born: July 14, 1924 Milwaukee, Wisconsin, U.S.
- Died: September 12, 2013 (aged 89) Columbia, South Carolina, U.S.
- Party: Republican
- Education: University of Oklahoma
- Coaching career

Playing career
- 1942: Milwaukee State Teachers
- 1943: Central Michigan
- 1944: Miami NTC
- 1945: Jacksonville NAS
- 1946: Oklahoma
- 1947: Central Michigan
- Position: End

Coaching career (HC unless noted)
- 1949–1955: Maryland (ends)
- 1956–1960: South Carolina

Administrative career (AD unless noted)
- 1956–1960: South Carolina

Head coaching record
- Overall: 28–21–1

Warren Kenneth Giese (July 14, 1924 – September 12, 2013) was an American state legislator in South Carolina and a college football coach. He served as the head football coach for the South Carolina Gamecocks for five years at the University of South Carolina. He later served in the South Carolina State Senate.

At South Carolina, Giese employed a conservative, run-first game strategy, but he enthusiastically adopted the two-point conversion when it was made legal in 1958. That year, he also correctly predicted the rise of special teams after the NCAA relaxed its player substitution rules.

== Early life ==
Giese was born in Milwaukee, Wisconsin, where he attended Rufus King High School. He attended and played football at the Milwaukee State Teachers College for one year before enlisting in the United States Navy through the V-12 pilot training program at Central Michigan University. He played football there as well in 1943, and in the Navy, he also played at stations in Miami and Jacksonville, Florida.

Giese was also an All-American jumper for the Central Michigan Chippewas track and field team, placing 6th in the long jump at the 1944 NCAA track and field championships.

After World War II, Giese resumed college at the University of Oklahoma, where he played college football as an end under head coach Jim Tatum in 1946. That season, he was named a first-team All-Big Six Conference player. Giese graduated from Oklahoma in 1947. That year, he returned to Central Michigan to play football for his final year of college eligibility.

== Coaching career ==
Giese began his coaching career at the Sacred Heart Academy High School in Mount Pleasant, Michigan, where he coached for one season and compiled a 3–4 record. From 1949 to 1955, Giese served as the ends coach at Maryland. During that time, under Jim Tatum, Giese's former mentor at Oklahoma, Maryland was awarded the consensus national championship in 1953 and has been retroactively awarded the 1951 national championship by several selectors. In March 1951, Giese declined the head coaching position at Central Michigan University, for which he had already been approved by the school administration, after Maryland offered him a pay raise. Giese co-authored a book with Tatum entitled Coaching Football and the Split-T.

In 1955, University of South Carolina athletic director and head football coach, Rex Enright, compiled a 3–6 record and his health was in decline. As a result, he resigned as football coach and hired Giese as his own replacement. At the time, Giese was the youngest head football coach in the nation. He remained as South Carolina head coach for five years and compiled a 28–21–1 record.

As head coach, Giese employed a conservative strategy heavily focused on the ground attack and rarely employed passing. He also relied on long drives to maximize time of possession and said "The other team can't score if it doesn't have the football." When Giese took over in 1956, at least 51 South Carolina players were being paid, in violation of National Collegiate Athletic Association (NCAA) rules. The Gamecocks' star running back, Alex Hawkins, admitted, "Every school that recruited me had some kind of financial offer." Giese put an immediate end to the payouts and told the players, "Anybody that doesn't like it, submit three teams that you'd like me to recommend you to." Hawkins requested a recommendation for Kentucky among others, but says, "It never dawned on me he wouldn't call any of them."

In his first season, 1956, Giese coached the Gamecocks to a 7–3 record. In the second game, South Carolina defeated 16th-ranked Duke led by quarterback Sonny Jurgensen, 7–0. It was South Carolina's first win over Duke since 1930 and propelled the Gamecocks to a number-17 ranking. South Carolina set the Atlantic Coast Conference (ACC) record for passing defense, allowing just 476 passing yards (47.6 per game), which still stands to date. In 1957, South Carolina upset the then 20th-ranked Texas team that continued onto the Sugar Bowl, 27–21. The Gamecocks finished with a 5–5 record. In 1958, Giese's team recorded the only win over arch-rival Clemson during his tenure, 26–6. Hawkins was named the ACC Player of the Year. That season, the NCAA implemented the two-point conversion rule, and Giese enthusiastically adopted it as part of his game strategy. He calculated that two-point conversions were successful 40% of the time, while point-after-touchdown kicks succeeded 65% of the time. In 1959, South Carolina recorded 13 two-point conversions, setting a school record that still stands to date.

That season, the NCAA loosened its rules regarding player substitutions, and Giese correctly predicted the future rise of a "third platoon", distinct from the offensive and defensive units of two-platoon football. Today the third platoon is known as the special teams. In 1959, South Carolina was the only team to beat Georgia. The Gamecocks climbed to a number 11 ranking in mid-season and finished with a 6–4 record. In 1960, Giese's team finished with a 3–6–1 record, and he was replaced by former assistant Marvin Bass. After his relief as head coach, Giese remained the South Carolina director of athletics for an additional year. In 1962, he became a full-time professor and chairman of the Department of Physical Education.

== Political career ==
Giese was elected as a Republican to the South Carolina State Senate in 1985. He retired in 2004 as the second oldest serving South Carolina senator.

== Personal life ==
One of his sons, W. Barney Giese, who attended the University of South Carolina as an undergraduate and member of the college's swim team and attended the university's law school, served as the solicitor (district attorney) for Richland County from 1995 to 2011. Barney Giese unsuccessfully ran for election to his retired father's vacated Senate seat. His other son, Keith Giese, served as an assistant solicitor in Lexington County, South Carolina, and currently works as a criminal defense lawyer in Columbia, South Carolina. Giese died on September 12, 2013, in Columbia.

== Head coaching record ==
Year	Team	Overall	Conference	Standing	Bowl/playoffs	Coaches^{#}	AP^{°}
South Carolina Gamecocks (Atlantic Coast Conference) (1956–1960)
1956	South Carolina	7–3	5–2	3rd			
1957	South Carolina	5–5	2–5	7th			
1958	South Carolina	7–3	5–2	2nd			15
1959	South Carolina	6–4	4–3	5th			
1960	South Carolina	3–6–1	3–3–1	5th			
South Carolina:		28–21–1	19–15–1				
Total:		28–21–1					
^{#}Rankings from final Coaches Poll.; ^{°}Rankings from final AP Poll.

South Carolina Senate
Preceded by Constituency established	Member of the South Carolina Senate from the 22nd district 1985–2005	Succeeded by Joel Lourie
