= 1958 Maryland Terrapins football team =

American college football season

1958 Maryland Terrapins football
- Conference: Atlantic Coast Conference
- Record: 4–6 (3–3 ACC)
- Head coach: Tommy Mont (3rd season)
- Offensive scheme: Split-T
- Home stadium: Byrd Stadium

1958 Atlantic Coast Conference football standings
	Conf.					Overall
Team	W		L		T	W		L		T
No. 12 Clemson $	5	–	1	–	0	8	–	3	–	0
No. 15 South Carolina	5	–	2	–	0	7	–	3	–	0
Duke	3	–	2	–	0	5	–	5	–	0
North Carolina	4	–	3	–	0	6	–	4	–	0
Maryland	3	–	3	–	0	4	–	6	–	0
Wake Forest	2	–	4	–	0	3	–	7	–	0
NC State	2	–	5	–	0	2	–	7	–	1
Virginia	1	–	5	–	0	1	–	9	–	0
$ – Conference champion; Rankings from AP poll

The 1958 Maryland Terrapins football team represented the University of Maryland in the 1958 college football season as a member of the Atlantic Coast Conference. They were led by third-year head coach Tommy Mont, who guided Maryland to a 4–6 record. He resigned at the end of the season, and was replaced by Tom Nugent.

== Schedule ==
Date	Opponent	Site	Result	Attendance	Source
September 20	at Wake Forest	Bowman Gray Stadium; Winston-Salem, NC	L 34–0	8,000	
September 27	at NC State	Riddick Stadium; Raleigh, NC	W 21–6	11,000	
October 4	No. 10 Clemson	Byrd Stadium; College Park, MD	L 8–0	24,000	
October 11	Texas A&M*	Byrd Stadium; College Park, MD	L 14–10	23,000	
October 18	at North Carolina	Kenan Memorial Stadium; Chapel Hill, NC	L 27–0	25,000	
October 25	at No. 5 Auburn*	Cliff Hare Stadium; Auburn, AL	L 20–7	28,000	
November 1	South Carolina	Byrd Stadium; College Park, MD	W 10–6	17,000	
November 8	vs. Navy*	Memorial Stadium; Baltimore, MD (Crab Bowl Classic)	L 40–14	30,035	
November 14	at Miami (FL)*	Burdine Stadium; Miami, FL	W 26–14	26,747	
November 22	at Virginia	Scott Stadium; Charlottesville, VA (rivalry)	W 44–6	18,000	
*Non-conference game; Rankings from AP Poll released prior to the game

== Before the season ==
The Baltimore Sun predicted 1958 would prove to be Mont's first winning season because of increased depth, but also noted the difficulty of the schedule, which included six teams ranked in the Associated Press preseason poll. Mont rated Clemson and Auburn as the toughest opponents on the schedule.

=== Personnel ===
The 1958 team consisted of the following letterwinners:

- Al Beardsley
- Ed Becker
- Joe Behrmann
- Dale Betty
- Pete Boinis
- Rod Breedlove
- Everett Cloud
- Bob Cole
- Fred Cole
- Leroy Dietrich
- Tom Flor
- Dwayne Fletcher
- John Forbes
- Bob Gallagher
- Joe Gardi
- Tom Gunderman
- Jim Hatter
- Jim Joyce
- Fred Kern
- Ted Kershner
- Ron Laneve
- Bob Layman
- Bill Lazaro
- Dickie Lewis
- Ed Nickla
- Bob Rusevlyan
- Dick Scarbath
- Victor Schwartz
- Kurt Schwarz
- Ben Scotti
- Tony Scotti
- Vincent Scott
- Ron Shaffer
- Gene Verardi

The coaching staff consisted of:

- Tommy Mont, head coach
- Gene Alderton
- William Dovell
- Ed Fullerton
- Jack Hennemier
- Johnny Idzik
- Fred Layman
- Roy Lester

== Season ==
In the season opener, Wake Forest snapped a 12-game losing streak and routed Maryland, 34–0, which "about eliminated Maryland from consideration as a possible Atlantic Coast Conference champion."

Maryland rebounded to defeat the defending ACC champions, NC State, in Raleigh, 21–6. In the first quarter, a 73-yard Terrapins drive culminated with halfback John Forbes scoring on a four-yard rush. In the third quarter, quarterback Dickie Lewis connected with Forbes, who ran without his left shoe, into the end zone for a 71-yard touchdown. In the fourth quarter, Forbes recovered an NC State fumble on the opposing 25-yard line, which set up the third Maryland score. In the final period, Wolfpack back Randy Harrell intercepted a Maryland pass on the Terrapins' 41-yard line, and on the ensuing possession, caught a 15-yard pass from Gerald Mancini for State's lone score.

The following week, tenth-ranked Clemson beat Maryland, 8–0. The Terrapins' first-team defense stood fast on their own four-yard line, but the second team was substituted into the game and forced to punt. On the first play of Clemson's subsequent possession, quarterback Harvey White threw a 30-yard pass to end Wyatt Cox, who then beat two Maryland pursuers and ran twenty yards for a touchdown.

Texas A&M, running its single-wing offense, defeated Maryland, 14–10. Early in an 88-yard Texas A&M drive, Maryland's Tony Scotti recovered a fumble on the Aggie 30-yard line, but it was overturned on an offsides call. Quarterback Charlie Milstead took over, and capped the drive with a three-yard keeper into the end zone. In the fourth quarter, Maryland repeatedly entered Texas A&M territory, only to give up a fumble and an interception.

North Carolina's stout defense "bottled up" Maryland, and its offense scored on several sustained drives. The Tar Heels scored on their first possession with a 60-yard drive. In the second quarter, Tar Heels quarterback Jack Cummings led an 80-yard scoring drive. Later in the period, Carolina end Al Goldstein picked off a pass by Bob Rusevlyan and ran 46-yards for a touchdown. In the final quarter, Carolina scored again on a 70-yard drive for a final result of 27–0.

Fifth-ranked Auburn handed Maryland its fourth straight loss, 20–7, and extended its own undefeated streak to nineteen games. Auburn scored first to take a 6–0 lead, but Maryland quarterback Rusevlyan connected with end Ben Scotti for a 68-yard touchdown pass in the third quarter. With the extra point, Maryland went up 7–6, which was the first time Auburn trailed an opponent since the previous season's game against Mississippi State. After the ensuing kickoff, Auburn scored in the span of two plays, but failed on the point after kick. At the end of the third period, a pass from Rusevlyan was intercepted by back Tommy Lorino, which put Auburn in position for their final score.

Maryland snapped its losing streak with an upset against South Carolina, 10–6. The following week, however, Navy routed Maryland, 40–14. Fullback Joe Matalavage compiled 102–rushing yards more than the entire Maryland team.

Maryland beat an injury-riddled Miami, 26–14. The Miami News wrote, "This MD—home of University of Maryland—produced some mad, unlicensed surgeons, some butchers in the middle of the line, notably guards Rod Breedlove and Tom Gunderman, who chopped up the Hurricanes." Maryland quarterback Dick Scarbath led the team and back John Forbes scored three touchdowns.

In the finale, Maryland routed Virginia, 44–6. The Terrapins set a conference record with 350 passing yards, and tied the records for pass attempts with 40, and completions with 18. Guard Rod Breedlove also intercepted two Virginia passes, both of which set up Maryland touchdowns.

== After the season ==
Mont resigned at the conclusion of the 4–6 season. St. Petersburg Times wrote the resignation "had all the earmarks of having been forced", coming just a day after the Board of Regents concluded its discussions on whether to extend his expiring contract. He said, "I'll never apologize for the performance of my Maryland teams." Mont compiled an 11–18–1 record during his tenure.

NC State head coach Earle Edwards, Oklahoma line coach Gomer Jones, and Maryland assistant Jack Hennemier were considered to be candidates for the vacant head coaching position. In January 1959, Maryland hired Florida State head coach Tom Nugent, an innovator of the I formation.
