= Atlantic Coast Conference football individual awards =

The Atlantic Coast Conference honors players and coaches upon the conclusion of each college football season with the following individual honors as voted on by the Atlantic Coast Sports Media Association.

== Coach of the Year ==
- 1953: Jim Tatum, Maryland
- 1954: William D. Murray, Duke
- 1955: Jim Tatum, Maryland
- 1956: Paul Amen, Wake Forest
- 1957: Earle Edwards, NC State
- 1958: Frank Howard, Clemson
- 1959: Paul Amen, Wake Forest
- 1960: William D. Murray, Duke
- 1961: Bill Elias, Virginia
- 1962: William D. Murray, Duke
- 1963: Jim Hickey, North Carolina; Earle Edwards, NC State
- 1964: Bill Tate, Wake Forest
- 1965: Earle Edwards, NC State
- 1966: Frank Howard, Clemson
- 1967: Earle Edwards, NC State
- 1968: George Blackburn, Virginia
- 1969: Paul Dietzel, South Carolina
- 1970: Cal Stoll, Wake Forest
- 1971: Bill Dooley, North Carolina
- 1972: Lou Holtz, NC State
- 1973: Jerry Claiborne, Maryland
- 1974: Red Parker, Clemson
- 1975: Jerry Claiborne, Maryland
- 1976: Jerry Claiborne, Maryland
- 1977: Charley Pell, Clemson
- 1978: Charley Pell, Clemson
- 1979: John Mackovic, Wake Forest
- 1980: Dick Crum, North Carolina
- 1981: Danny Ford, Clemson
- 1982: Bobby Ross, Maryland
- 1983: George Welsh, Virginia
- 1984: George Welsh, Virginia
- 1985: Bill Curry, Georgia Tech
- 1986: Dick Sheridan, NC State
- 1987: Bill Dooley, Wake Forest
- 1988: Steve Spurrier, Duke
- 1989: Steve Spurrier, Duke
- 1990: Bobby Ross, Georgia Tech
- 1991: George Welsh, Virginia
- 1992: Bill Dooley, Wake Forest
- 1993: Bobby Bowden, Florida State
- 1994: Fred Goldsmith, Duke
- 1995: George Welsh, Virginia
- 1996: Mack Brown, North Carolina
- 1997: Bobby Bowden, Florida State
- 1998: George O'Leary, Georgia Tech
- 1999: Tommy Bowden, Clemson
- 2000: George O'Leary, Georgia Tech
- 2001: Ralph Friedgen, Maryland
- 2002: Al Groh, Virginia
- 2003: Tommy Bowden, Clemson
- 2004: Frank Beamer, Virginia Tech
- 2005: Frank Beamer, Virginia Tech
- 2006: Jim Grobe, Wake Forest
- 2007: Al Groh, Virginia
- 2008: Paul Johnson, Georgia Tech
- 2009: Paul Johnson, Georgia Tech
- 2010: Ralph Friedgen, Maryland
- 2011: Mike London, Virginia
- 2012: David Cutcliffe, Duke
- 2013: David Cutcliffe, Duke
- 2014: Paul Johnson, Georgia Tech
- 2015: Dabo Swinney, Clemson
- 2016: Justin Fuente, Virginia Tech
- 2017: Mark Richt, Miami
- 2018: Dabo Swinney, Clemson
- 2019: Scott Satterfield, Louisville
- 2020: Brian Kelly, Notre Dame
- 2021: Dave Clawson, Wake Forest
- 2022: Mike Elko, Duke
- 2023: Mike Norvell, Florida State
- 2024: Rhett Lashlee, SMU
- 2025: Tony Elliott, Virginia

== Player of the Year ==
Season	Winner	Pos.	Team
1953	Bernie Faloney	QB	Maryland
1954	Jerry Barger	QB	Duke
1955	Bob Pellegrini	C	Maryland
1956	Billy Ray Barnes	HB	Wake Forest
1957	Dick Christy	HB	NC State
1958	Alex Hawkins	HB	South Carolina
1959	Mike McGee	G	Duke
1960	Roman Gabriel	QB	NC State
1961	Roman Gabriel (2)	QB	NC State
1962	Billy Gambrell	HB	South Carolina
1963	Jay Wilkinson	HB	Duke
1964	Brian Piccolo	HB	Wake Forest
1965	Danny Talbott	QB	North Carolina
1966	Bob Davis	QB	Virginia
1967	Buddy Gore	HB	Clemson
1968	Frank Quayle	RB	Virginia
1969	Don McCauley	RB	North Carolina
1970	Don McCauley (2)	RB	North Carolina
1971	Ernie Jackson	CB	Duke
1972	Steve Jones	RB	Duke
1973	Willie Burden	RB	NC State
1974	Randy White	DT	Maryland
1975	Mike Voight	RB	North Carolina
1976	Mike Voight (2)	RB	North Carolina
1977	Steve Fuller	QB	Clemson
1978	Steve Fuller (2)	QB	Clemson
1979	Jay Venuto	QB	Wake Forest
1980	Lawrence Taylor	LB	North Carolina
1981	Jeff Davis	LB	Clemson
1982	Chris Castor	WR	Duke
1983	Ben Bennett	QB	Duke
1984	William Perry	DT	Clemson
1985	Barry Word	RB	Virginia
1986	Erik Kramer	QB	NC State
1987	Michael Dean Perry	DT	Clemson
1988	Anthony Dilweg	QB	Duke
1989	Clarkston Hines	WR	Duke
1990	Shawn Moore	QB	Virginia
1991	Matt Blundin	QB	Virginia
1992	Charlie Ward	QB	Florida State
1993	Charlie Ward (2)	QB	Florida State
1994	Robert Baldwin	RB	Duke
1995	Danny Kanell	QB	Florida State
1996	Tiki Barber	RB	Virginia
1997	Andre Wadsworth	DE	Florida State
1998	Torry Holt	WR	NC State
1999	Joe Hamilton	QB	Georgia Tech
2000	Chris Weinke	QB	Florida State
2001	E. J. Henderson	LB	Maryland
2002	Matt Schaub	QB	Virginia
2003	Philip Rivers	QB	NC State
2004	Bryan Randall	QB	Virginia Tech
2005	Chris Barclay	RB	Wake Forest
2006	Calvin Johnson	WR	Georgia Tech
2007	Matt Ryan	QB	Boston College
2008	Jonathan Dwyer	RB	Georgia Tech
2009	C. J. Spiller	RB/RS	Clemson
2010	Tyrod Taylor	QB	Virginia Tech
2011	David Wilson	RB	Virginia Tech
2012	Tajh Boyd	QB	Clemson
2013	Jameis Winston	QB	Florida State
2014	James Conner	RB	Pittsburgh
2015	Deshaun Watson	QB	Clemson
2016	Lamar Jackson	QB	Louisville
2017	Lamar Jackson (2)	QB	Louisville
2018	Travis Etienne	RB	Clemson
2019	Travis Etienne (2)	RB	Clemson
2020	Trevor Lawrence	QB	Clemson
2021	Kenny Pickett	QB	Pittsburgh
2022	Drake Maye	QB	North Carolina
2023	Jordan Travis	QB	Florida State
2024	Cam Ward	QB	Miami (FL)
2025	Haynes King	QB	Georgia Tech

== Rookie of the Year ==
Season	Winner	Pos.	Team
1975	Ted Brown	RB	NC State
1976	James McDougald	RB	Wake Forest
1977	Amos Lawrence	RB	North Carolina
1978	Darrell Nicholson	LB	North Carolina
1979	Chuck McSwain	RB	Clemson
1980	Ben Bennett	QB	Duke
1981	Joe McIntosh	RB	NC State
1982	Michael Ramseur	RB	Wake Forest
1983	Cory Collier	RB	Georgia Tech
1984	John Ford	WR	Virginia
1985	Jerry Mays	RB	Georgia Tech
1986	Ray Agnew	DT	NC State
1987	Terry Allen	RB	Clemson
1988	Jessee Campbell	CB	NC State
1989	Shawn Jones	QB	Georgia Tech
1990	Ronald Williams	RB	Clemson
1991	Jimy Lincoln	RB	Georgia Tech
1992	Tamarick Vanover	WR	Florida State
1993	Leon Johnson	RB	North Carolina
1994	Ronde Barber	CB	Virginia
1995	Anthony Simmons	LB	Clemson
1996	Dré Bly	CB	North Carolina
1997	Travis Minor	RB	Florida State
1998	Ray Robinson	RB	NC State
1999	Koren Robinson	WR	NC State
2000	Philip Rivers	QB	NC State
2001	Chris Rix	QB	Florida State
2002	T. A. McLendon	RB	NC State
2003	Reggie Ball	QB	Georgia Tech
2004	Calvin Johnson	WR	Georgia Tech
2005	James Davis	RB	Clemson
2006	Riley Skinner	QB	Wake Forest
2007	Josh Adams	RB	Wake Forest
2008	Russell Wilson	QB	NC State
2009	Ryan Williams	RB	Virginia Tech
2010	Danny O'Brien	QB	Maryland
2011	Sammy Watkins	WR	Clemson
2012	Duke Johnson	RB	Miami (FL)
2013	Jameis Winston	QB	Florida State
2014	Brad Kaaya	QB	Miami (FL)
2015	Jordan Whitehead	S	Pittsburgh
2016	Deondre Francois	QB	Florida State
2017	A. J. Dillon	RB	Boston College
2018	Trevor Lawrence	QB	Clemson
2019	Sam Howell	QB	North Carolina
2020	Kyren Williams	RB	Notre Dame
2021	Tyler Van Dyke	QB	Miami (FL)
2022	Drake Maye	QB	North Carolina
2023	KC Concepcion	WR	NC State
2024	Isaac Brown	RB	Louisville
2025	Malachi Toney	WR	Miami

== Offensive Player of the Year ==
Season	Winner	Pos.	Team
1993	Charlie Ward	QB	Florida State
1994	Robert Baldwin	RB	Duke
1995	Danny Kanell	QB	Florida State
1996	Tiki Barber	RB	Virginia
1997	Thad Busby	QB	Florida State
1998	Torry Holt	WR	NC State
1999	Joe Hamilton	QB	Georgia Tech
2000	Chris Weinke	QB	Florida State
2001	Bruce Perry	RB	Maryland
2002	Matt Schaub	QB	Virginia
2003	Philip Rivers	QB	NC State
2004	Bryan Randall	QB	Virginia Tech
2005	Chris Barclay	RB	Wake Forest
2006	Calvin Johnson	WR	Georgia Tech
2007	Matt Ryan	QB	Boston College
2008	Jonathan Dwyer	RB	Georgia Tech
2009	C. J. Spiller	RB/RS	Clemson
2010	Tyrod Taylor	QB	Virginia Tech
2011	David Wilson	RB	Virginia Tech
2012	Tajh Boyd	QB	Clemson
2013	Jameis Winston	QB	Florida State
2014	James Conner	RB	Pittsburgh
2015	Deshaun Watson	QB	Clemson
2016	Lamar Jackson	QB	Louisville
2017	Lamar Jackson (2)	QB	Louisville
2018	Travis Etienne	RB	Clemson
2019	Travis Etienne (2)	RB	Clemson
2020	Trevor Lawrence	QB	Clemson
2021	Kenny Pickett	QB	Pittsburgh
2022	Drake Maye	QB	North Carolina
2023	Jordan Travis	QB	Florida State
2024	Cam Ward	QB	Miami (FL)
2025	Haynes King	QB	Georgia Tech

== Defensive Player of the Year ==
Season	Winner	Pos.	Team
1993	Derrick Brooks	LB	Florida State
1994	Derrick Alexander	DE	Florida State
1995	Marcus Jones	DE	North Carolina
1996	Peter Boulware	LB	Florida State
1997	Andre Wadsworth	DE	Florida State
1998	Anthony Poindexter	S	Virginia
1999	Keith Adams	LB	Clemson
2000	Levar Fisher	LB	NC State
2001	E. J. Henderson	LB	Maryland
2002	E. J. Henderson (2)	LB	Maryland
2003	Darnell Dockett	DT	Florida State
2004	Leroy Hill	LB	Clemson
2005	D'Qwell Jackson	LB	Maryland
2006	Gaines Adams	DE	Clemson
2007	Chris Long	DE	Virginia
2008	Mark Herzlich	LB	Boston College
2009	Derrick Morgan	DE	Georgia Tech
2010	Da'Quan Bowers	DE	Clemson
2011	Luke Kuechly	LB	Boston College
2012	Björn Werner	DE	Florida State
2013	Aaron Donald	DT	Pittsburgh
2014	Vic Beasley	DE	Clemson
2015	Jeremy Cash	S	Duke
2016	Ben Boulware	LB	Clemson
2016	DeMarcus Walker	DE	Florida State
2017	Bradley Chubb	DE	NC State
2018	Clelin Ferrell	DE	Clemson
2019	Isaiah Simmons	LB	Clemson
2020	Jeremiah Owusu-Koramoah	LB	Notre Dame
2021	Jermaine Johnson II	DE	Florida State
2022	Calijah Kancey	DT	Pittsburgh
2023	Payton Wilson	LB	NC State
2024	Donovan Ezeiruaku	DE	Boston College
2025	Rueben Bain Jr.	DE	Miami

== Offensive Rookie of the Year ==
Season	Winner	Pos.	Team
2007	Josh Adams	RB	Wake Forest
2008	Russell Wilson	QB	NC State
2009	Ryan Williams	RB	Virginia Tech
2010	Danny O'Brien	QB	Maryland
2011	Sammy Watkins	WR	Clemson
2012	Duke Johnson	RB	Miami (FL)
2013	Jameis Winston	QB	Florida State
2014	Brad Kaaya	QB	Miami (FL)
2015	Qadree Ollison	RB	Pittsburgh
2016	Deondre Francois	QB	Florida State
2017	A. J. Dillon	RB	Boston College
2018	Trevor Lawrence	QB	Clemson
2019	Sam Howell	QB	North Carolina
2020	Kyren Williams	RB	Notre Dame
2021	Tyler Van Dyke	QB	Miami (FL)
2022	Drake Maye	QB	North Carolina
2023	KC Concepcion	WR	NC State
2024	Isaac Brown	RB	Louisville
2025	Malachi Toney	WR	Miami

== Defensive Rookie of the Year ==
Season	Winner	Pos.	Team
2006	Myron Rolle	S	Florida State
2007	Deunta Williams	S	North Carolina
2008	Sean Spence	LB	Miami (FL)
2009	Luke Kuechly	LB	Boston College
2010	Xavier Rhodes	CB	Florida State
2011	Merrill Noel	CB	Wake Forest
2012	Ronald Darby	CB	Florida State
2013	Kendall Fuller	CB	Virginia Tech
2014	Quin Blanding	S	Virginia
2015	Jordan Whitehead	S	Pittsburgh
2016	Dexter Lawrence	DT	Clemson
2017	Brenton Nelson	S	Virginia
2018	Andre Cisco	S	Syracuse
2019	Greg Rousseau	DE	Miami (FL)
2020	Bryan Bresee	DT	Clemson
2021	Andrew Mukuba	S	Clemson
2022	Patrick Payton	DE	Florida State
2023	Rueben Bain Jr.	DE	Miami (FL)
2024	Sammy Brown	LB	Clemson
2025	Luke Ferrelli	LB	California

== Brian Piccolo Award ==
- 1970: Paul Miller, QB, North Carolina
- 1971: Jim Webster, LB, North Carolina
- 1972: Mark Johnson, QB, Duke
- 1973: Al Neville, QB, Maryland
- 1974: David Visaggio, DG, Maryland
- 1975: Scott Gardner, QB, Virginia
- 1976: Jeff Green, DE, Duke
- 1977: Ralph Stringer, DB, NC State
- 1978: Rex Varn, DB, Clemson
- 1979: Al Richardson, LB, Georgia Tech
- 1980: Jack Cain, DB, Clemson
- 1981: Aaron Stewart, DB, Duke
- 1982: Kenny Duckett, WR, Wake Forest
- 1983: John Piedmonte, OLB, Wake Forest
- 1984: J. D. Maarleveld, T, Maryland
- 1985: Danny Burmeister, DB, N. Carolina
- 1986: Ray Williams, WR, Clemson
- 1987: No Recipient
- 1988: Jerry Mays, TB, Georgia Tech
- 1989: Michael Anderson, RB, Maryland
- 1990: Marc Mays, WR, Duke
- 1991: Scott Adell, T, NC State
- 1992: Dan Footman, DE, Florida State; Randy Cuthbert, TB, Duke
- 1993: Scott Youmans, DL, Duke
- 1994: Chris Harrison, T, Virginia
- 1995: Warren Forney, DT, Clemson
- 1996: John Lewis, RB, Wake Forest
- 1997: Sam Cowart, LB, Florida State
- 1998: Anthony Poindexter, DB, Virginia; Corey Simon, DT, Florida State
- 1999: Chris Weinke, QB, Florida State
- 2000: Ed Wilder, FB, Georgia Tech
- 2001: Matt Crawford, T, Maryland
- 2002: Anquan Boldin, WR, Florida State
- 2003: Kevin Bailey, OL, Virginia
- 2004: Frank Gore, RB, Miami
- 2005: Ryan Best, S, Virginia
- 2006: Glenn Sharpe, Miami
- 2007: Matt Robinson, DE, Wake Forest
- 2008: Robert Quinn, DE, North Carolina
- 2009: Toney Baker, RB, NC State
- 2010: Mark Herzlich, LB, Boston College; Nate Irving, LB, NC State
- 2011: Giovani Bernard, RB, North Carolina
- 2012: Shayon Green, DE, Miami; Chris Thompson, RB, Florida State
- 2013: Robert Godhigh, RB, Georgia Tech
- 2014: Duke Johnson, RB, Miami
- 2015: Hunter Knighton, OL, Miami
- 2016: James Conner, RB, Pittsburgh
- 2017: Trevon Young, DE/OLB, Louisville
- 2018: Greg Dortch, WR, Wake Forest
- 2019: Richard Yeargin, DE, Boston College
- 2020: Nolan Cooney, P, Syracuse
- 2021: McKenzie Milton, QB, Florida State; Justyn Ross, WR, Clemson
- 2022: Sam Hartman, QB, Wake Forest
- 2023: Mike Hollins, RB, Virginia
- 2024: Eli Pancol, WR, Duke
- 2025: Bryce Steele, LB, Boston College; Keylan Rutledge, OL, Georgia Tech

== 50th anniversary team ==
- Bill Armstrong, Wake Forest (1973–1976)
- Tiki Barber, Virginia (1993–1996)
- Dré Bly, North Carolina (1996–1998)
- Joe Bostic, Clemson (1975–1978)
- Peter Boulware, Florida State (1994–1996)
- Derrick Brooks, Florida State (1991–1994)
- Ted Brown, NC State (1975–1978)
- Kelvin Bryant, North Carolina (1979–1982)
- Jerry Butler, Clemson (1975–1978)
- Dennis Byrd, NC State (1965–1967)
- Dick Christy, NC State (1955–1957)
- Marco Coleman, Georgia Tech (1989–1991)
- Bennie Cunningham, Clemson (1973–1975)
- Jeff Davis, Clemson (1978–1981)
- Jim Dombrowski, Virginia (1982–1985)
- Warrick Dunn, Florida State (1993–1996)
- Boomer Esiason, Maryland (1981–1983)
- Steve Fuller, Clemson (1975–1978)
- William Fuller, North Carolina (1980–1983)
- Roman Gabriel, NC State (1960–1961)
- Joe Hamilton, Georgia Tech (1996–1999)
- Alex Hawkins, South Carolina (1956–1958)
- Clarkston Hines, Duke (1986–1989)
- Torry Holt, NC State (1995–1998)
- Sebastian Janikowski, Florida State (1997–1999)
- Marvin Jones, Florida State (1990–1992)
- Stan Jones, Maryland (1951–1953)
- Terry Kinard, Clemson (1978–1982)
- Amos Lawrence, North Carolina (1977–1980)
- Bob Matheson, Duke (1964–1966)
- Don McCauley, North Carolina (1968–1970)
- Mike McGee, Duke (1957–1959)
- Herman Moore, Virginia (1988–1990)
- Bob Pellegrini, Maryland (1953–1955)
- Julius Peppers, North Carolina (1999–2001)
- Michael Dean Perry, Clemson (1984–1987)
- William Perry, Clemson (1981–1984)
- Brian Piccolo, Wake Forest (1962–1964)
- Frank Quayle, Virginia (1966–1968)
- Jim Ritcher, NC State (1976–1979)
- Anthony Simmons, Clemson (1995–1997)
- Chris Slade, Virginia (1988–1992)
- Norm Snead, Wake Forest (1958–1960)
- Ken Swilling, Georgia Tech (1988–1991)
- Lawrence Taylor, North Carolina (1978–1980)
- Mike Voight, North Carolina (1973–1976)
- Charlie Ward, Florida State (1990–1993)
- Peter Warrick, Florida State (1996–1999)
- Chris Weinke, Florida State (1997–2000)
- Randy White, Maryland (1972–1974)
