= 1954 Orange Bowl =

American college football game

- 20th Orange Bowl
- Burdine Stadium in Miami, Florida, hosted the Orange Bowl.
Oklahoma Sooners	Maryland Terrapins
(8–1–1)	(10–0)
Big Seven	ACC
7	0
Head coach: Bud Wilkinson	Head coach: Jim Tatum
AP / Coaches; 4 / 5	AP / Coaches; 1 / 1
	1	2	3	4	Total
Oklahoma	0	7	0	0	7
Maryland	0	0	0	0	0
- Date: January 1, 1954
- Season: 1953
- Stadium: Burdine Stadium
- Location: Miami, Florida
- Favorite: Maryland −7
- Referee: George D. Watson (ACC; split crew: ACC, Big Seven)
- Attendance: 68,640
- Payout: US$121,308

United States TV coverage
- Network: CBS
- Announcers: Red Barber

The 1954 Orange Bowl was a postseason American college football bowl game between the first-ranked Maryland Terrapins and the fourth-ranked Oklahoma Sooners. It was the twentieth edition of the Orange Bowl and took place at the Orange Bowl stadium in Miami, Florida on January 1, 1954.

The game was the first Orange Bowl to feature tie-ins between the Big Seven Conference and the Atlantic Coast Conference (ACC) champions. It was the first-ever meeting of the two teams. Maryland and Oklahoma were head coached by former colleagues Jim Tatum and Bud Wilkinson, respectively, who had previously coached together at the United States Navy's Iowa Pre-Flight School and the University of Oklahoma.

== Pre-game buildup ==
The game was the first postseason bowl game in which the players were required to play on both the offense and defense. This was a result of the NCAA's newly instituted "one-platoon" rules that limited player substitutions. It also featured the Orange Bowl's first conference tie-in between the Big Seven and the ACC.

=== Maryland ===
Maryland's head coach was Jim Tatum, who had compiled a record of 56–11–3. Before coming to Maryland, he spent one year as the Oklahoma head coach in 1946, where Bud Wilkinson had served as his assistant coach. The Maryland team was ranked first in the nation in the final rankings of both the Associated Press (AP) Poll and the United Press Coaches' Poll. Maryland finished the regular season with a perfect 10–0 record with the narrowest win being a 20–6 victory over Don Faurot's Missouri. They also recorded shutout wins over 11th-ranked Mississippi, 38–0, and 11th-ranked Alabama, 21–0. Tatum said, "this is the greatest team I ever coached."

During the regular season, the Maryland defense allowed opponents to score 31 points in ten games and recorded six defensive shut-outs. Only Georgia scored more than seven points. No ACC team has since held opponents to an equal or lesser number of points. Maryland's rushing defense (83.9 yards allowed per game) and scoring defense (3.1 points allowed per game) ranked first in the nation. Maryland outscored its opponents 298–31. No ACC team scored more total points until 1967. Maryland's star quarterback, Bernie Faloney, was injured midseason and saw limited game action for the remainder of the year. Back-up quarterback Charlie Boxold filled in for the majority of the Orange Bowl.

=== Oklahoma ===
Oklahoma was led by seventh-year head coach Bud Wilkinson. He assumed the position after Tatum resigned to leave for Maryland. The two had also served as assistant coaches in the U.S. Navy for the Iowa Pre-Flight football team under Don Faurot. Faurot pioneered the split-T offense that both Tatum and Wilkinsons' teams employed. Since taking over at Oklahoma, Wilkinson had a 62–8–3 record. Oklahoma entered the game on an eight-game winning streak with a single loss in the season-opener to Notre Dame and a tie in week 2 against Pittsburgh. Oklahoma also had an injured quarterback; second-stringer Pat O'Neal separated his sternum at Miami and missed the game.

Wilkinson reportedly compiled fake playbooks and had them distributed where they would be discovered by Maryland personnel. Wilkinson later admitted that he had indeed used the ruse on occasion, without specifically stating it was employed before the 1954 Orange Bowl.

== Game summary ==
In the first quarter, Maryland started with the wind to their backs. Bill Walker kicked a punt that pinned Oklahoma on their own one-foot line. Oklahoma quarterback Gene Calame rushed twice to gain some breathing room before the Sooners punted it away. Maryland took over on the Oklahoma 37-yard line. Quarterback Charlie Boxold completed a nine-yard pass to Dick Nolan. Halfback Chet Hanulak then connected with Nolan again. That was followed by a first down by fullback Ralph Felton on the Oklahoma four-yard line. Hanulak rushed to pick up two yards. Nolan then ran to the left but was stopped by Oklahoma back Larry Grigg for no gain. Hanulak rushed again to pick up one more yard. Felton rushed from the one-yard line, but was stopped six inches shy of the end zone, and Maryland turned over on downs. Maryland again drove inside the Oklahoma 10-yard line. Wilkinson sent in the alternate line-up and Oklahoma again stopped Maryland short. The Sooners fumbled at their own 20-yard line, but the Terrapins again failed to capitalize.

In the second quarter, Maryland advanced to the Oklahoma 20-yard line, and Tatum elected for a field goal attempt. Now against the wind, the kick failed, with the ball going wide right. The Sooners took over on downs and halfback Jack Ging completed a pass to end Max Boydston for a five-yard gain. Ging then rushed for three yards. On the next play, Calame pitched to Grigg who ran to the left and picked up 12 yards for a first down. Calame then completed a pass to back Bob Burris for six yards. Grigg faked a pass and ran to the right for a gain of 12 yards and a first down on the Maryland 39-yard line. The Terrapins stopped two Sooner rushing attempts before Calame connected with Burris again for an 11-yard gain. Burris then rushed for three more yards to advance to the Maryland 25. Tatum called a time-out. On third down with one yard to go, Calame faked a handoff to Ging and executed an option run to the left. He pitched to Grigg and threw a block. Grigg was tackled at the goal-line but managed to extend his body into the endzone. Buddy Leake made the extra point. Shortly before halftime, Calame suffered a separated collarbone. With back-up Pat O'Neal also injured, only third-string quarterback Jack Van Pool remained, and he had little game experience.

In the third quarter, Walker attempted to punt for Maryland. Oklahoma tackle Don Brown escaped a block from Stan Jones and closed in on Walker. The punter held onto the ball and attempted to run, but Brown tackled him for a 12-yard loss. Later, Leake punted and Hanulak returned and threatened to score. Leake, the last man between Hanulak and the endzone, made the tackle.

In the fourth quarter, Boxold threw a long pass into the endzone, but it was intercepted by Grigg for a touchback with four minutes remaining. Van Pool led a 41-yard drive to the Maryland 39-yard line before time expired.

== Statistical summary ==
Statistical Comparison	UM	OU
First downs	13	10
Passing yards	36	22
Rushing yards	176	208
Return yards	25	7
Total yards	250	247
Passing (cmp–att)	5–12	4–6
Punts (#–avg)	5–29.0	7–31.3
Penalty yards	15	45
Fumbles (#–lost)	1–1	2–2

Oklahoma back Larry Grigg managed to score the only touchdown of the game and Buddy Leake made the extra point. Grigg led the Sooners in rushing with 89 yards on 13 carries. Maryland was led by Felton who gained 51 yards on ten carries.

Quarterback Charlie Boxold led Maryland in passing with three completions on nine attempts for 42 yards. Dick Nolan led in receiving with two receptions for 31 yards. Oklahoma's passing was led by quarterback Gene Calame before he was put out of the game by injury. He completed four of four pass attempts for 22 yards. Bob Burris was the Sooners' leading receiver with three receptions for 17 yards.

== Post-game effects ==
At the time, the final rankings were declared before postseason games. Therefore, Maryland had been declared the national championship team by the Associated Press, United Press, and International News Service, and remained the consensus national champions despite the loss. Some selectors have retroactively named Notre Dame and Oklahoma the national champions. With a 10–1 finish, Maryland possessed the best record in the nation. It was the first time Maryland had suffered a shutout in 51 games, the last being in 1948 at the hands of Vanderbilt.

For Oklahoma, it was their ninth-straight win, and the team finished the 1953 season with a 9–1–1 record. The game was part of a streak that, under head coach Wilkinson, would last 47 games. To date, that winning streak is the longest compiled by any NCAA major college football team.

Oklahoma head coach Wilkinson declined to declare his team the national champions. He addressed his team in the locker room, saying, "It was a helluva ball game. Desire, spirit, effort—anything you want to call it—won for us today." Maryland head coach Tatum said at the post-game party, "Bud outcoached me."
