= Paul Amen =

American sportsman

- Amen pictured in The Howler 1959, Wake Forest yearbook

Biographical details
- Born: July 6, 1916; Lincoln, Nebraska, U.S.
- Died: June 4, 2005 (aged 88); Lincoln, Nebraska, U.S.

Playing career

Football
- 1935–1937: Nebraska

Basketball
- 1935–1938: Nebraska

Baseball
- 1936–1938: Nebraska
- 1938: Dallas Steers
- 1939: Youngstown Browns
- Position: End (football)

Coaching career (HC unless noted)

Football
- 1939–1940: Nebraska (assistant)
- 1943–1955: Army (assistant)
- 1956–1959: Wake Forest

Basketball
- 1940–1941: Nebraska (assistant)

Baseball
- 1943–1954: Army

Head coaching record
- Overall: 11–26–3 (football); 133–76–7 (baseball)

Accomplishments and honors

Awards
- 2× ACC Coach of the Year (1956, 1959); Second-team All-Big Six (1937)

Paul Johannes Amen (July 6, 1916 – June 4, 2005) was a prominent Nebraskan with notable accomplishments in both athletics and banking. He served as the head football coach at Wake Forest University from 1956 to 1959, compiling a record of 11–26–3. Amen was also the head baseball coach at the United States Military Academy from 1943 to 1954, tallying a mark of 133–76–7.

== Playing career ==
Amen lettered in football, basketball, and baseball at the University of Nebraska. He was a member of the first U.S. Olympic baseball team at the 1936 Summer Olympics in Berlin and played in the minor leagues in 1938 and 1939 before ending his athletic playing career.

== Coaching career ==
Amen earned a master's degree in education from the University of Nebraska in 1940 while an assistant football coach there under Biff Jones. From 1943 to 1955, he was an assistant football coach and head baseball coach at West Point. He was a founding member of the American Baseball Coaches Association in 1945, serving as its president in 1952. Amen then became head football coach at Wake Forest University in 1956, where he was named ACC Coach of the Year in 1956 and 1959.

== Banking career and death ==
After leaving Wake Forest, Amen retired from sports and begin a career at Wachovia Bank in Charlotte, North Carolina, where he rose to the rank of vice president. He then moved back to his birthplace to become president of the National Bank of Commerce in Lincoln, Nebraska. In 1979, Amen was appointed Director of the Nebraska Department of Banking and Finance by Governor Charles Thone. He submitted his resignation as State banking director in 1983 to Governor Bob Kerrey within weeks of the collapse of Commonwealth Savings Company in Lincoln. Investigations showed that he had borne no responsibility for its failure. Amen died on June 4, 2005.

== Head coaching record ==
=== Football ===
| Year | Team | Overall | Conference | Standing | Bowl/playoffs |
|---|---|---|---|---|---|
Wake Forest Demon Deacons (Atlantic Coast Conference) (1956–1959)
| 1956 | Wake Forest | 2–5–3 | 1–5–1 | 7th | |
| 1957 | Wake Forest | 0–10 | 0–7 | 8th | |
| 1958 | Wake Forest | 3–7 | 2–4 | 6th | |
| 1959 | Wake Forest | 6–4 | 4–3 | T–4th | |
| Wake Forest: | | 11–26–3 | 7–19–1 | | |
| Total: | | 11–26–3 | | | |
