= 1958 West Virginia Mountaineers football team =

American college football season

1958 West Virginia Mountaineers football

SoCon champion
- Conference: Southern Conference
- Record: 4–5–1 (4–0 SoCon)
- Head coach: Art Lewis (9th season)
- Home stadium: Mountaineer Field

1958 Southern Conference football standings
	Conf.					Overall
Team	W		L		T	W		L		T
West Virginia $	4	–	0	–	0	4	–	5	–	1
VPI	3	–	1	–	0	5	–	4	–	1
George Washington	3	–	2	–	0	3	–	5	–	0
VMI	2	–	2	–	1	6	–	2	–	2
Richmond	3	–	4	–	0	3	–	7	–	0
The Citadel	2	–	3	–	0	4	–	6	–	0
Davidson	2	–	3	–	0	5	–	4	–	0
Furman	1	–	2	–	0	2	–	7	–	0
William & Mary	1	–	4	–	1	2	–	6	–	1
$ – Conference champion

The 1958 West Virginia Mountaineers football team represented West Virginia University as a member of the Southern Conference (SoCon) during the 1958 college football season. Led by ninth-year head coach Art Lewis, the Mountaineers compiled an overall record of 4–5–1 with a mark of 4–0 in conference play, winning the SoCon title for the fifth time in six seasons.

== Schedule ==
Date	Opponent	Rank	Site	Result	Attendance	Source
September 20	Richmond		Mountaineer Field; Morgantown, WV	W 66–22	20,000	
September 27	at No. 2 Oklahoma*	No. 13	Oklahoma Memorial Stadium; Norman, OK	L 14–47	55,432	
October 4	at Indiana*		Memorial Stadium; Bloomington, IN	L 12–13	20,000	
October 11	Boston University*		Mountaineer Field; Morgantown, WV	L 30–36	20,000	
October 18	at Pittsburgh*		Pitt Stadium; Pittsburgh, PA (rivalry)	L 8–15	42,269	
October 25	vs. VPI		City Stadium; Richmond, VA (Tobacco Bowl, rivalry)	W 21–20	22,000	
November 1	George Washington		Mountaineer Field; Morgantown, WV	W 35–12	13,000	
November 8	Penn State*^{†}		Mountaineer Field; Morgantown, WV (rivalry)	T 14–14	26,000	
November 15	at William & Mary		Cary Field; Williamsburg, VA	W 56–6		
November 22	No. 10 Syracuse*		Mountaineer Field; Morgantown, WV (rivalry)	L 12–15	25,000	
*Non-conference game; ^{†}Homecoming; Rankings from AP Poll released prior to the game
