= Jack Hennemier =

American gridiron football player, coach, and scout

- Hennemier during his playing career at Duke

Biographical details
- Born: c. 1913; Savannah, Georgia, U.S.
- Died: November 6, 1993 (aged 80); Charlotte, North Carolina, U.S.

Playing career
- 1933–1935: Duke
- Positions: Center, guard

Coaching career (HC unless noted)
- 1948–1954: Maryland (DL)
- 1955–1956: Calgary Stampeders
- 1957–1958: Maryland (DL/RC)

John M. Hennemier (c. 1913 – November 6, 1993) was an American gridiron football coach and scout. He served as the head coach for the Calgary Stampeders of the Canadian Football League (CFL) for one and a half seasons, and also held assistant coaching positions at several colleges, most notably, the University of Maryland, College Park where he helped Jim Tatum coach the Terrapins to the 1953 national championship. After his brief stint in the CFL, Hennemier worked as a professional football scout. He attended Duke University, where he played college football as a center and was named the team's most valuable player.

== Biography ==
He was born circa 1913 in Savannah, Georgia, and attended Savannah High School. In 1931, Hennemier enrolled at Duke University where he studied business administration and was a member of the Sigma Alpha Epsilon fraternity. He played college football for the Blue Devils under head coach Wallace Wade. Hennemier played as a center and guard, and he was a member of the varsity team from 1933 to 1935. As a senior in 1935, he was named the team's most valuable player. In 1935, he was named to the All-Southern Conference third team. At his heaviest, Hennemier weighed between 150 and 155 pounds, but because of his aggressiveness despite his small size, he was nicknamed "Scrappy Jack". He graduated with the Class of 1936.

In 1948, he joined the coaching staff of Jim Tatum at Maryland, and Hennemier remained there as the "chief defensive coach" through the 1954 season. He served as an assistant coach responsible for the defensive line, and during this time, Maryland won the 1953 national championship. During Hennemier's first tenure at Maryland, the Terrapins compiled a record of 56–12–2, and outscored their opponents by a margin of 1,924 points to 599. Maryland also recorded 21 defensive shutouts.

In 1955, Hennemier left Maryland to take the head coaching job with the Calgary Stampeders of the Canadian Football League (CFL). That season, the team posted a 4–12 record to finish last in the Western Division. Hennemier nearly signed Forrest Gregg, a tackle in the National Football League (NFL) who Vince Lombardi called "the finest player [he] ever coached." Hennemier flew to Dallas to meet with Gregg, and over dinner offered him a $7,500 contract with a $500 signing bonus ($90,140 and $6,009, respectively, in inflation-adjusted terms). When the Green Bay Packers, who had also shown him interest, matched the contract and offered to match half of the signing bonus, Gregg agreed to sign with the Packers. In February 1955, the Washington Redskins of the NFL sued Hennemier for $50,000 in damages ($600,932 adjusted for inflation) for an alleged attempt to lure away two of its tackles. The clubs agreed to a truce and eschewed "raiding" each other's rosters. Hennemier was fired during the 1956 season, and the Stampeders again finished last in their division.

In 1957, he returned to Maryland to coach the line and handle recruiting duties. He held that position through the 1958 season during the tenure of head coach Tommy Mont. His second stint at Maryland was less successful than his earlier one, and the Terrapins compiled a record of 9–11 during those two seasons. Hennemier also held coaching positions at Duke, North Carolina, Washington & Lee, and Savannah High School. and later worked as a professional football scout. He was inducted into the Greater Savannah Athletic Hall of Fame in 1970. Hennemier died on November 6, 1993, in Charlotte, North Carolina.
