= 1958 William & Mary Indians football team =

American college football season

1958 William & Mary Indians football
- Conference: Southern Conference
- Record: 2–6–1 (1–4–1 SoCon)
- Head coach: Milt Drewer (2nd season)
- Captains: Dan Plummer; Tom Secules
- Home stadium: Cary Field

1958 Southern Conference football standings
	Conf.					Overall
Team	W		L		T	W		L		T
West Virginia $	4	–	0	–	0	4	–	5	–	1
VPI	3	–	1	–	0	5	–	4	–	1
George Washington	3	–	2	–	0	3	–	5	–	0
VMI	2	–	2	–	1	6	–	2	–	2
Richmond	3	–	4	–	0	3	–	7	–	0
The Citadel	2	–	3	–	0	4	–	6	–	0
Davidson	2	–	3	–	0	5	–	4	–	0
Furman	1	–	2	–	0	2	–	7	–	0
William & Mary	1	–	4	–	1	2	–	6	–	1
$ – Conference champion

The 1958 William & Mary Indians football team represented the College of William & Mary as a member of the Southern Conference (SoCon) during the 1958 college football season. Led by second-year head coach Milt Drewer the Indians compiled an overall record of 2–6–1 with a mark of 1–4–1 in conference play, and finished ninth in the SoCon. William & Mary played home games at Cary Field in Williamsburg, Virginia.

== Schedule ==
Date	Opponent	Site	Result	Attendance	Source
September 27	at No. 12 Navy*	Thompson Stadium; Annapolis, MD	L 0–14	12,000	
October 4	at VPI	Miles Stadium; Blacksburg, VA	L 15–27	15,000	
October 11	vs. VMI	Mitchell Stadium; Bluefield, WV (rivalry)	T 6–6	5,000	
October 18	NC State*	Cary Field; Williamsburg, VA	W 13–6		
October 24	at George Washington	Griffith Stadium; Washington, DC	L 0–7		
November 1	at Boston University*	Boston University Field; Boston, MA	L 7–33	5,500	
November 8	Davidson	Cary Field; Williamsburg, VA	L 7–16	8,500	
November 15	West Virginia	Cary Field; Williamsburg, VA	L 6–55		
November 27	at Richmond	City Stadium; Richmond, VA (rivalry)	W 18–15	9,000	
*Non-conference game; Rankings from AP Poll released prior to the game

== NFL draft selections ==
= Pro Football Hall of Fame	= Canadian Football Hall of Fame	= College Football Hall of Fame

Year	Round	Pick	Overall	Name	Team	Position
1959	17	1	193	Tom Secules	Green Bay Packers	Back
1959	22	8	260	Lennie Rubal	Chicago Bears	Back
