= 1958 George Washington Colonials football team =

American college football season

1958 George Washington Colonials football
- Conference: Southern Conference
- Record: 3–5 (3–2 SoCon)
- Head coach: Bo Sherman (7th season)
- Home stadium: Griffith Stadium

1958 Southern Conference football standings
	Conf.					Overall
Team	W		L		T	W		L		T
West Virginia $	4	–	0	–	0	4	–	5	–	1
VPI	3	–	1	–	0	5	–	4	–	1
George Washington	3	–	2	–	0	3	–	5	–	0
VMI	2	–	2	–	1	6	–	2	–	2
Richmond	3	–	4	–	0	3	–	7	–	0
The Citadel	2	–	3	–	0	4	–	6	–	0
Davidson	2	–	3	–	0	5	–	4	–	0
Furman	1	–	2	–	0	2	–	7	–	0
William & Mary	1	–	4	–	1	2	–	6	–	1
$ – Conference champion

The 1958 George Washington Colonials football team was an American football team that represented George Washington University as part of the Southern Conference during the 1958 college football season. In their seventh season under head coach Bo Sherman, the team compiled a 3–5 record (3–2 in the SoCon).

== Schedule ==
Date	Opponent	Site	Result	Attendance	Source
September 19	at Detroit*	University of Detroit Stadium; Detroit, MI	L 6–21	19,271	
October 3	Furman	Griffith Stadium; Washington, DC	W 11–8	4,500	
October 17	Richmond	Griffith Stadium; Washington, DC	L 6–26	3,500	
October 24	William & Mary	Griffith Stadium; Washington, DC	W 7–0	8,000	
November 1	at West Virginia	Mountaineer Field; Morgantown, WV	L 12–35	13,000	
November 15	Navy*	Griffith Stadium; Washington, DC	L 8–28	12,000–14,500	
November 22	at Wichita*	Veterans Field; Wichita, KS	L 12–26	8,808	
November 29	at The Citadel	Johnson Hagood Stadium; Charleston, SC	W 20–14	7,600	
*Non-conference game
