= 1958 Duke Blue Devils football team =

American college football season

1958 Duke Blue Devils football
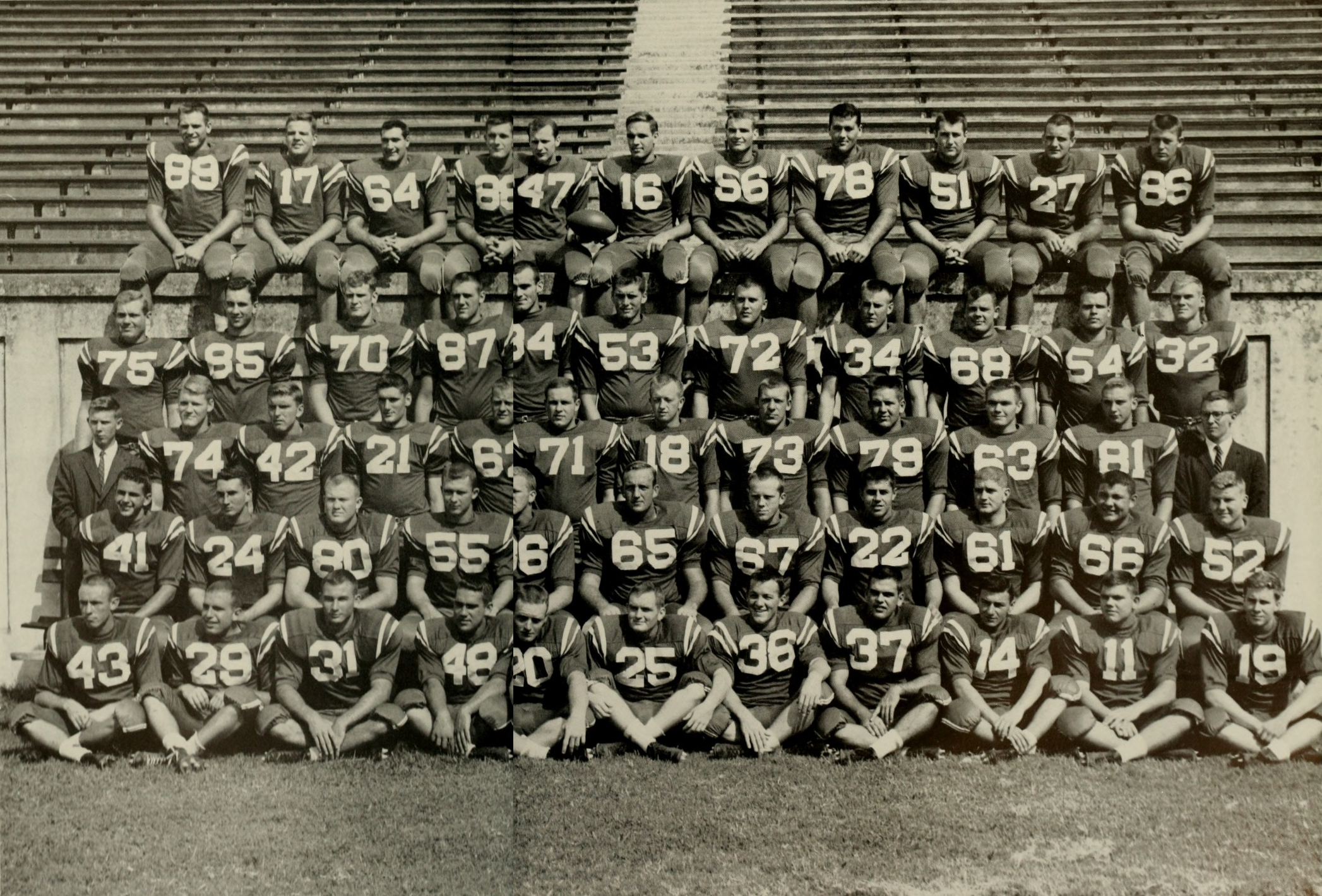
- Conference: Atlantic Coast Conference
- Record: 5–5 (3–2 ACC)
- Head coach: William D. Murray (8th season)
- MVP: George Dutrow
- Captain: Pryor Millner
- Home stadium: Duke Stadium

1958 Atlantic Coast Conference football standings
	Conf.					Overall
Team	W		L		T	W		L		T
No. 12 Clemson $	5	–	1	–	0	8	–	3	–	0
No. 15 South Carolina	5	–	2	–	0	7	–	3	–	0
Duke	3	–	2	–	0	5	–	5	–	0
North Carolina	4	–	3	–	0	6	–	4	–	0
Maryland	3	–	3	–	0	4	–	6	–	0
Wake Forest	2	–	4	–	0	3	–	7	–	0
NC State	2	–	5	–	0	2	–	7	–	1
Virginia	1	–	5	–	0	1	–	9	–	0
$ – Conference champion; Rankings from AP poll

The 1958 Duke Blue Devils football team was an American football team that represented Duke University as a member of the Atlantic Coast Conference (ACC) during the 1958 college football season. In their eighth year under head coach William D. Murray, the Blue Devils compiled an overall record of 5–5, with a conference record of 3–2, and finished third in the ACC.

== Schedule ==
Date	Opponent	Site	Result	Attendance	Source
September 20	at South Carolina	Carolina Stadium; Columbia, SC	L 0–8	38,000	
September 27	at Virginia	Scott Stadium; Charlottesville, VA	L 12–15	15,000	
October 4	Illinois*	Duke Stadium; Durham, NC	W 15–13	25,000	
October 11	Baylor*^{†}	Duke Stadium; Durham, NC	W 12–7	26,000	
October 18	at No. 12 Notre Dame*	Notre Dame Stadium; Notre Dame, IN	L 7–9	59,068	
October 25	NC State	Duke Stadium; Durham, NC (rivalry)	W 20–13	20,000	
November 1	Georgia Tech*	Duke Stadium; Durham, NC	L 8–10	30,000	
November 8	No. 1 LSU*	Tiger Stadium; Baton Rouge, LA	L 18–50	63,000	
November 15	at Wake Forest	Bowman Gray Stadium; Wake Forest, NC (rivalry)	W 29–0	20,000	
November 22	at No. 17 North Carolina	Kenan Memorial Stadium; Chapel Hill, NC (Victory Bell)	W 7–6	44,500	
*Non-conference game; ^{†}Homecoming; Rankings from AP Poll released prior to the game
