= 1958 Davidson Wildcats football team =

American college football season

1958 Davidson Wildcats football
- Conference: Southern Conference
- Record: 5–4 (2–3 SoCon)
- Head coach: Bill Dole (7th season)
- Home stadium: Richardson Stadium

1958 Southern Conference football standings
	Conf.					Overall
Team	W		L		T	W		L		T
West Virginia $	4	–	0	–	0	4	–	5	–	1
VPI	3	–	1	–	0	5	–	4	–	1
George Washington	3	–	2	–	0	3	–	5	–	0
VMI	2	–	2	–	1	6	–	2	–	2
Richmond	3	–	4	–	0	3	–	7	–	0
The Citadel	2	–	3	–	0	4	–	6	–	0
Davidson	2	–	3	–	0	5	–	4	–	0
Furman	1	–	2	–	0	2	–	7	–	0
William & Mary	1	–	4	–	1	2	–	6	–	1
$ – Conference champion

The 1958 Davidson Wildcats football team represented Davidson College as a member of the Southern Conference (SoCon) during the 1958 college football season. Led by seventh-year head coach Bill Dole, the Wildcats compiled an overall record of 5–4 with a mark of 2–3 in conference play, tying for sixth in the SoCon.

== Schedule ==
Date	Opponent	Site	Result	Attendance	Source
September 19	vs. Catawba*	American Legion Memorial Stadium; Charlotte, NC	L 17–22	3,600	
October 4	at The Citadel	Johnson Hagood Stadium; Charleston, SC	W 8–6	11,000	
October 11	at Presbyterian*	Bailey Stadium; Clinton, SC	W 7–6	3,800	
October 18	Carson–Newman*	Richardson Stadium; Davidson, NC	W 41–12		
October 25	VMI	Richardson Stadium; Davidson, NC	L 7–42	7,500	
November 1	at Wofford*	Snyder Field; Spartanburg, SC	W 21–20		
November 8	at William & Mary	Cary Field; Williamsburg, VA	W 16–7	8,500	
November 15	Richmond	Richardson Stadium; Davidson, NC	L 22–27		
November 22	vs. Furman	American Legion Memorial Stadium; Charlotte, NC	L 20–22	3,500	
*Non-conference game
