= 1958 The Citadel Bulldogs football team =

American college football season

1958 The Citadel Bulldogs football
- Conference: Southern Conference
- Record: 4–6 (2–3 SoCon)
- Head coach: Eddie Teague (2nd season)
- Home stadium: Johnson Hagood Stadium

1958 Southern Conference football standings
	Conf.					Overall
Team	W		L		T	W		L		T
West Virginia $	4	–	0	–	0	4	–	5	–	1
VPI	3	–	1	–	0	5	–	4	–	1
George Washington	3	–	2	–	0	3	–	5	–	0
VMI	2	–	2	–	1	6	–	2	–	2
Richmond	3	–	4	–	0	3	–	7	–	0
The Citadel	2	–	3	–	0	4	–	6	–	0
Davidson	2	–	3	–	0	5	–	4	–	0
Furman	1	–	2	–	0	2	–	7	–	0
William & Mary	1	–	4	–	1	2	–	6	–	1
$ – Conference champion

The 1958 The Citadel Bulldogs football team represented The Citadel, The Military College of South Carolina in the 1958 college football season. Eddie Teague served as head coach for the second season. The Bulldogs played as members of the Southern Conference and played home games at Johnson Hagood Stadium.

== Schedule ==
Date	Opponent	Site	Result	Attendance	Source
September 20	Newberry	Johnson Hagood Stadium; Charleston, SC	L 0–16	15,500	
October 4	Davidson	Johnson Hagood Stadium; Charleston, SC	L 6–8	11,000	
October 10	vs. Wofford*	County Fairgrounds; Orangeburg, SC (rivalry)	L 6–18	10,000	
October 18	at Memphis State*	Crump Stadium; Memphis, TN	W 28–26	8,408	
October 25	at Furman	Sirrine Stadium; Greenville, SC (rivalry)	W 24–6	8,000	
November 1	at Richmond	City Stadium; Richmond, VA	L 0–20	4,500	
November 8	Presbyterian*	Johnson Hagood Stadium; Charleston, SC	W 38–0		
November 15	VMI^{†}	Johnson Hagood Stadium; Charleston, SC (rivalry)	W 14–6	12,000	
November 22	at Georgia*	Sanford Stadium; Athens, GA	L 0–76	26,000	
November 29	George Washington	Johnson Hagood Stadium; Charleston, SC	L 14–20	7,600	
*Non-conference game; ^{†}Homecoming
