= 1958 Virginia Cavaliers football team =

American college football season

1958 Virginia Cavaliers football
- Conference: Atlantic Coast Conference
- Record: 1–9 (1–5 ACC)
- Head coach: Dick Voris (1st season)
- Captains: Reece Whitley; Frank Call
- Home stadium: Scott Stadium

1958 Atlantic Coast Conference football standings
	Conf.					Overall
Team	W		L		T	W		L		T
No. 12 Clemson $	5	–	1	–	0	8	–	3	–	0
No. 15 South Carolina	5	–	2	–	0	7	–	3	–	0
Duke	3	–	2	–	0	5	–	5	–	0
North Carolina	4	–	3	–	0	6	–	4	–	0
Maryland	3	–	3	–	0	4	–	6	–	0
Wake Forest	2	–	4	–	0	3	–	7	–	0
NC State	2	–	5	–	0	2	–	7	–	1
Virginia	1	–	5	–	0	1	–	9	–	0
$ – Conference champion; Rankings from AP poll

The 1958 Virginia Cavaliers football team represented the University of Virginia during the 1958 college football season. The Cavaliers were led by first-year head coach Dick Voris and played their home games at Scott Stadium in Charlottesville, Virginia. They competed as members of the Atlantic Coast Conference, finishing in last place. Don Shula had his first coaching job with this team, serving as defensive backs coach. Virginia finished with a 1–9 record that year.

== Schedule ==
Date	Opponent	Site	Result	Attendance	Source
September 20	at No. 18 Clemson	Memorial Stadium; Clemson, SC	L 15–20	20,000	
September 27	Duke	Scott Stadium; Charlottesville, VA	W 15–12	15,000	
October 4	NC State^{†}	Scott Stadium; Charlottesville, VA	L 14–26	16,000	
October 11	vs. VPI*	Victory Stadium; Roanoke, VA (Harvest Bowl, rivalry)	L 13–22	26,000	
October 18	at No. 1 Army*	Michie Stadium; West Point, NY	L 6–35	27,250	
October 25	at Vanderbilt*	Dudley Field; Nashville, TN	L 6–39	21,000	
November 1	vs. VMI*	Foreman Field; Norfolk, VA	L 0–33	15,000	
November 8	No. 15 North Carolina	Scott Stadium; Charlottesville, VA (South's Oldest Rivalry)	L 0–42	18,000	
November 15	at South Carolina	Carolina Stadium; Columbia, SC	L 14–28	20,000	
November 22	Maryland	Scott Stadium; Charlottesville, VA (rivalry)	L 6–44	18,000	
*Non-conference game; ^{†}Homecoming; Rankings from AP Poll released prior to the game
