= Jim Tatum =

American football and baseball player; coach

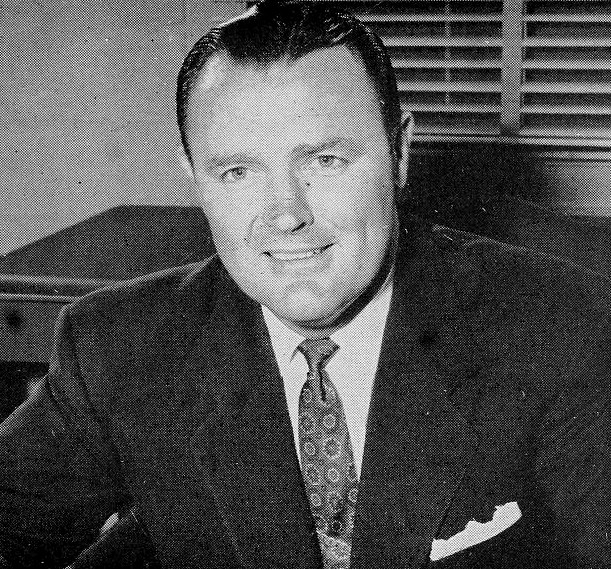

Biographical details
- Born: August 22, 1913; McColl, South Carolina, U.S.
- Died: July 23, 1959 (aged 45); Chapel Hill, North Carolina, U.S.

Playing career

Football
- 1933–1935: North Carolina

Baseball
- 1934–1936: North Carolina
- 1937: Tarboro Serpents
- 1938–1939: Snow Hill Billies
- Positions: Tackle (football); Catcher (baseball)

Coaching career (HC unless noted)

Football
- 1936–1938: Cornell (assistant)
- 1939–1941: North Carolina (assistant)
- 1942: North Carolina
- 1943: Iowa Pre-Flight (assistant)
- 1945: Jacksonville NAS
- 1946: Oklahoma
- 1947–1955: Maryland
- 1956–1958: North Carolina

Baseball
- 1937–1939: Cornell

Administrative career (AD unless noted)
- 1948–1956: Maryland

Head coaching record
- Overall: 109–37–7 (football) (Note: North Carolina later forfeited two wins during the 1956 season, victories over conference opponents Maryland and Virginia, because of an ineligible player. The NCAA and North Carolina still credit Tatum with those wins.); 20–40–1 (baseball)
- Bowls: 4–2

Accomplishments and honors

Championships
- Football; 1 National (1953) Big Six (1946); 1 SoCon (1951); 2 ACC (1953, 1955)

Awards
- Football; AFCA Coach of the Year (1953); 2× ACC Coach of the Year (1953, 1955); First-team All-SoCon (1934); Second-team All-SoCon (1933)
- College Football Hall of Fame; Inducted in 1984 (profile)

James Moore "Big Jim" Tatum (August 22, 1913 – July 23, 1959) was an American college football and college baseball player and coach. Tatum served as the head football coach at the University of North Carolina at Chapel Hill (1942, 1956–1958), the University of Oklahoma (1946), and the University of Maryland, College Park (1947–1955), compiling a career college football head coaching record of 100–35–7. His 1953 Maryland team won a national title. As a head coach, he employed the split-T formation with great success, a system he had learned as an assistant under Don Faurot at the Iowa Pre-Flight School during World War II. Tatum was also the head baseball coach at Cornell University from 1937 to 1939, tallying a mark of 20–40–1. Tatum's career was cut short by his untimely death in 1959. He was inducted into the College Football Hall of Fame as a coach in 1984.

== Early life and college playing career ==
Tatum was born in McColl, South Carolina, on July 22, 1913. He attended the University of North Carolina at Chapel Hill, where he played college football as a tackle under head coach Carl Snavely. Tatum was named to the All-Southern Conference team as a senior in 1935.

Tatum played minor league baseball as a catcher for the Kinston Eagles. The 6 feet, 3 inches and 230 pounds Tatum had the nicknames "Big Jim" and "Sunny Jim".

In September 1935, Tatum participated in training camp with the New York Giants of the National Football League at Blue Hill Country Club.

== Coaching career ==
=== Cornell ===
In 1936, Tatum followed his football coach at North Carolina, Carl Snavely, to Cornell University where he became Snavely's assistant football coach and also the head baseball coach for three seasons before returning to North Carolina in 1939. During this time, Tatum played minor league baseball in the class "D" Coastal Plain League with the Tarboro Serpents in 1937 and the Snow Hill Billies in 1938 and 1939.

=== Military service ===
Tatum enlisted in the United States Navy after one season as the head coach at North Carolina following Raymond Wolf's departure for naval service in 1941. He was assigned to the Iowa Pre-Flight school where he was an assistant coach for Don Faurot, the Missouri Tigers head coach and the inventor of the Split-T offense. Tatum used this offensive scheme with great success throughout his later career.

=== Oklahoma ===
After World War II, Tatum accepted a position as the head coach at the University of Oklahoma. He compiled an 8–3 in 1946 record before accepting the head coaching position at the University of Maryland. Bud Wilkinson, a fellow assistant coach at the Iowa Pre-Flight School, was one of his assistants at Oklahoma and was promoted to head coach when Tatum left for Maryland.

According to author Jim Dent, "Recruits who visited [Oklahoma's] campus were led into Tatum's office, where the coach was normally found sitting in his underwear, smoking a cigar. As the player took a seat across the desk, Tatum would open a deep desk drawer and say, 'feast your eyeballs on this, big fella.' Mountains of large bills caused eyes to pop. The slush fund, which amounted to $125,000, had been raised during the war years."

=== Maryland ===
At Maryland, Tatum compiled a 73–15–4 record for an .815 winning percentage. Maryland was undefeated in the 1951 season at 10–0, upsetting the top-ranked Tennessee Volunteers in the 1952 Sugar Bowl, 28–13. Tatum's 1953 team won a national championship. That season, Tatum was voted AFCA Coach of the Year. His Maryland teams won conference co-championships in 1951 in the Southern Conference and in 1953 and 1955 in the Atlantic Coast Conference. In addition to playing in the Sugar Bowl, Maryland also played twice each in the Gator Bowl and the Orange Bowl during Tatum's tenure.

=== North Carolina ===
In 1942 and from 1956 to 1958, Tatum served as the head football coach at his alma mater, the University of North Carolina. There he compiled a 19–17–3 record; two 1956 wins were later forfeited for use of an ineligible player. Tatum had originally returned to North Carolina to coach the freshmen football team in 1939 after spending time as an assistant at Cornell University. His first stint is notable for his recruitment of Felix "Doc" Blanchard, a son of one of his cousins, who played on the freshman team before enlisting and later starring as "Mr. Inside" for Army. He left his first tenure as head coach after the 1942 season to enlist in the Navy during World War II. His second tenure at North Carolina was cut short due to his untimely death.

Tatum was approached to coach at Indiana in 1957 but declined at the last minute.

Tatum died on July 23, 1959, in Chapel Hill, North Carolina, at the age of 46. He had contracted an infection on July 13, and entered the hospital on July 18. On the day of his death, he fell into a coma in the afternoon and never regained consciousness. He was declared dead at 11:40 p.m. His ailment was later determined to be a rickettsial disease "similar to typhus and Rocky Mountain spotted fever". He was buried in Old Chapel Hill Cemetery.

== Legacy ==
Himself a pupil of split T innovator Don Faurot, Tatum's coaching tree included the following assistants who later held head coaching positions of their own:

- George Barclay, North Carolina
- Walter Driskill, Baltimore Colts
- Warren Giese, South Carolina
- Jack Hennemier, Calgary Stampeders
- Jim Hickey, North Carolina
- Bill Meek, Houston
- Tommy Mont, Maryland
- Bob Ward, Maryland
- Bud Wilkinson, Oklahoma

A number of Tatum's players also went on to become head coaches:

- Dee Andros, Oregon State and Idaho
- Dick Bielski, Washington Federals
- John Idzik, Detroit
- Jim LaRue, Arizona
- Dick Modzelewski, Cleveland Browns
- Dick Nolan, San Francisco 49ers and New Orleans Saints
- Jim Owens, Washington
- Darrell Royal, Texas
- Wade Walker, Mississippi State
- Ron Waller, San Diego Chargers
- Bob Ward, Maryland

Nearly every year since 1979, the Atlantic Coast Conference has awarded the Jim Tatum Award to the conference's football player who most exemplifies Tatum's strong belief in the concept of the student-athlete.

== Head coaching record ==
=== College football ===
Year	Team	Overall	Conference	Standing	Bowl/playoffs	Coaches^{#}	AP^{°}
North Carolina Tar Heels (Southern Conference) (1942)
1942	North Carolina	5–2–2	3–1–1	T–4th			
Jacksonville Naval Air Station Fliers (Independent) (1945)
1945	Jacksonville NAS	9–2					
Jacksonville NAS:		9–2					
Oklahoma Sooners (Big Six Conference) (1946)
1946	Oklahoma	8–3	4–1	T–1st	W Gator		14
Oklahoma:		8–3	4–1				
Maryland Terrapins (Southern Conference) (1947–1952)
1947	Maryland	7–2–2	3–2–1	T–6th	T Gator		
1948	Maryland	6–4	4–2	6th			
1949	Maryland	9–1	4–0	2nd	W Gator		14
1950	Maryland	7–2–1	4–1–1	5th			
1951	Maryland	10–0	5–0	T–1st	W Sugar	4	3
1952	Maryland	7–2	0–0 (Note: The Southern Conference sanctioned Maryland during the 1952 season for accepting a bowl bid the previous season. The Terrapins were disallowed from playing any conference opponents.)			13	13
Maryland Terrapins (Atlantic Coast Conference) (1953–1955)
1953	Maryland	10–1	3–0	T–1st	L Orange	1	1
1954	Maryland	7–2–1	4–0–1	2nd		11	8
1955	Maryland	10–1	4–0	T–1st	L Orange	3	3
Maryland:		73–15–4	4–1				
North Carolina Tar Heels (Atlantic Coast Conference) (1956–1958)
1956	North Carolina	2–7–1	2–3–1	5th			
1957	North Carolina	6–4	4–3	T–3rd			
1958	North Carolina	6–4	4–3	4th			
North Carolina:		19–17–3	13–10–2				
Total:		109–37–7					
National championship Conference title Conference division title or championship game berth
^{#}Rankings from final Coaches Poll.; ^{°}Rankings from final AP Poll.

=== College baseball ===
Record table
Season	Team	Overall	Conference	Standing	Postseason
Cornell Big Red (Eastern Intercollegiate Baseball League) (1937–1939)
1937	Cornell	4–15	2–9		
1938	Cornell	6–14	5–7		
1939	Cornell	10–11–1	9–3	T–1st	
Cornell:		20–40–1 (.336)	16–19 (.457)		
Total:		20–40–1 (.336)			
National champion Postseason invitational champion Conference regular season champion Conference regular season and conference tournament champion Division regular season champion Division regular season and conference tournament champion Conference tournament champion
