= 1958 Richmond Spiders football team =

American college football season

1958 Richmond Spiders football
- Conference: Southern Conference
- Record: 3–7 (3–4 SoCon)
- Head coach: Ed Merrick (8th season)
- Captain: Joe Biscaha
- Home stadium: City Stadium

1958 Southern Conference football standings
	Conf.					Overall
Team	W		L		T	W		L		T
West Virginia $	4	–	0	–	0	4	–	5	–	1
VPI	3	–	1	–	0	5	–	4	–	1
George Washington	3	–	2	–	0	3	–	5	–	0
VMI	2	–	2	–	1	6	–	2	–	2
Richmond	3	–	4	–	0	3	–	7	–	0
The Citadel	2	–	3	–	0	4	–	6	–	0
Davidson	2	–	3	–	0	5	–	4	–	0
Furman	1	–	2	–	0	2	–	7	–	0
William & Mary	1	–	4	–	1	2	–	6	–	1
$ – Conference champion

The 1958 Richmond Spiders football team was an American football team that represented the University of Richmond as a member of the Southern Conference (SoCon) during the 1958 college football season. In their eighth season under head coach Ed Merrick, Richmond compiled a 3–7 record, with a mark of 3–4 in conference play, finishing in fifth place in the SoCon.

== Schedule ==
Date	Opponent	Site	Result	Attendance	Source
September 20	at West Virginia	Mountaineer Field; Morgantown, WV	L 22–66	20,000	
September 27	at Dayton*	UD Stadium; Dayton, OH	L 12–13		
October 4	at VMI	Alumni Field; Lexington, VA (rivalry)	L 6–12		
October 11	at Rutgers*	Rutgers Stadium; Piscataway, NJ	L 12–23	10,000	
October 17	at George Washington	Griffith Stadium; Washington, DC	W 26–2	3,500	
October 25	at Villanova*	Villanova Stadium; Villanova, PA	L 6–13	6,327	
November 1	The Citadel	City Stadium; Richmond, VA	W 20–0	4,500	
November 8	at VPI	Miles Stadium; Blacksburg, VA	L 23–27	6,000	
November 15	at Davidson	Richardson Stadium; Davidson, NC	W 27–22		
November 27	William & Mary	City Stadium; Richmond, VA (rivalry)	L 15–18	9,000	
*Non-conference game
