= 1958 North Carolina Tar Heels football team =

American college football season

1958 North Carolina Tar Heels football
- Conference: Atlantic Coast Conference
- Record: 6–4 (4–3 ACC)
- Head coach: Jim Tatum (4th season)
- Captains: Phil Blazer; Curtis Hathaway
- Home stadium: Kenan Memorial Stadium

1958 Atlantic Coast Conference football standings
| | Conf. | | | | | Overall |
| Team | W | | L | | T | W | | L | | T |
|---|---|---|---|---|---|---|---|---|---|---|
| No. 12 Clemson $ | 5 | – | 1 | – | 0 | 8 | – | 3 | – | 0 |
| No. 15 South Carolina | 5 | – | 2 | – | 0 | 7 | – | 3 | – | 0 |
| Duke | 3 | – | 2 | – | 0 | 5 | – | 5 | – | 0 |
| North Carolina | 4 | – | 3 | – | 0 | 6 | – | 4 | – | 0 |
| Maryland | 3 | – | 3 | – | 0 | 4 | – | 6 | – | 0 |
| Wake Forest | 2 | – | 4 | – | 0 | 3 | – | 7 | – | 0 |
| NC State | 2 | – | 5 | – | 0 | 2 | – | 7 | – | 1 |
| Virginia | 1 | – | 5 | – | 0 | 1 | – | 9 | – | 0 |
$ – Conference champion; Rankings from AP poll

The 1958 North Carolina Tar Heels football team represented the University of North Carolina at Chapel Hill during the 1958 college football season. The Tar Heels were led by fourth-year head coach Jim Tatum and played their home games at Kenan Memorial Stadium. The team competed as a member of the Atlantic Coast Conference, finishing in fourth.

Two-way end Al Goldstein was named a first-team All-American by the Football Writers Association of America and the NEA.

This was Tatum's last year as head coach, as he unexpectedly died at age 46 of a typhus-like illness in July 1959. He had a record of 19–17–3 at UNC.

== Schedule ==
| Date | Time | Opponent | Rank | Site | Result | Attendance | Source |
|---|---|---|---|---|---|---|---|
| September 20 | 2:00 p.m. | NC State | No. 10 | Kenan Memorial Stadium; Chapel Hill, NC (rivalry) | L 14–21 | 41,000 | |
| September 27 | 2:00 p.m. | at Clemson | | Memorial Stadium; Clemson, SC | L 21–26 | 40,000 | |
| October 3 | 11:15 p.m. | at USC* | | Los Angeles Memorial Coliseum; Los Angeles, CA | W 8–7 | 43,238 | |
| October 11 | 2:00 p.m. | South Carolina | | Kenan Memorial Stadium; Chapel Hill, NC (rivalry) | W 6–0 | 26,000 | |
| October 18 | 2:00 p.m. | Maryland^{†} | | Kenan Memorial Stadium; Chapel Hill, NC | W 27–0 | 25,000 | |
| October 25 | 2:00 p.m. | Wake Forest | | Kenan Memorial Stadium; Chapel Hill, NC (rivalry) | W 26–7 | 33,000 | |
| November 1 | 2:00 p.m. | at Tennessee* | No. 17 | Shields–Watkins Field; Knoxville, TN | W 21–7 | 25,290 | |
| November 8 | 1:30 p.m. | at Virginia | No. 15 | Scott Stadium; Charlottesville, VA (South's Oldest Rivalry) | W 42–0 | 18,000 | |
| November 15 | 2:00 p.m. | at Notre Dame* | No. 11 | Notre Dame Stadium; Notre Dame, IN (rivalry) | L 24–34 | 56,839 | |
| November 22 | 2:00 p.m. | Duke | No. 17 | Kenan Memorial Stadium; Chapel Hill, NC (Victory Bell) | L 6–7 | 44,500 | |
*Non-conference game; ^{†}Homecoming; Rankings from AP Poll released prior to the game; All times are in Eastern time
