= 1958 Wake Forest Demon Deacons football team =

American college football season

1958 Wake Forest Demon Deacons football
- Conference: Atlantic Coast Conference
- Record: 3–7 (2–4 ACC)
- Head coach: Paul Amen (3rd season)
- Captains: Frank Thompson; Charlie Carpenter
- Home stadium: Bowman Gray Stadium

1958 Atlantic Coast Conference football standings
	Conf.					Overall
Team	W		L		T	W		L		T
No. 12 Clemson $	5	–	1	–	0	8	–	3	–	0
No. 15 South Carolina	5	–	2	–	0	7	–	3	–	0
Duke	3	–	2	–	0	5	–	5	–	0
North Carolina	4	–	3	–	0	6	–	4	–	0
Maryland	3	–	3	–	0	4	–	6	–	0
Wake Forest	2	–	4	–	0	3	–	7	–	0
NC State	2	–	5	–	0	2	–	7	–	1
Virginia	1	–	5	–	0	1	–	9	–	0
$ – Conference champion; Rankings from AP poll

The 1958 Wake Forest Demon Deacons football team was an American football team that represented Wake Forest University during the 1958 college football season. In their third season under head coach Paul Amen, the Demon Deacons compiled a 3–7 record and finished in sixth place in the Atlantic Coast Conference.

== Schedule ==
Date	Opponent	Site	Result	Attendance	Source
September 20	Maryland	Bowman Gray Stadium; Winston-Salem, NC	W 34–0	8,000	
September 27	vs. VPI	Foreman Field; Norfolk, VA	W 13–6	7,000	
October 4	at Florida State*	Doak Campbell Stadium; Tallahassee, FL	L 24–27	19,700	
October 11	NC State	Bowman Gray Stadium; Winston-Salem, NC (rivalry)	W 13–7	18,500	
October 18	at Villanova*	Villanova Stadium; Villanova, PA	L 7–14	11,439	
October 25	at North Carolina	Kenan Memorial Stadium; Chapel Hill, NC (rivalry)	L 7–26	33,000	
November 1	at No. 19 Clemson	Memorial Stadium; Clemson, SC	L 12–14	26,000	
November 15	Duke	Bowman Gray Stadium; Winston-Salem, NC (rivalry)	L 0–29	20,000	
November 22	at No. 2 Auburn*	Cliff Hare Stadium; Auburn, AL	L 7–21	20,000	
November 27	at No. 16 South Carolina	Carolina Stadium; Columbia, SC	L 7–24	16,000	
*Non-conference game; Rankings from AP Poll released prior to the game

== Team leaders ==
Category	Team Leader	Att/Cth	Yds
Passing	Norm Snead	67/151	1,003
Rushing	Neil MacLean	139	624
Receiving	Pete Manning	25	307
