= 1958 Furman Purple Hurricane football team =

American college football season

1958 Furman Purple Hurricane football
- Conference: Southern Conference
- Record: 2–7 (1–2 SoCon)
- Head coach: Bob King (1st season)
- Captain: Buddy Walton
- Home stadium: Sirrine Stadium

1958 Southern Conference football standings
	Conf.					Overall
Team	W		L		T	W		L		T
West Virginia $	4	–	0	–	0	4	–	5	–	1
VPI	3	–	1	–	0	5	–	4	–	1
George Washington	3	–	2	–	0	3	–	5	–	0
VMI	2	–	2	–	1	6	–	2	–	2
Richmond	3	–	4	–	0	3	–	7	–	0
The Citadel	2	–	3	–	0	4	–	6	–	0
Davidson	2	–	3	–	0	5	–	4	–	0
Furman	1	–	2	–	0	2	–	7	–	0
William & Mary	1	–	4	–	1	2	–	6	–	1
$ – Conference champion

The 1958 Furman Purple Hurricane football team was an American football team that represented Furman University as a member of the Southern Conference (SoCon) during the 1958 college football season. In their first season under head coach Bob King, Furman compiled an overall record of 2–7 with a mark of 1–2 in conference play, placing eighth in the SoCon.

== Schedule ==
Date	Opponent	Site	Result	Attendance	Source
September 20	at Florida State*	Doak Campbell Stadium; Tallahassee, FL	L 6–42	15,000	
October 3	at George Washington	Griffith Stadium; Washington, DC	L 8–11	4,500	
October 11	at Alabama*	Denny Stadium; Tuscaloosa, AL	L 6–29	17,000	
October 18	Wofford*	Sirrine Stadium; Greenville, SC (rivalry)	W 40–39	9,000	
October 25	The Citadel	Sirrine Stadium; Greenville, SC (rivalry)	L 6–24	8,000	
November 1	at Penn State*	New Beaver Field; University Park, PA	L 0–36	23,000	
November 8	South Carolina*	Sirrine Stadium; Greenville, SC	L 7–32		
November 22	at Davidson	American Legion Memorial Stadium; Charlotte, NC	W 22–20	3,500	
November 29	at No. 12 Clemson*	Memorial Stadium; Clemson, SC	L 19–36	16,000	
*Non-conference game; Rankings from AP Poll released prior to the game
