= 1958 VMI Keydets football team =

American college football season

1958 VMI Keydets football
- Conference: Southern Conference
- Record: 6–2–2 (2–2–1 SoCon)
- Head coach: John McKenna (6th season)
- Home stadium: Alumni Field

1958 Southern Conference football standings
	Conf.					Overall
Team	W		L		T	W		L		T
West Virginia $	4	–	0	–	0	4	–	5	–	1
VPI	3	–	1	–	0	5	–	4	–	1
George Washington	3	–	2	–	0	3	–	5	–	0
VMI	2	–	2	–	1	6	–	2	–	2
Richmond	3	–	4	–	0	3	–	7	–	0
The Citadel	2	–	3	–	0	4	–	6	–	0
Davidson	2	–	3	–	0	5	–	4	–	0
Furman	1	–	2	–	0	2	–	7	–	0
William & Mary	1	–	4	–	1	2	–	6	–	1
$ – Conference champion

The 1958 VMI Keydets football team was an American football team that represented the Virginia Military Institute (VMI) as a member of the Southern Conference (SoCon) during the 1958 college football season. Led by sixth-year head coach John McKenna, the Keydets compiled an overall record of 6–2–2 with a mark of 2–2–1 in conference play, placing fourth in the SoCon.

== Schedule ==
Date	Opponent	Site	Result	Attendance	Source
September 20	Morehead State*	Alumni Field; Lexington, VA	W 46–20		
September 27	at Villanova*	Villanova Stadium; Villanova, PA	W 33–6	6,800	
October 4	Richmond	Alumni Field; Lexington, VA	W 12–6		
October 11	vs. William & Mary	Mitchell Stadium; Bluefield, WV (rivalry)	T 6–6	5,000	
October 18	at Tampa*	Phillips Field; Tampa, FL	W 13–12	5,000	
October 25	at Davidson	Richardson Stadium; Davidson, NC	W 42–7	7,500	
November 1	vs. Virginia*	Foreman Field; Norfolk, VA	W 33–0	15,000	
November 8	Lehigh	City Stadium; Lynchburg, VA	T 7–7	6,000	
November 15	at The Citadel	Johnson Hagood Stadium; Charleston, SC (rivalry)	L 6–14	12,000	
November 27	vs. VPI	Victory Stadium; Roanoke, VA (rivalry)	L 16–21	27,500	
*Non-conference game

== Roster ==
- Art Brandiff halfback
- John Engels halfback
- Dick Evans end
- Sam Horner halfback
- Pete Johnson fullback
- Carl Kasko end
- Bill Nebraska quarterback
