= 1958 VPI Gobblers football team =

American college football season

1958 VPI Gobblers football
- Conference: Southern Conference
- Record: 5–4–1 (3–1 SoCon)
- Head coach: Frank Moseley (8th season)
- Home stadium: Miles Stadium

1958 Southern Conference football standings
	Conf.					Overall
Team	W		L		T	W		L		T
West Virginia $	4	–	0	–	0	4	–	5	–	1
VPI	3	–	1	–	0	5	–	4	–	1
George Washington	3	–	2	–	0	3	–	5	–	0
VMI	2	–	2	–	1	6	–	2	–	2
Richmond	3	–	4	–	0	3	–	7	–	0
The Citadel	2	–	3	–	0	4	–	6	–	0
Davidson	2	–	3	–	0	5	–	4	–	0
Furman	1	–	2	–	0	2	–	7	–	0
William & Mary	1	–	4	–	1	2	–	6	–	1
$ – Conference champion

The 1958 VPI Gobblers football team represented the Virginia Polytechnic Institute or VPI (now known as Virginia Polytechnic Institute and State University or Virginia Tech) as a member of the Southern Conference (SoCon) during the 1958 college football season. Led by eighth-year head coach Frank Moseley the Gobblers compiled an overall record of 5–4–1 with a mark of 3–1 in conference play, and finished second in the SoCon. VPI played home games at Miles Stadium in Blacksburg, Virginia.

== Schedule ==
Date	Time	Opponent	Site	Result	Attendance	Source
September 20	8:00 p.m.	vs. West Texas State*	Victory Stadium; Roanoke, VA	W 28–12	7,500–9,000	
September 27		vs. Wake Forest*	Foreman Field; Norfolk, VA	L 6–13	7,000	
October 4		William & Mary^{†}	Miles Stadium; Blacksburg, VA	W 27–15	15,000	
October 11		vs. Virginia*	Victory Stadium; Roanoke, VA (Harvest Bowl, rivalry)	W 22–13	26,000	
October 18		at Florida State*	Doak Campbell Stadium; Tallahassee, FL	L 0–28	8,000	
October 25		vs. West Virginia	City Stadium; Richmond, VA (Tobacco Bowl, rivalry)	L 20–21	22,000	
November 1		at NC State*	Riddick Stadium; Raleigh, NC	T 14–14	13,000	
November 8		Richmond	Miles Stadium; Blacksburg, VA	W 27–23	6,000	
November 15		at No. 1 Mississippi Southern*	Faulkner Field; Hattiesburg, MS	L 0–41	11,000	
November 27		vs. VMI	Victory Stadium; Roanoke, VA (rivalry)	W 21–16	27,500	
*Non-conference game; ^{†}Homecoming; Rankings from UPI Poll released prior to the game; All times are in Eastern time

== Roster ==
The following players were members of the 1958 football team according to the roster published in the 1959 edition of The Bugle, the Virginia Tech yearbook.

VPI 1958 roster
Clyde Barnette; Edwin M. Bartrug, Jr.; Tom Betz; Ed Brinkley; James Alexander Burks (Capt.); Kenneth Arnold Byrd; William C. Cranwell; Carroll Dale; Bloice Davison; Jim Farr; Bob Harris; Pat Henry	Billy Holsclaw; William Duncan Holsclaw, Jr.; Ben Hunter; Harold Jones; Warren Maccaroni; Nicholas M. Mihalas; David Mitchell; Joe Moss; Thomas Ellis O'Brien; Don Oakes; Art Pruett; William Alger Pugh	Dick Ringer; Sam Shaffer; Dickie Snead; Charlie Speck; Chuck Stephens; Amos Leon Tomblin; Gil Turnage; Donald Ray Vaught; Bernie Vishneski; Johnny Watkins; Jay N. Whitesell; Arthur Allen Whittier; Mike Zeno
