= 1958 NC State Wolfpack football team =

American college football season

1958 NC State Wolfpack football
- Conference: Atlantic Coast Conference
- Record: 2–7–1 (2–5 ACC)
- Head coach: Earle Edwards (5th season)
- Home stadium: Riddick Stadium

1958 Atlantic Coast Conference football standings
	Conf.					Overall
Team	W		L		T	W		L		T
No. 12 Clemson $	5	–	1	–	0	8	–	3	–	0
No. 15 South Carolina	5	–	2	–	0	7	–	3	–	0
Duke	3	–	2	–	0	5	–	5	–	0
North Carolina	4	–	3	–	0	6	–	4	–	0
Maryland	3	–	3	–	0	4	–	6	–	0
Wake Forest	2	–	4	–	0	3	–	7	–	0
NC State	2	–	5	–	0	2	–	7	–	1
Virginia	1	–	5	–	0	1	–	9	–	0
$ – Conference champion; Rankings from AP poll

The 1958 NC State Wolfpack football team represented North Carolina State University during the 1958 college football season. The Wolfpack were led by fifth-year head coach Earle Edwards and played their home games at Riddick Stadium in Raleigh, North Carolina. They competed as members of the Atlantic Coast Conference, finishing in seventh.

== Schedule ==
Date	Opponent	Site	Result	Attendance	Source
September 20	at No. 10 North Carolina	Kenan Memorial Stadium; Chapel Hill, NC (rivalry)	W 21–14	41,000	
September 27	Maryland	Riddick Stadium; Raleigh, NC	L 6–21	11,000	
October 4	at Virginia	Scott Stadium; Charlottesville, VA	W 26–14	16,000	
October 11	at Wake Forest	Bowman Gray Stadium; Winston-Salem, NC (rivalry)	L 7–13	18,500	
October 18	at William & Mary*	Cary Field; Williamsburg, VA	L 6–13		
October 25	at Duke	Duke Stadium; Durham, NC (rivalry)	L 13–20	20,000	
November 1	VPI*	Riddick Stadium; Raleigh, NC	T 14–14	13,000	
November 8	at No. 1 (small) Mississippi Southern*	Ladd Stadium; Mobile, AL	L 14–26	18,987	
November 15	Clemson	Riddick Stadium; Raleigh, NC (rivalry)	L 6–13	12,000	
November 22	at South Carolina	Carolina Stadium; Columbia, SC	L 7–12		
*Non-conference game; Rankings from AP Poll released prior to the game
