= Tommy Mont =

American football coach (1922–2012)

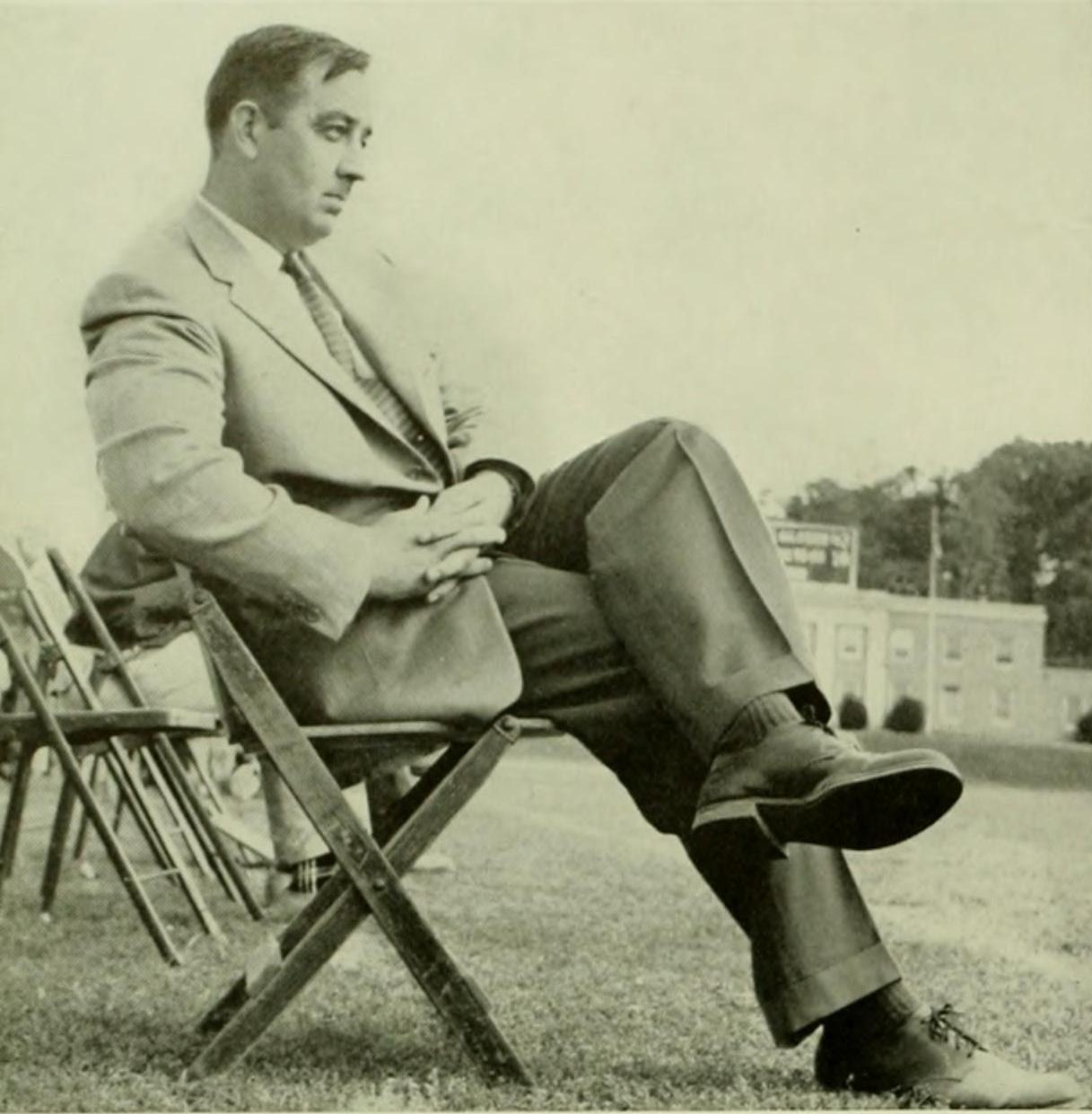
- Mont as Maryland head coach in 1957

Biographical details
- Born: June 20, 1922; Mount Savage, Maryland, U.S.
- Died: January 1, 2012 (aged 89); Phoenix, Arizona, U.S.

Playing career
- 1941–1942: Maryland
- 1946: Maryland
- 1947: Wilmington Clippers
- 1947–1949: Washington Redskins
- Position: Quarterback

Coaching career (HC unless noted)
- 1949: Chattanooga (assistant)
- 1950: Washington Redskins (assistant)
- 1951–1955: Maryland (backfield)
- 1956–1958: Maryland
- 1959–1976: DePauw

Administrative career (AD unless noted)
- 1972–1987: DePauw

Head coaching record
- Overall: 78–112–5

Accomplishments and honors

Awards
- 2× ICC Coach of the Year (1967, 19??); Second-team All-SoCon (1942)

Thomas Allison Mont (June 20, 1922 – January 1, 2012) was an American educator, university administrator, college football coach, and National Football League (NFL) player. He played quarterback for the Washington Redskins as a back-up behind Sammy Baugh for three seasons. Mont served as the head football coach for three years at the University of Maryland and eighteen years at DePauw University. He also served as the DePauw athletic director for fifteen years.

== Early life ==
Mont was born in Mount Savage, Maryland in 1922. He attended Allegany High School in Cumberland, Maryland, where he played football as a quarterback. In 1939, he led the team to the city championship.

=== College career ===
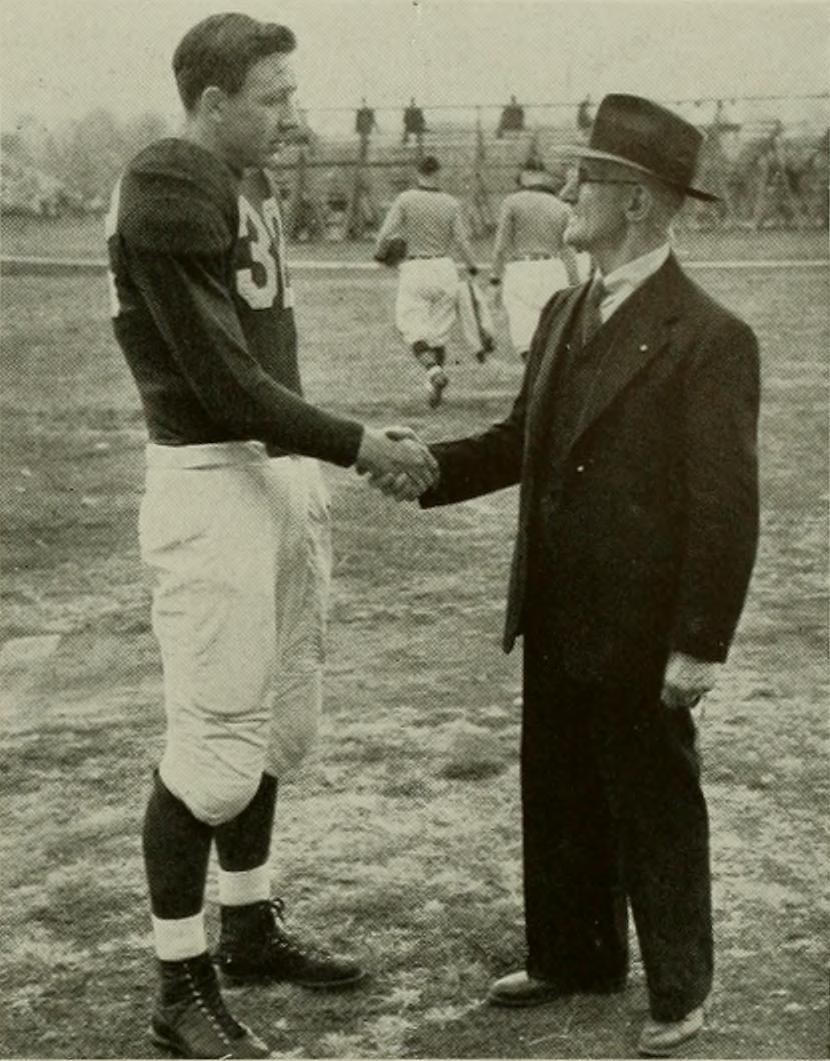
Mont meets William W. Skinner, Maryland's first quarterback and coach of the 1892 team.

Mont attended the University of Maryland where he played football as a quarterback in 1941 and 1942. In 1942, Clark Shaughnessy took over as Maryland head coach. In 1940 and 1941, Shaughnessy had coached at Stanford. There he installed a pass-oriented version of the T-formation and, in his first year, engineered a turnaround from a 1–7–1 record to a perfect 10–0 season and Pacific Coast Conference championship. While Maryland's head coach, Shaughnessy also worked concurrently as an advisor for the Washington Redskins, with that club and Maryland sharing the cost of his salary. Shaughnessy helped develop Mont into a high-quality quarterback. In 1942, with Mont under center, the Terrapins posted a 7–2 record. That year, Mont was named an honorable mention All-American and ranked as the number-three passer in the nation. Mont also played lacrosse for Maryland for the 1942 season.

=== Military service ===
Mont put his college career on hold to join the United States Army as an infantryman and served in the Second World War. In 1945, he coached the 3rd Infantry Division football team which won the 7th Army championship. After returning to the United States, he coached the basketball and football teams at Fort Benning, Georgia.

=== Return to college ===
After his military service, Mont returned to Maryland and played football for another season in 1946. That season, Shaughnessy, a one-time Maryland head coach in 1942, also returned from Pittsburgh. Shaughnessy again worked part-time as an advisor for the Washington Redskins, and he had some of the Maryland players assist him. Under the arrangement, Mont and Vic Turyn reportedly even called some plays for the Redskins. Mont graduated from Maryland with a Bachelor of Science degree in 1947. He played a second season on the lacrosse team in 1948.

== Professional playing career ==
Mont had been selected in the 12th round of the 1944 NFL draft (114th overall) by the New York Giants. In 1947, he went to play for the Washington Redskins. He played as a back-up quarterback for three seasons, and at one point was the number-two behind the legendary Sammy Baugh. In his first season, he saw action in four games and recorded one interception on defense with a seven-yard return.

In 1948, he played in 11 games including two starts. He recorded 12 completions on 28 attempts for 157 yards and two touchdowns and two interceptions. He also had 11 carries for 103 yards and one touchdown. On defense, he had two interceptions for 21 yards. That season, he was the Redskins' second-leading passer behind Baugh.

In 1949, he played in 12 games and made three of seven completions for 44 yards. He also recorded rushed 14 times for 75 yards and made eight receptions for 105 yards and two touchdowns. On defense, he recovered one fumble for a 45-yard return. That season, he was the Redskins' third-leading passer behind Baugh and Harry Gilmer.

== Coaching career ==
=== Early positions ===
In 1949, Mont assisted at the University of Chattanooga, where he helped install a T-formation offense. In 1950, he served as an assistant coach with the Washington Redskins.

Mont returned to his alma mater in 1951 to become the Maryland backfield coach under Jim Tatum, and he held that position through the 1955 season. During that time, he also worked with the U.S. Marine Corps' Parris Island football team, where he helped implement a Split-T offense in 1954. Mont worked summers with the football team of the National Polytechnic Institute in Mexico City from 1953 to 1955. In 1955, he also worked for the Calgary Stampeders of the Canadian Football League. In December 1958, he was a coach for the Blue team in the Blue–Gray Football Classic.

=== Maryland ===
After Tatum resigned to coach at his alma mater, North Carolina, Mont was appointed as his replacement in 1956. In his first season, Maryland was riddled with injuries and posted a disappointing 2–7–1 record. Mont had great difficulty recruiting to the same standard that his predecessor had, but managed to secure Rod Breedlove, a highly touted guard prospect. Breedlove later went on to play eight years in the NFL and made a Pro Bowl appearance.

In 1957, the Terrapins improved to a 5–5 record. The highlight of the season was a game featuring Jim Tatum's return to College Park, Maryland. On October 19, at Byrd Stadium, Maryland met the North Carolina team led by their former head coach. The game also had in attendance Queen Elizabeth II, who had expressed a wish to see her first game of American football. The Tar Heels were ranked 6th in the nation and possessed a 3–1 record. The Terrapins, on the other hand, were 1–3. In the first quarter, Maryland halfback Howard Dare fumbled and North Carolina linebacker Jack Lineberger recovered the ball on the Terrapins' 44-yard line. North Carolina was subsequently forced to punt but recovered it at the Maryland 35. On the ensuing possession, Tar Heel halfback Daley Goff rushed 11 yards for a touchdown. In the third quarter, Maryland gained excellent field position when Goff received a bad punt snap and the Terps took over on the Carolina 38-yard line. Maryland quarterback Bob Rusevlyan later scored on a one-yard sneak. In the fourth quarter, halfback Ted Kershner broke away for an 81-yard touchdown run. Fullback Jim Joyce capped a 67-yard drive with a 13-yard rush for a score. With a final result of 21–7, the Maryland players carried Mont to the Queen and Prince Philip's box. Mont said it was a day that "I will revel in for the rest of my life."

In 1958, however, Maryland again backslid with a 4–6 record and Mont subsequently resigned.

=== DePauw ===
In 1959, Mont accepted a job as head coach and a professor of physical education at DePauw University. While there, he compiled a 67–94–4 record. In the rivalry with Wabash College, the Monon Bell Classic, Mont's teams posted a 12–5–1 record. He was twice bestowed most outstanding conference coach honors, including in 1967, when he was named the Indiana Collegiate Conference Coach of the Year.

In 1964, Mont earned a Master of Science degree from Indiana University. In 1973, he was inducted into the Maryland Sports Hall of Fame at the Hit and Run Club at Memorial Stadium in Baltimore.

== After football ==
In 1972, he was appointed as the DePauw athletic director and the chairman of the department of physical education. In 1977, Mont retired as head coach to devote his full energy to his duties as athletic director. In 1987, he retired as athletic director. He and his wife were living in Phoenix, Arizona during his later years. Mont died of heart failure on New Year's Day, 2012, aged 89.

== Head coaching record ==
Year	Team	Overall	Conference	Standing	Bowl/playoffs
Maryland Terrapins (Atlantic Coast Conference) (1956–1958)
1956	Maryland	2–7–1	2–3–1	4th	
1957	Maryland	5–5	4–3	3rd	
1958	Maryland	4–6	3–3	5th	
Maryland:		11–18–1	9–8–1		
DePauw Tigers (Indiana Collegiate Conference) (1959–1976)
1959	DePauw	1–7–1	1–5	T–6th	
1960	DePauw	3–5–1	1–4–1	7th	
1961	DePauw	5–4	2–4	T–4th	
1962	DePauw	5–4	3–3	T–4th	
1963	DePauw	5–4	3–3	T–3rd	
1964	DePauw	2–7	1–5	6th	
1965	DePauw	2–6–1	1–4–1	7th	
1966	DePauw	3–6	1–5	T–6th	
1967	DePauw	6–2–1	4–1–1	2nd	
1968	DePauw	6–3	3–1	2nd	
1969	DePauw	2–7	1–3	T–4th	
1970	DePauw	4–5	0–4	5th	
1971	DePauw	1–8	0–4	7th	
1972	DePauw	2–7	1–4	7th	
1973	DePauw	6–3	3–2	T–2nd	
1974	DePauw	7–3	4–2	3rd	
1975	DePauw	5–5	2–4	T–4th	
1976	DePauw	2–8	0–5	6th	
DePauw:		67–94–4	31–63–3		
Total:		78–112–5			
