= Alex Hawkins =

American football player (1937–2017)

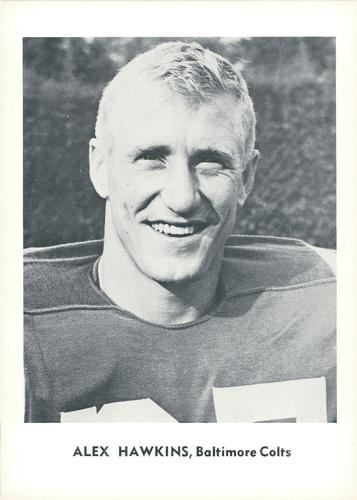

No. 25
- Position: Running back

Personal information
- Born: July 2, 1937; Welch, West Virginia, U.S.
- Died: September 12, 2017 (aged 80); Columbia, South Carolina, U.S.
- Listed height: 6 ft 0 in (1.83 m)
- Listed weight: 190 lb (86 kg)

Career information
- High school: South Charleston (South Charleston, West Virginia)
- College: South Carolina
- NFL draft: 1959: 2nd round, 13th overall pick

Career history
- Baltimore Colts (1959–1965); Atlanta Falcons (1966–1967); Baltimore Colts (1967-1968)

Awards and highlights
- 2× NFL champion (1959, 1968); Third-team All-American (1958); ACC Player of the Year (1958); First-team All-ACC (1958); 2× Second-team All-ACC (1956, 1957)

Career NFL statistics
- Rushing yards: 787
- Rushing average: 3.8
- Receptions: 129
- Receiving yards: 1,751
- Total touchdowns: 22
- Stats at Pro Football Reference

Clifton Alexander Hawkins (July 2, 1937 – September 12, 2017) was an American professional football player who played professionally as a running back in the National Football League (NFL) for the Baltimore Colts and Atlanta Falcons. He excelled as a special teams player and was a special teams co-captain with the Colts, the first special teams player with this distinction.

== Early life ==
Born in Welch, West Virginia in 1937 to Nathan and Lula Hawkins, Hawkins graduated from South Charleston High School in 1955. He was its first student to letter in four sports. He was the most valuable player, and a captain, in his West Virginia high school football All-Star game.

== College career ==
Hawkins received 23 college basketball scholarship offers, and five football scholarship offers including one from the University of South Carolina, where he ultimately attended college. From 1956–58, Hawkins played college football for the South Carolina Gamecocks. He played a wide range of positions, including every skill position on offense, defense, and special teams. In 1956, he led the team in receiving yards and in 1957 led them in passing yards. He played in the defensive secondary and at linebacker, leading the team in interceptions in 1956. He led the team in punt returns in 1957 and 1958, and in scoring every year he played. He also kicked 48 extra points.

Overall, he rushed for 1,491 yards, had 1,761 total rushing and receiving yards, and completed 61% of his passes for 413 yards. He was voted the Atlantic Coast Conference (ACC) Player of the Year in 1958 as a senior, and was a third-team All-American. He was inducted into the University of South Carolina's Hall of Fame in 1970.

== NFL career ==
The Green Bay Packers selected Hawkins as the thirteenth player overall in the 1959 NFL draft, in the second round, but he was released in mid-September by first-year head coach Vince Lombardi. The first four rounds of the draft were held in early December 1958, nearly two months before Lombardi was hired. Hawkins was picked up by Baltimore Colts, and they repeated as NFL champions his rookie season, defeating the New York Giants 31–16 in the title game in Baltimore.

Hawkins played seven years for the Colts, where he was beloved by the Baltimore fans, and was then selected in the expansion draft of 1966 by the newly created Atlanta Falcons. After the third game of his second year with the Falcons, he was traded back to the Colts, where he finished the final two years of his career. Hawkins originally played running back for the Colts, and later wide receiver, but was best known for his special teams play as a football player, at a time when special teams were known as the "suicide squad". He is believed to be the first special teams captain in NFL history.

Former NFL player and college headcoach Bill Curry, both an opponent and teammate of Hawkins, described him as a great special teams player and "a great locker room guy, great for morale...." Curry said Hawkins "'was the best open-field blocker I ever faced on special teams ...."

Hawkins was also well known for his antics off the field, which led to his quick trade back to the Colts by exasperated Atlanta coach Norb Hecker, among other colorful events during his career, such as sneaking out of his hotel rooms and gambling (though not on football). He was similarly known for amusing, self-deprecating or irreverent quips about his own behavior, such as that he would be the only NFL player to pay more in fines than he ever received in salary; or "'I have learned that there is absolutely no evidence whatsoever that sports builds character.'"

At the end of his college career, during the Senior Bowl, Hawkins' team was coached by Hall of Fame coach Paul Brown, whom Hawkins offended with one of his quips. Brown responded, "Hawkins, you're a dog, and you'll never make it in the NFL." In telling the story after his NFL career had ended, Hawkins said, "'Paul Brown is the first person to realize that, and I've admired him ever since.'"

In his final season in 1968, Hawkins was special-teams captain for the Colts in Super Bowl III, in which the heavily favored Colts were upset 16–7 by Joe Namath and the New York Jets on January 12, 1969. During the 1968 season, the Colts had a record of 13–1 under head coach Don Shula, although Hawkins' playing time was limited.

During a ten-year NFL career, Hawkins rushed for 10 touchdowns and 787 yards, and his 129 pass receptions included 12 touchdown passes. He also returned punts and kickoffs. He was the Associated Press Player of the Week in week 9 of the 1964 season. Hawkins received a game ball in October 1967 for catching the winning touchdown pass in a game against Washington. Befitting his reputation, two days later he was arrested for participating in illegal gambling but released; and then a few days later caught a touchdown pass in a game against the Packers.

In one version, Hawkins acquired the nickname "Captain Who" prior to a Baltimore Colts game with the Chicago Bears, when the team captains were being introduced to each other before the game. Bears' Hall of Fame linebacker Dick Butkus responded to the official's reference to "Captain Hawkins" by blurting out "Captain Who?" In another version of the story, told by Hawkins, it is a referee that says "Captain Who" when Hawkins is introduced to the referee as the Colts special teams captain, along with legendary offensive and defensive captains Johnny Unitas and Gino Marchetti.

== Broadcaster ==
After retiring as a player, Hawkins worked as a color commentator for Falcons radio, for TVS' Thursday night World Football League (WFL) telecasts and CBS' NFL telecasts throughout the 1970s.

=== 1977 NFC Championship Broadcast ===
In 1977, the NFC Championship Game between the Minnesota Vikings and the Dallas Cowboys was televised by CBS and covered by play-by-play announcer Vin Scully with the filter-free Hawkins as color commentator.

Hawkins said that he hoped that the Cowboys would win, because "I've always been a Cowboy fan."

Hawkins was arrested during a traffic stop a few days after the championship game, and later was fired by CBS.

Hawkins recalled being fired four times by television executive Bob Wussler (who had worked for CBS and was a founder of TBS) from various broadcast jobs: "'I've been fired four times by Bob Wussler. .... Why he persists in hiring me, I have no idea.'" Hawkins still was working on football analysis programs at TBS in 1980.

== Death ==
After battling dementia for several years, Hawkins died at HarborChase Assisted Living and Memory Care in Columbia, South Carolina on September 12, 2017, at the age of 80. After his career, Hawkins had advocated for NFL players being financially covered by the "88 Plan", which provided funds annually to retired players requiring medical or custodial care from conditions like Alzheimer's and Parkinson's Diseases.
