= Earle Edwards =

American football player and coach (1902–1997)

- Edwards pictured in The Agromeck 1955, NC State yearbook

Biographical details
- Born: November 10, 1908
- Died: February 25, 1997 (aged 88); Raleigh, North Carolina, U.S.

Playing career
- 1928–1930: Penn State

Coaching career (HC unless noted)
- 1934–1935: Ebensburg-Cambria HS (PA)
- 1936–1948: Penn State (assistant)
- 1949–1953: Michigan State (ends)
- 1954–1970: NC State

Head coaching record
- Overall: 77–88–8 (college)
- Bowls: 1–1

Accomplishments and honors

Championships
- 5 ACC (1957, 1963–1965, 1968)

Awards
- 4× ACC Coach of the Year (1957, 1963, 1965, 1967)

Earle Edwards (November 10, 1908 – February 25, 1997) was an American football player and coach. He served as the head football coach at North Carolina State University from 1954 to 1970, compiling a record of 77–88–8. Edwards is the longest tenured coach in NC State Wolfpack football history and holds the program records for games coached and losses; he held the record for wins from November 2, 1963 (when he passed Beattie Feathers with his 38th victory) until November 4, 2023 when Dave Doeren passed him. His teams won five Atlantic Coast Conference (ACC) titles and made two Liberty Bowl appearances. Four times he was named the ACC Coach of the Year.

A native of Greensburg, Pennsylvania, Edwards attended Pennsylvania State University, where he lettered in football and later served as an assistant coach. He died on February 25, 1997, in Raleigh, North Carolina.

== Head coaching record ==
=== College ===
Year	Team	Overall	Conference	Standing	Bowl/playoffs	Coaches^{#}	AP^{°}
NC State Wolfpack (Atlantic Coast Conference) (1954–1970)
1954	NC State	2–8	0–4	T–8th			
1955	NC State	4–5–1	0–2–1	T–6th			
1956	NC State	3–7	2–4	6th			
1957	NC State	7–1–2	5–0–1	1st		20	15
1958	NC State	2–7–1	2–5	7th			
1959	NC State	1–9	0–6	T–7th			
1960	NC State	6–3–1	4–1–1	2nd			
1961	NC State	4–6	3–4	T–5th			
1962	NC State	3–6–1	3–4	T–4th			
1963	NC State	8–3	6–1	T–1st	L Liberty		
1964	NC State	5–5	5–2	1st			
1965	NC State	6–4	4–3	T–1st			
1966	NC State	5–5	5–2	2nd			
1967	NC State	9–2	5–1	2nd	W Liberty	17	
1968	NC State	6–4	6–1	1st			
1969	NC State	3–6–1	3–2–1	2nd			
1970	NC State	3–7–1	2–3–1	5th			
NC State:		77–88–8	55–45–5				
Total:		77–88–8					
National championship Conference title Conference division title or championship game berth
^{#}Rankings from final Coaches Poll.; ^{°}Rankings from final AP Poll.
