= 1958 South Carolina Gamecocks football team =

American college football season

1958 South Carolina Gamecocks football
- Conference: Atlantic Coast Conference

Ranking
- AP: No. 15
- Record: 7–3 (5–2 ACC)
- Head coach: Warren Giese (3rd season)
- Captains: King Dixon; Alex Hawkins; Dwight Keith
- Home stadium: Carolina Stadium

1958 Atlantic Coast Conference football standings
	Conf.					Overall
Team	W		L		T	W		L		T
No. 12 Clemson $	5	–	1	–	0	8	–	3	–	0
No. 15 South Carolina	5	–	2	–	0	7	–	3	–	0
Duke	3	–	2	–	0	5	–	5	–	0
North Carolina	4	–	3	–	0	6	–	4	–	0
Maryland	3	–	3	–	0	4	–	6	–	0
Wake Forest	2	–	4	–	0	3	–	7	–	0
NC State	2	–	5	–	0	2	–	7	–	1
Virginia	1	–	5	–	0	1	–	9	–	0
$ – Conference champion; Rankings from AP poll

The 1958 South Carolina Gamecocks football team represented the University of South Carolina as a member of the Atlantic Coast Conference (ACC) during the 1958 college football season. Led by third-year head coach Warren Giese, the Gamecocks compiled an overall record of 7–3 with a mark of 5–2 in conference play, placing second in the ACC. The team played home games at Carolina Stadium in Columbia, South Carolina.

In their final "Big Thursday" victory ever, South Carolina upset their archrival No. 10 Clemson.

The 1958 Gamecocks finished the season ranked in the AP Poll for the first time in school history. It would not be done again until 1984.

== Schedule ==
Date	Opponent	Rank	Site	Result	Attendance	Source
September 20	Duke		Carolina Stadium; Columbia, SC	W 8–0	38,000	
September 27	at No. 8 Army*	No. 18	Michie Stadium; West Point, NY	L 8–45	16,250–20,000	
October 4	at Georgia*		Sanford Stadium; Athens, GA (rivalry)	W 24–14	28,000	
October 11	at North Carolina		Kenan Memorial Stadium; Chapel Hill, NC (rivalry)	L 0–6	26,000	
October 23	No. 10 Clemson		Carolina Stadium; Columbia, SC (rivalry)	W 26–6	46,000	
November 1	at Maryland		Byrd Stadium; College Park, MD	L 6–10	17,000	
November 8	at Furman*		Sirrine Stadium; Greenville, SC	W 32–7		
November 15	Virginia^{†}		Carolina Stadium; Columbia, SC	W 28–14	20,000	
November 22	NC State		Carolina Stadium; Columbia, SC	W 12–7		
November 27	Wake Forest	No. 16	Carolina Stadium; Columbia, SC	W 24–7	16,000	
*Non-conference game; ^{†}Homecoming; Rankings from AP Poll released prior to the game
