= 1958 Clemson Tigers football team =

American college football season

1958 Clemson Tigers football

ACC champion

Sugar Bowl, L 0–7 vs. LSU
- Conference: Atlantic Coast Conference

Ranking
- Coaches: No. 13
- AP: No. 12
- Record: 8–3 (5–1 ACC)
- Head coach: Frank Howard (19th season)
- Captains: John Grdijan; Leon Kaltenback
- Home stadium: Memorial Stadium

1958 Atlantic Coast Conference football standings
	Conf.					Overall
Team	W		L		T	W		L		T
No. 12 Clemson $	5	–	1	–	0	8	–	3	–	0
No. 15 South Carolina	5	–	2	–	0	7	–	3	–	0
Duke	3	–	2	–	0	5	–	5	–	0
North Carolina	4	–	3	–	0	6	–	4	–	0
Maryland	3	–	3	–	0	4	–	6	–	0
Wake Forest	2	–	4	–	0	3	–	7	–	0
NC State	2	–	5	–	0	2	–	7	–	1
Virginia	1	–	5	–	0	1	–	9	–	0
$ – Conference champion; Rankings from AP poll

The 1958 Clemson Tigers football team was an American football team that represented Clemson College in the Atlantic Coast Conference (ACC) during the 1958 college football season. In its 19th season under head coach Frank Howard, the team compiled an 8–3 record (5–1 against conference opponents), won the ACC championship, was ranked No. 12 in the final AP Poll (No. 13 Coaches Poll), and outscored opponents by a total of 169 to 138. The team played its home games at Memorial Stadium in Clemson, South Carolina.

Coach Frank Howard's 100th win came September 27 against North Carolina. Clemson also played its first game against a No. 1 ranked team when it played LSU in the 1959 Sugar Bowl.

Center Bill Thomas was the team captain. The team's statistical leaders included quarterback Harvey White with 492 passing yards and 30 points scored (five touchdowns) and fullback Doug Cline with 450 rushing yards.

Three Clemson players were selected as first-team players on the 1958 All-Atlantic Coast Conference football team: Bill Thomas; end Ray Masneri; and tackle Jim Padgett.

== Schedule ==
Date	Opponent	Rank	Site	TV	Result	Attendance	Source
September 20	Virginia	No. 18	Memorial Stadium; Clemson, SC		W 20–15	20,000	
September 27	North Carolina		Memorial Stadium; Clemson, SC		W 26–21	40,000	
October 4	at Maryland	No. 10	Byrd Stadium; College Park, MD		W 8–0	24,000	
October 11	at Vanderbilt*	No. 8	Dudley Field; Nashville, TN		W 12–7	26,000	
October 23	at South Carolina	No. 10	Carolina Stadium; Columbia, SC (rivalry)		L 6–26	46,000	
November 1	Wake Forest	No. 19	Memorial Stadium; Clemson, SC		W 14–12	26,000	
November 8	at Georgia Tech*	No. 17	Grant Field; Atlanta, GA (rivalry)		L 0–13	44,726	
November 15	at NC State		Riddick Stadium; Raleigh, NC (rivalry)		W 13–6	12,000	
November 22	Boston College	No. 16	Memorial Stadium; Clemson, SC (rivalry)		W 34–12	19,000	
November 29	Furman*	No. 12	Memorial Stadium; Clemson, SC		W 36–19	16,000	
January 1, 1959	vs. No. 1 LSU*	No. 12	Tulane Stadium; New Orleans, LA (Sugar Bowl)	NBC	L 0–7	80,331	
*Non-conference game; Rankings from AP Poll released prior to the game
