= Split-T =

Offensive formation in American football

The split-T is an offensive formation in American football that was popular in the 1940s and 1950s. Developed by Missouri Tigers head coach Don Faurot as a variation on the T formation, the split-T was first used in the 1941 season and allowed the Tigers to win all but their season-opening match against the Ohio State Buckeyes and the 1942 Sugar Bowl versus Fordham. Jim Tatum and Bud Wilkinson, who coached under Faurot with the Iowa Pre-Flight Seahawks during World War II, brought the split-T to the Oklahoma Sooners in 1946. After Tatum left for Maryland in 1947, Wilkinson became the head coach and went on to win a record-setting 47 straight games and two national titles between 1953 and 1957.

== Basics ==
In the basic or tight-T formation, three running backs would line up about five yards behind the quarterback. The offensive linemen would form a fairly tight group in front of the backs. In the split-T, the offensive line was spread out over almost twice as much ground. This prompted the defensive front to widen as well, which created gaps for the offense to exploit.

The original split-T was a full house backfield. Later, Faurot would set up a flanker on one sideline. This was done after experience with nine man lines showed the flanker to create issues for the defense. The use of a split end to aid the passing game was optional, and was not an integral feature of either the split-T or the tight-T.

Faurot used the new formation to create what may have been the first option offense in football, which was a precursor of the wishbone, veer, and some modern run-first spread offenses. With the defense spread out, the offense would, in general, leave one defensive player on the play side unblocked. The blocking schemes were simple, with very little of the pulling or trapping of the more traditional power-running offenses.

The three base plays of the offense were the handoff (a dive play), the keep and the pitch play. The handoff was a fast play, with a halfback driving directly into the line, and the quarterback handing off within one yard of the line of scrimmage. Faurot judged this play to be the most dangerous in his offensive system, as the handoff occurred close to the line of scrimmage, close to potential interference by the defensive team.

If the dive play had not been called, then the quarterback kept the ball. The quarterback would run toward a spot just inside the unblocked defensive player. If that player closed on him, he would pitch the ball back to the outside trailing halfback, aiming for a spot outside that outside defensive player. When executed correctly, this resembled the two-on-one fast break of basketball, from which Faurot originally derived the concept (Faurot also lettered in basketball, as a student, and coached the Northeast Missouri State University basketball team to a conference championship prior to his tenure as the head football coach at Missouri).

== History ==
The split-T helped revolutionize college football, and some of its principles, such as the wishbone and veer formations, are in vogue today. However, when Don Faurot and his Missouri team unveiled it for the first time ever against Ohio State in my first game as head coach, it gave me some of the worst moments of my coaching career.

— Paul Brown, Brown and Clary, p. 82

Don Faurot, the head coach of the Missouri Tigers, developed the split-T and unleashed it onto the college football world in 1941. He combined this new formation with the athletes he had at running back and quarterback and created an offensive juggernaut. The Tigers finished the season 8-1, with the sole loss in the season opening out of conference game at #10 Ohio State. They were the Big Six Conference champions, ranked #7 in the AP poll, and accepted the invitation to play #6 Fordham in the 1942 Sugar Bowl.

Before the 1945 season, the rules committee abolished the rule that the quarterback must be at least 5 yards behind the line of scrimmage when throwing the ball, thus benefitting the formation. In 1946, Jim Tatum became the Oklahoma head coach. He installed the split-T offense that he had learned as an assistant coach under Don Faurot at the U.S. Navy's Iowa Pre-Flight school football team during World War II. In his first year, he turned around Oklahoma's losing record and delivered a Big Six Conference championship. In 1947, Tatum left Oklahoma for Maryland, where he saw even more success with the split-T, including a consensus national championship in 1953.

Bud Wilkinson, also a Faurot assistant at Iowa Pre-Flight, was the next Sooners head coach. In 1953, after losing to Notre Dame and tying Pittsburgh, Oklahoma beat arch-rivals Texas, 19–14, and went on to win their next 46 games in a row, setting an NCAA record that stands to this day. Notre Dame book-ended the streak when they again beat Oklahoma in Norman, 7–0 on November 16, 1957.

Tatum and Wilkinson would later face off in the 1954 Orange Bowl, when #1/#1 Maryland and #4/#5 Oklahoma met on the field for the first time. Both teams used the split-T as their base offense. Other top football programs used the split-T during this period as well, including Alabama, Houston, Notre Dame, Texas, Michigan, Penn State, and Ohio State.

== Bibliography ==
- Bible, Dana X., Championship Football, Prentice-Hall, 1947.
- Brown, Paul, and Clary, Jack, PB: The Paul Brown Story, Atheneum, 1979.
- Faurot, Don Secrets of the "Split-T" Formation, Prentice-Hall, 1950.
- Keith, Harold, Forty-Seven Straight: The Wilkinson Years at Oklahoma, University of Oklahoma Press, 1984.
