= Iowa Pre-Flight Seahawks football =

University of Iowa football team, 1942-1944

- First season: 1942
- Last season: 1944
- All-time record: 26–5 (.839)

The Iowa Pre-Flight Seahawks represented the U.S. Navy pre-flight school at the University of Iowa in the college football seasons of 1942, 1943, and 1944.

== History ==
The United States Navy commissioned pre-flight schools at the University of Georgia, the University of Iowa, the University of North Carolina at Chapel Hill, and Saint Mary's College of California in 1942. Cadets were given three months of rigorous physical training and instruction in basic aerial navigation and communications. Graduates were sent to basic flight schools and advanced flight training before assignment to the Pacific Fleet.

Athletics and training were emphasized at the schools. It was believed that the rigors of college football were ideal preparation for World War II. Numerous collegiate and professional athletes and coaches were recruited as instructors. They often played on or coached the football team of their respective school. Each team usually played established football powers in their respective region and other service academies.

Iowa Pre-Flight was coached by former Minnesota coach Bernie Bierman in 1942 and went 7–3. The Seahawks were coached by former Missouri coach Don Faurot in 1943 and went 9–1. They finished second in the final AP Poll and were named the service academy national champion. Iowa Pre-Flight was coached by former Auburn coach Jack Meagher in 1944 and went 10–1. They finished sixth in the final AP Poll.

Jim Tatum and Bud Wilkinson both served as assistant coaches for the Seahawks under Faurot. Tatum went on to coach at Oklahoma and Maryland. While at Maryland, Tatum recorded a national championship, three conference championships, and a 73–15–4 record without a single losing season. Wilkinson went on to coach at Oklahoma, where he won three national championships and set an NCAA record with 47 consecutive wins.

== See also ==
- List of World War II military service football teams
