= 1958 Big Ten Conference football season =

- Sport: American football
- Teams: 10
- Top draft pick: Randy Duncan
- Champion: Iowa
- Runners-up: Wisconsin
- Season MVP: Randy Duncan

Seasons
- ← 1957 1959 →

1958 Big Ten Conference football standings
	Conf.					Overall
Team	W		L		T	W		L		T
No. 2 Iowa $	5	–	1	–	0	8	–	1	–	1
No. 7 Wisconsin	5	–	1	–	1	7	–	1	–	1
No. 8 Ohio State	4	–	1	–	2	6	–	1	–	2
No. 13 Purdue	3	–	1	–	2	6	–	1	–	2
Indiana	3	–	2	–	1	5	–	3	–	1
Illinois	4	–	3	–	0	4	–	5	–	0
Northwestern	3	–	4	–	0	5	–	4	–	0
Michigan	1	–	5	–	1	2	–	6	–	1
Minnesota	1	–	6	–	0	1	–	8	–	0
Michigan State	0	–	5	–	1	3	–	5	–	1
$ – Conference champion; Rankings from AP Poll

The 1958 Big Ten Conference football season was the 63rd season of college football played by the member schools of the Big Ten Conference and was a part of the 1958 college football season.

The 1958 Iowa Hawkeyes football team, under head coach Forest Evashevski, won the Big Ten football championship and was ranked No. 2 in the final AP and UPI polls, both taken before the bowl games. After defeating California, 38–12, in the 1959 Rose Bowl, the Hawkeyes were voted national champion by the Football Writers Association of America in its post-bowl ranking. Iowa quarterback Randy Duncan won the Chicago Tribune Silver Football trophy as the Big Ten's most valuable player, was a consensus first-team All-American, and finished second in the 1958 voting for the Heisman Trophy.

The 1958 Wisconsin Badgers football team, under head coach Milt Bruhn, finished in second place in the Big Ten with a 7–1–1 record, led the conference in scoring defense (8.6 points allowed per game), and was ranked No. 7 in the final AP Poll. Wisconsin's sole loss was to Iowa. Dale Hackbart led the Badgers with 641 passing yards and 1,032 yards of total offense.

The 1958 Ohio State Buckeyes football team, under head coach Woody Hayes, compiled a 6–1–2 record and was ranked No. 8 in the final AP Poll. Fullback Bob White was a consensus first-team All-American and led the Big Ten with 859 rushing yards and 72 points scored. End Jim Houston and tackle Jim Marshall were also selected as first-team All-Americans by multiple selectors.

Other notable individual performances during the 1958 season include Michigan State end Sam Williams who was selected as a consensus first-team All-American and Illinois end Rich Kreitling who led the Big Ten with 688 receiving yards.

== Season overview ==
=== Results and team statistics ===
Conf. Rank	Team	Head coach	AP final	AP high	Overall record	Conf. record	PPG	PAG	MVP
1	Iowa	Forest Evashevski	#2	#2	8–1–1	5–1	**27.2**	14.6	**Randy Duncan**
2	Wisconsin	Milt Bruhn	#7	#4	7–1–1	5–1–1	22.3	**8.6**	Jon Hobbs; Dick Teteak
3	Ohio State	Woody Hayes	#8	#1	6–1–2	4–1–2	20.2	14.7	Jim Houston
4	Purdue	Jack Mollenkopf	#13	#8	6–1–2	3–1–2	20.4	11.3	Tom Franckhauser
5	Indiana	Phil Dickens	NR	NR	5–3–1	3–2–1	9.0	15.7	Mike Rabold
6	Illinois	Ray Eliot	NR	NR	4–5	4–3	16.0	16.7	Gene Cherney
7	Northwestern	Ara Parseghian	NR	#4	5–4	3–4	22.1	16.4	Ron Burton
8	Michigan	Bennie Oosterbaan	NR	#14	2–6–1	1–5–1	14.7	23.4	Bob Ptacek
9	Minnesota	Murray Warmath	NR	NR	1–8	1–6	12.8	17.4	Everett Gerths
10	Michigan State	Duffy Daugherty	NR	NR	3–5–1	0–5–1	13.0	13.7	Sam Williams

Key
AP final = Team's rank in the final AP Poll of the 1958 season
AP high = Team's highest rank in the AP Poll throughout the 1958 season
PPG = Average of points scored per game
PAG = Average of points allowed per game
MVP = Most valuable player as voted by players on each team as part of the voting process to determine the winner of the Chicago Tribune Silver Football trophy; trophy winner in bold

=== Preseason ===
Phil Dickens was hired by Indiana as its head football coach in 1957 but was suspended by the NCAA for recruiting violations. Accordingly, the 1958 season was Dickens' first as Indiana's head coach.

=== Bowl games ===
On January 1, 1959, Iowa defeated the California Golden Bears, 38–12, in the 1959 Rose Bowl. Iowa halfback Bob Jeter was named the Rose Bowl player of the game. Iowa finished No. 2 in the AP and UPI polls taken prior to the bowl games, but was named national champion in the FWAA poll taken after the bowl games.

=== Post-season developments ===
On November 14, 1958, Bennie Oosterbaan resigned as Michigan's head football coach with two games remaining in the program's worst season since 1936. Bump Elliott, who had been Michigan's backfield coach for two years, was hired to replace him.

== Statistical leaders ==
The Big Ten's individual statistical leaders for the 1958 season included the following:

=== Passing yards ===
Rank	Name	Team	Yards
1	Randy Duncan	Iowa	1,397
2	Dick Thornton	Northwestern	828
3	Bob Ptacek	Michigan	763
4	John Easterbrook	Illinois	656
5	Dale Hackbart	Wisconsin	641

=== Rushing yards ===
Rank	Name	Team	Yards
1	Bob White	Ohio State	859
2	Ron Burton	Northwestern	613
3	Don Clark	Ohio State	582
4	Ray Jauch	Iowa	524
5	Willie Fleming	Iowa	505

=== Receiving yards ===
Rank	Name	Team	Yards
1	Rich Kreitling	Illinois	688
2	Ron Burton	Northwestern	392
3	Don Norton	Iowa	374
4	Curt Merz	Iowa	354
5	Gary Prahst	Michigan	313

=== Total yards ===
Rank	Name	Team	Yards
1	Randy Duncan	Iowa	1,462
2	Dick Thornton	Northwestern	1,078
3	Dale Hackbart	Wisconsin	1,032
4	Bob Ptacek	Michigan	887
5	Bob White	Ohio State	859

=== Scoring ===
Rank	Name	Team	Points
1	Bob White	Ohio State	72
2	Bob Jarus	Purdue	60
2	Willie Fleming	Iowa	60
4	Dale Hackbart	Wisconsin	54
5	Ed Hart	Wisconsin	42

== Awards and honors ==
=== All-Big Ten honors ===
The following players were picked by the Associated Press (AP) and/or the United Press International (UPI) as first-team players on the 1958 All-Big Ten Conference football team.

Position	Name	Team	Selectors
Quarterback	Randy Duncan	Iowa	AP, UPI
Halfback	Ron Burton	Northwestern	AP, UPI
Halfback	Willie Fleming	Iowa	AP
Halfback	Don Clark	Ohio State	UPI
Fullback	Bob White	Ohio State	AP, UPI
End	Rich Kreitling	Illinois	AP, UPI
End	Jim Houston	Ohio State	AP
End	Sam Williams	Michigan State	UPI
Tackle	Gene Selawski	Purdue	AP, UPI
Tackle	Andy Cvercko	Northwestern	AP
Tackle	Jim Marshall	Ohio State	UPI
Guard	Ron Maltony	Purdue	AP
Guard	Jerry Stalcup	Wisconsin	AP
Guard	Bill Burrell	Illinois	UPI
Guard	Ellison Kelly	Michigan State	UPI
Center	Dick Teteak	Wisconsin	AP
Center	Mike Svendsen	Minnesota	UPI

=== All-American honors ===
At the end of the 1958 season, Big Ten players secured three of the 12 consensus first-team picks on the 1958 College Football All-America Team. The Big Ten's consensus All-Americans were:

Position	Name	Team	Selectors
Quarterback	Randy Duncan	Iowa	AFCA, AP, FWAA, NEA, SN, UPI, CP, WCFF
Fullback	Bob White	Ohio State	FWAA, NEA, SN, UPI, CP, Time, WCFF
End	Sam Williams	Michigan State	AFCA, UPI, Time, WC

Other Big Ten players who were named first-team All-Americans by at least one selector were:

Position	Name	Team	Selectors
End	Jim Houston	Ohio State	AP, FWAA, CP
End	Curt Merz	Iowa	FWAA
End	Tom Franckhauser	Purdue	CP
Tackle	Jim Marshall	Ohio State	TSN, Time
Tackle	Andy Cvercko	Northwestern	FWAA
Tackle	Gene Selawski	Purdue	FWAA

=== Other awards ===
Two Big Ten players finished among the top five in the voting for the 1958 Heisman Trophy: Iowa quarterback Randy Duncan (second); and Ohio State fullback Bob White (fourth).

== 1959 NFL draft ==
The following Big Ten players were among the first 100 picks in the 1959 NFL draft:

Name	Position	Team	Round	Overall pick
Randy Duncan	Quarterback	Iowa	1	1
Don Clark	Running back	Ohio State	1	7
Dan James	Center	Ohio State	1	8
Rich Kreitling	Wide receiver	Illinois	1	11
Mike Rabold	Tackle	Indiana	2	19
Dick Schafrath	Guard	Ohio State	2	23
Tom Franckhauser	End	Purdue	3	33
Fran O'Brien	Tackle	Michigan State	3	35
Gary Prahst	End	Michigan	4	37
Blanche Martin	Back	Michigan State	4	43
Nick Mumley	Tackle	Purdue	5	51
Andy Cvercko	Center	Northwestern	5	55
Dick LeBeau	Defensive back	Ohio State	5	58
Ellison Kelly	Guard	Michigan State	5	59
Mac Lewis	Tackle	Iowa	6	64
Palmer Pyle	Tackle	Michigan State	6	72
Mitch Ogiego	Quarterback	Iowa	7	79
Willmer Fowler	Back	Northwestern	8	86
Bob Ptacek	Quarterback	Michigan	8	87
Tom Barnett	Back	Purdue	8	91
Willie Smith	Tackle	Michigan	8	94
