= 1958 Ohio State Buckeyes football team =

American college football season

1958 Ohio State Buckeyes football
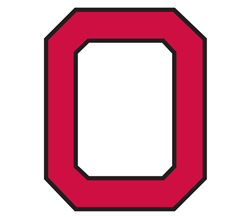
- Conference: Big Ten Conference

Ranking
- Coaches: No. 7
- AP: No. 8
- Record: 6–1–2 (4–1–2 Big Ten)
- Head coach: Woody Hayes (8th season)
- MVP: Jim Houston
- Captains: Frank Kremblas; Dick Schafrath
- Home stadium: Ohio Stadium

1958 Big Ten Conference football standings
	Conf.					Overall
Team	W		L		T	W		L		T
No. 2 Iowa $	5	–	1	–	0	8	–	1	–	1
No. 7 Wisconsin	5	–	1	–	1	7	–	1	–	1
No. 8 Ohio State	4	–	1	–	2	6	–	1	–	2
No. 13 Purdue	3	–	1	–	2	6	–	1	–	2
Indiana	3	–	2	–	1	5	–	3	–	1
Illinois	4	–	3	–	0	4	–	5	–	0
Northwestern	3	–	4	–	0	5	–	4	–	0
Michigan	1	–	5	–	1	2	–	6	–	1
Minnesota	1	–	6	–	0	1	–	8	–	0
Michigan State	0	–	5	–	1	3	–	5	–	1
$ – Conference champion; Rankings from AP Poll

The 1958 Ohio State Buckeyes football team was an American football team that represented the Ohio State University as a member of the Big Ten Conference during the 1958 Big Ten season. In their eighth year under head coach Woody Hayes, the Buckeyes compiled a 6–1–2 record (4–1–2 in conference games), finished in third place in the Big Ten, and outscored opponents by a total of 182 to 132. Against ranked opponents, they lost to No. 11 Northwestern, defeated No. 2 Iowa, and tied with No. 13 Wisconsin and No. 8 Purdue. They began the season ranked No. 1 in the AP poll, but dropped to No. 8 in the final poll.

The team's statistical leaders included fullback Bob White (859 rushing yards, 3.9 yards per carry, 12 touchdowns); quarterback Frank Kremblas (281 passing yards, 38.1% completion percentage); and end Jim Houston (127 receiving yards). Five Ohio State players received first-team honors on the 1958 All-Big Ten Conference football team: White (AP-1, UPI-1); Houston (AP-1, UPI-2); halfback Don Clark (AP-2, UPI-1); and tackle Jim Marshall (AP-2, UPI-1).

The team played its home games at Ohio Stadium in Columbus, Ohio.

== Schedule ==
Date	Opponent	Rank	Site	Result	Attendance	Source
September 27	No. 20 SMU*	No. 1	Ohio Stadium; Columbus, OH	W 23–20	83,113	
October 4	Washington*	No. 3	Ohio Stadium; Columbus, OH	W 12–7	82,901	
October 11	at Illinois	No. 5	Memorial Stadium; Champaign, IL (Illibuck)	W 19–13	50,416	
October 18	Indiana	No. 3	Ohio Stadium; Columbus, OH	W 49–8	82,964	
October 25	No. 13 Wisconsin	No. 2	Ohio Stadium; Columbus, OH	T 7–7	83,142	
November 1	at No. 11 Northwestern	No. 5	Dyche Stadium; Evanston, IL	L 0–21	51,102	
November 8	No. 8 Purdue	No. 16	Ohio Stadium; Columbus, OH	T 14–14	83,481	
November 15	at No. 2 Iowa	No. 16	Iowa Stadium; Iowa City, IA	W 38–28	58,643	
November 22	Michigan	No. 11	Ohio Stadium; Columbus, OH (rivalry)	W 20–14	83,248	
*Non-conference game; Rankings from AP Poll released prior to the game; Source:

== Roster ==
1958 Ohio State Buckeyes football team roster
Players
Coaches
Offense

Pos.	#	Name	Class
QB	22	Frank Kremblas	Sr
HB	44	Dick LeBeau	Sr
FB		Bob White	Jr

Defense

Pos.	#	Name	Class

Special teams

Pos.	#	Name	Class

Head coach

- Woody Hayes

Coordinators/assistant coaches

Legend

- (C) Team captain
- (S) Suspended
- (I) Ineligible
- Injured
- Redshirt

== Game summaries ==
=== SMU ===
Team	1	2	3	4	Total
SMU	0	14	0	6	20
• Ohio St	8	7	8	0	23

- Date: September 27
- Location: Ohio Stadium
- Game attendance: 83,113

=== Washington ===
Team	1	2	3	4	Total
Washington	7	0	0	0	7
• Ohio State	6	0	0	6	12

- Date: October 4
- Location: Ohio State
- Game attendance: 82,901
- Game weather: Clear, 68 °F (20 °C)

Scoring summary
Q1	WASH	McKeta 12 yard run (Fleming kick)	WASH 0–7
Q1	OSU	Fields 1 yard run (run failed)	WASH 6–7
Q4	OSU	Clark 1 yard run (run failed)	OSU 12–7

=== Illinois ===
Team	1	2	3	4	Total
• Ohio State	6	0	13	0	19
Illinois	0	6	0	7	13

- Date: October 10
- Location: Memorial Stadium, Champaign, Illinois
- Game attendance: 54,416
- Game weather: Clear, WNW wind 25 mph 54 °F (12 °C)

=== Indiana ===
Team	1	2	3	4	Total
Indiana	0	0	0	8	8
• Ohio State	14	7	14	14	49

- Date: October 18
- Location: Ohio Stadium
- Game attendance: 82,964
- Game weather: Clear, 59 °F (15 °C)

=== Wisconsin ===
Team	1	2	3	4	Total
Wisconsin	0	0	7	0	7
Ohio State	0	0	7	0	7

- Date: October 25
- Location: Ohio Stadium
- Game attendance: 83,142
- Game weather: Rain, 52 °F (11 °C)

Scoring summary
Q3	WIS	Hackbart 64 punt return (Shwaiko kick)	WIS 0–7
Q3	OSU	White 1 yard run (Kilgore kick)	TIED 7–7

=== Northwestern ===
Team	1	2	3	4	Total
Ohio State	0	0	0	0	0
• Northwestern	0	0	7	14	21

- Date: November 1
- Location: Dyche Stadium, Evanston, Illinois
- Game attendance: 51,102

Scoring summary
Q3	NW	Thornton 67 yard pass to Burton (Thornton kick)	NW 0–7
Q4	NW	Thornton 1 yard run (kick failed)	NW 0–13
Q4	NW	Thornton 3 yard pass to E. Kimbrough (Thornton pass to Burton good)	NW 0–21

=== Purdue ===
Team	1	2	3	4	Total
Purdue	0	0	0	14	14
Ohio State	7	7	0	0	14

- Date: November 8
- Location: Ohio Stadium
- Game attendance: 83,481
- Game weather: Rain, 54 °F (12 °C)

Scoring summary
Q1	OSU	Marshall blocked punt return for 22 yards (Kilgore kick)	OSU 7–0
Q2	OSU	Marshall interception return for 25 yards (Kilgore kick)	OSU 14–0
Q4	PUR	Jarus 2 yard run (point no good)	OSU 14–7
Q4	PUR	Fichtner 7 yard pass to Brooks (Fichtner pass to Brooks)	TIED 14–14

=== Iowa ===
Team	1	2	3	4	Total
• Ohio State	7	14	7	10	38
Iowa	7	14	7	0	28

- Date: November 15
- Location: Iowa Stadium, Iowa City, Iowa
- Game attendance: 58,643
- Game weather: Cloudy, wind NE 15 mph, 51 °F (11 °C)

Scoring summary
Q1	OSU	Clark 25 yard run (Kilgore kick)	OSU 7–0
Q1	IOWA	Duncan 1 yard run (Prescott kick)	TIED 7–7
Q2	OSU	White 71 yard run (Kilgore kick)	OSU 14–7
Q2	IOWA	Fleming 1 yard run (Prescott kick)	TIED 14–14
Q2	OSU	White 1 yard run (Kilgore kick)	OSU 21–14
Q2	IOWA	Duncan 3 yard pass to Fleming (Prescott kick)	TIED 21–21
Q3	OSU	Clark 37 yard run (Kilgore kick)	OSU 28–21
Q3	IOWA	Nocera 21 yard run (Prescott kick)	TIED 28–28
Q4	OSU	White 1 yard run (Kilgore kick)	OSU 35–28
Q4	OSU	Kilgore 12 yard field goal	OSU 38–28

Statistics

- Rushing: Bob White 209 yards, three touchdowns

=== Michigan ===
Team	1	2	3	4	Total
Michigan	6	8	0	0	14
• Ohio State	0	12	8	0	20

- Date: November 22
- Location: Ohio Stadium
- Game attendance: 83,248
- Game weather: Clear, 45 °F (7 °C)

Scoring summary
Q1	MICH	Ptacek 7 yard pass to Prahst (extra point failed)	MICH 0–6
Q2	OSU	LeBeau 8 yard run (extra point failed)	TIED 6–6
Q2	MICH	Ptacek 32 yard pass to Prahst (Ptacek pass to Prahst)	MICH 6–14
Q2	OSU	Fields 25 yard pass to Herbstreit (extra point failed)	MICH 12–14
Q3	OSU	White 6 yard run (Fields run)	OSU 20–14

== Coaching staff ==
- Woody Hayes – Head coach – 8th year

== 1959 NFL draftees ==
Player	Round	Pick	Position	NFL club
Don Clark	1	7	Back	Chicago Bears
Dan James	1	8	Tackle	San Francisco 49ers
Dick Schafrath	2	23	Tackle	Cleveland Browns
Dick LeBeau	5	58	Defensive back	Cleveland Browns
Jerry Lee Murphy	20	231	Tackle	Chicago Cardinals
Frank Kremblas	23	275	Quarterback	New York Giants
Ernie Spychalski	25	298	Tackle	Cleveland Browns
John Scott	26	307	Defensive tackle	Pittsburgh Steelers
