= 1958 Michigan State Spartans football team =

American college football season

1958 Michigan State Spartans football
- Conference: Big Ten Conference
- Record: 3–5–1 (0–5–1 Big Ten)
- Head coach: Duffy Daugherty (5th season)
- MVP: Sam Williams
- Captain: Sam Williams
- Home stadium: Spartan Stadium

1958 Big Ten Conference football standings
	Conf.					Overall
Team	W		L		T	W		L		T
No. 2 Iowa $	5	–	1	–	0	8	–	1	–	1
No. 7 Wisconsin	5	–	1	–	1	7	–	1	–	1
No. 8 Ohio State	4	–	1	–	2	6	–	1	–	2
No. 13 Purdue	3	–	1	–	2	6	–	1	–	2
Indiana	3	–	2	–	1	5	–	3	–	1
Illinois	4	–	3	–	0	4	–	5	–	0
Northwestern	3	–	4	–	0	5	–	4	–	0
Michigan	1	–	5	–	1	2	–	6	–	1
Minnesota	1	–	6	–	0	1	–	8	–	0
Michigan State	0	–	5	–	1	3	–	5	–	1
$ – Conference champion; Rankings from AP Poll

The 1958 Michigan State Spartans football team represented Michigan State University in the 1958 Big Ten Conference football season. In their fifth season under head coach Duffy Daugherty, the Spartans compiled a 3–5–1 overall record (0–5–1 against Big Ten opponents) and finished in last place in the Big Ten Conference.

Two Spartans were selected as first-team players on the 1958 All-Big Ten Conference football team: end Sam Williams (AP-2, UPI-1) and guard Ellison Kelly (UPI-1). Halfback Dean Look was selected for the second team. Williams was also selected as a consensus first-team player on the 1958 College Football All-America Team.

The 1958 Spartans lost the annual Indiana–Michigan State football rivalry game by a 6 to 0 score and played to a 12 to 12 tie in the annual Michigan–Michigan State football rivalry game. In non-conference play, the Spartans won all three games, defeating California (32–12), Pittsburgh (22–8), and Kansas State (26–7).

== Schedule ==
Date	Opponent	Rank	Site	Result	Attendance	Source
September 27	California*	No. 4	Spartan Stadium; East Lansing, MI	W 32–12	52,639	
October 4	No. 16 Michigan	No. 4	Spartan Stadium; East Lansing, MI (rivalry)	T 12–12	76,434	
October 11	No. 10 Pittsburgh*	No. 9	Spartan Stadium; East Lansing, MI	W 22–8	56,793	
October 18	at Purdue	No. 5	Ross–Ade Stadium; West Lafayette, IN	L 6–14	48,468	
October 25	at Illinois	No. 20	Memorial Stadium; Champaign, IL	L 0–16	68,811	
November 1	No. 8 Wisconsin^{†}		Spartan Stadium; East Lansing, MI	L 7–9	71,040	
November 8	at Indiana		Memorial Stadium; Bloomington, IN (rivalry)	L 0–6	18,000	
November 15	at Minnesota		Memorial Stadium; Minneapolis, MN	L 12–39	53,647	
November 22	Kansas State*		Spartan Stadium; East Lansing, MI	W 26–7	39,032	
*Non-conference game; ^{†}Homecoming; Rankings from AP Poll released prior to the game; Source:
