= 1958 Illinois Fighting Illini football team =

American college football season

1958 Illinois Fighting Illini football
- Conference: Big Ten Conference
- Record: 4–5 (4–3 Big Ten)
- Head coach: Ray Eliot (17th season)
- MVP: Gene Cherney
- Captain: Jack Delveaux
- Home stadium: Memorial Stadium

1958 Big Ten Conference football standings
	Conf.					Overall
Team	W		L		T	W		L		T
No. 2 Iowa $	5	–	1	–	0	8	–	1	–	1
No. 7 Wisconsin	5	–	1	–	1	7	–	1	–	1
No. 8 Ohio State	4	–	1	–	2	6	–	1	–	2
No. 13 Purdue	3	–	1	–	2	6	–	1	–	2
Indiana	3	–	2	–	1	5	–	3	–	1
Illinois	4	–	3	–	0	4	–	5	–	0
Northwestern	3	–	4	–	0	5	–	4	–	0
Michigan	1	–	5	–	1	2	–	6	–	1
Minnesota	1	–	6	–	0	1	–	8	–	0
Michigan State	0	–	5	–	1	3	–	5	–	1
$ – Conference champion; Rankings from AP Poll

The 1958 Illinois Fighting Illini football team was an American football team that represented the University of Illinois as a member of the Big Ten Conference during the 1958 Big Ten season. In their 17th year under head coach Ray Eliot, the Fighting Illini compiled a 4–5 record (4–3 in conference game), finished in sixth place in the Big Ten, and were outscored by a total of 150 to 144.

The team's statistical leaders included quarterback John Easterbrook (656 passing yards, 51.5% completion percentage), Marshall Starks (303 rushing yards, 4.7 yards per carry), and Rich Kreitling (23 receptions for 688 yards, 29.9 yards per reception). Center Gene Cherney was selected as the team's most valuable player. Kreitling and guard Bill Burrell received first-team honors on the 1958 All-Big Ten Conference football team.

The team played its home games at Memorial Stadium in Champaign, Illinois.

== Schedule ==
Date	Opponent	Site	Result	Attendance	Source
September 27	UCLA*	Memorial Stadium; Champaign, IL	L 14–18	46,775	
October 4	at Duke*	Duke Stadium; Durham, NC	L 13–15	25,000	
October 11	No. 5 Ohio State	Memorial Stadium; Champaign, IL (Illibuck)	L 13–19	50,416	
October 18	at Minnesota	Memorial Stadium; Minneapolis, MN	W 20–8	58,174	
October 25	No. 20 Michigan State	Memorial Stadium; Champaign, IL	W 16–0	68,811	
November 1	at No. 10 Purdue	Ross–Ade Stadium; West Lafayette, IN (rivalry)	L 8–31	46,357	
November 8	at Michigan	Michigan Stadium; Ann Arbor, MI (rivalry)	W 21–8	58,788	
November 15	No. 5 Wisconsin	Memorial Stadium; Champaign, IL	L 12–31	45,937	
November 22	No. 20 Northwestern	Memorial Stadium; Champaign, IL (rivalry)	W 27–20	32,390	
*Non-conference game; Rankings from AP Poll released prior to the game; Source:
