= Phil Dickens =

American athlete, coach, and administrator (1914–1983)

Biographical details
- Born: June 29, 1915; Spartanburg, South Carolina, U.S.
- Died: November 16, 1983 (aged 68)

Playing career

Football
- 1934–1936: Tennessee
- Position: Halfback

Coaching career (HC unless noted)

Football
- 1939–1941: Wofford (backfield)
- 1942–1943: NC State (backfield)
- 1945–1946: Mississippi State (assistant)
- 1947–1952: Wofford
- 1953–1956: Wyoming
- 1958–1964: Indiana

Basketball
- 1941–1942: Wofford

Baseball
- 1941–1942: Wofford

Administrative career (AD unless noted)
- 1947–1952: Wofford

Head coaching record
- Overall: 89–68–10 (football); 10–14 (basketball)
- Bowls: 1–1

Accomplishments and honors

Championships
- Football; 5 South Carolina Little Four/Three (1948–1952); 1 Skyline (1956)

Awards
- Third-team All-American (1936); First-team All-SEC (1936); Second-team All-SEC (1934)

William Phillip Dickens (June 29, 1914 – November 16, 1983) was an American football player, coach of football, basketball and baseball, and college athletics administrator. He served as the head football coach at Wofford College (1947–1952), the University of Wyoming (1953–1956), and Indiana University Bloomington (1958–1964), compiling a career record of 89–68–10. Dickens was also the head basketball coach at Wofford for one season in 1941–42, tallying a mark of 10–14, Wofford' head baseball coach for two seasons, from 1941 to 1942, and the school's athletic director from 1947 to 1952.

During his tenure at Indiana, Dickens compiled a 20–41–2 record. His best season came in 1958, where his Hoosiers went 5–3–1, with upset wins over Michigan State, and Michigan; earning him Big Ten/Midwest Coach of the Year and third place as National Coach of the Year. He was inducted into the Indiana Football Hall of Fame in 1974. Dickens attended the University of Tennessee, where he was a third-team All-American in 1936 and All-SEC in 1936 at halfback.

== Controversy ==
During his time at Indiana University, Dickens was investigated for violations in athletic recruiting. Dickens was hired as the head football coach at Indiana in 1957 after his success at Wofford College and Wyoming. Knowing that the Hoosiers were at a recruiting disadvantage, Dickens blatantly disregarded the rules, with reports of 17 violations by the Indiana football program in his first three months. Reports stated that the school offered, "$50 per month, or expense-paid travel between the prospects hometown and Bloomington." Although no offenses were consummated, Indiana chose to forbid Dickens from performing any coaching related activities during the 1957 football season. Additionally, Indiana was placed on probation for one year by the NCAA.

On December 22, 1964, Dickens resigned as Indiana's head football coach and was given a new position as the university's general manager of off-campus physical facilities. In seven seasons, he compiled a 20–41–2 record with the Hoosiers. Due to over-zealous recruiting, he had been suspended for the 1957 season, and the team had been placed on probation from 1960 to 1963.

== Head coaching record ==
=== Football ===
Year	Team	Overall	Conference	Standing	Bowl/playoffs	Coaches^{#}	AP^{°}
Wofford Terriers (South Carolina Little Four / South Carolina Little Three) (1947–1952)
1947	Wofford	6–5					
1948	Wofford	4–0–5		1st			
1949	Wofford	11–1		1st	L Cigar		
1950	Wofford	7–2–1		1st			
1951	Wofford	6–3–1		1st			
1952	Wofford	6–5		1st			
Wofford:		40–16–7					
Wyoming Cowboys (Skyline Conference) (1953–1956)
1953	Wyoming	5–4–1	4–2–1	3rd			
1954	Wyoming	6–4	5–1	2nd			
1955	Wyoming	8–3	5–2	T–3rd	W Sun		
1956	Wyoming	10–0	7–0	1st		16	
Wyoming:		29–11–1	21–5–1				
Indiana Hoosiers (Big Ten Conference) (1958–1964)
1958	Indiana	5–3–1	3–2–1	5th			
1959	Indiana	4–4–1	2–4–1	T–8th			
1960	Indiana	1–8	0–7	10th			
1961	Indiana	2–7	0–6	9th			
1962	Indiana	3–6	1–5	9th			
1963	Indiana	3–6	1–5	10th			
1964	Indiana	2–7	1–5	T–9th			
Indiana:		20–41–2	8–34–2				
Total:		89–68–10					
National championship Conference title Conference division title or championship game berth
^{#}Rankings from final Coaches Poll.; ^{°}Rankings from final AP Poll.
