= 1958 Michigan Wolverines football team =

American college football season

1958 Michigan Wolverines football
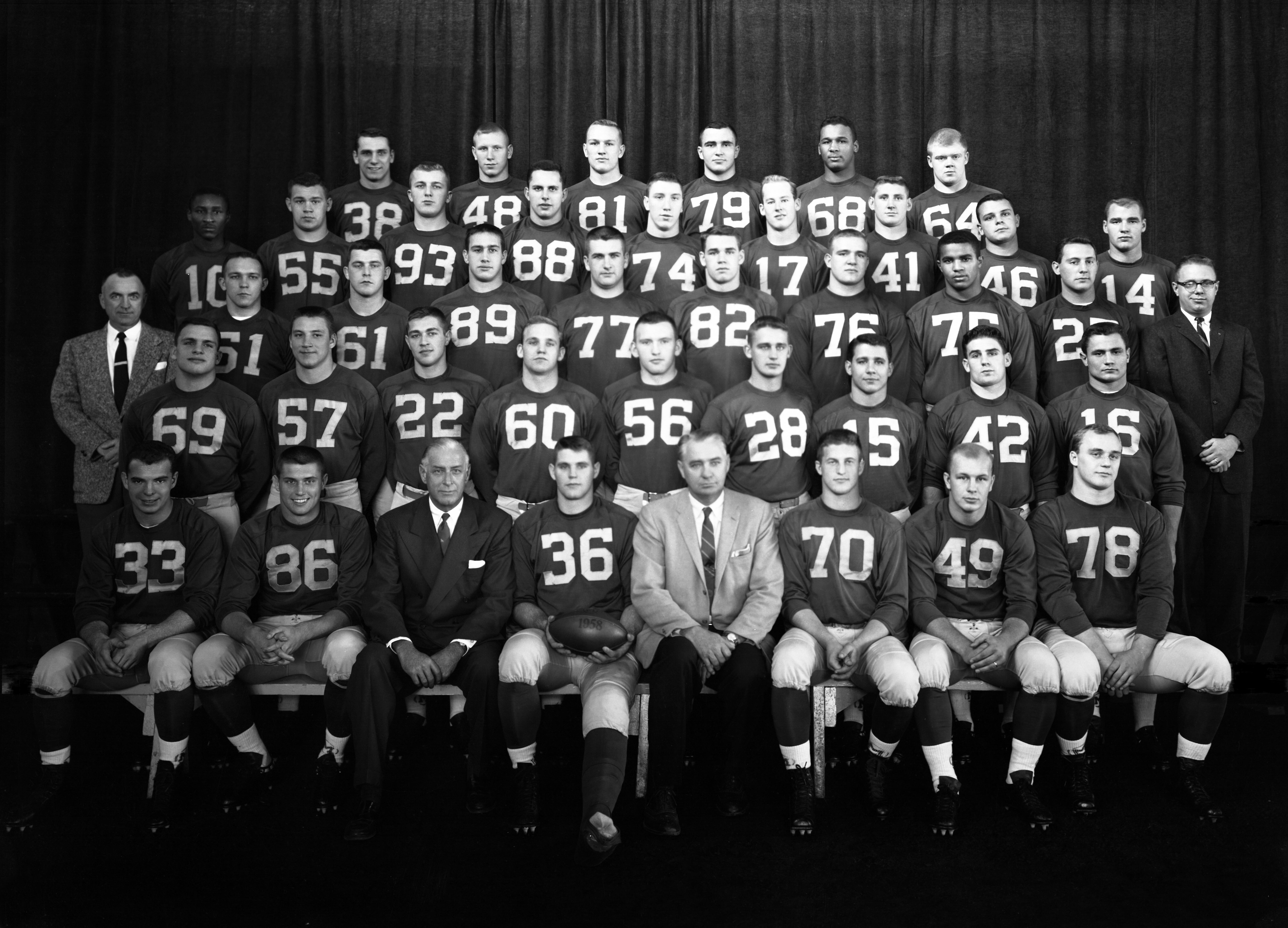
- Conference: Big Ten Conference
- Record: 2–6–1 (1–5–1 Big Ten)
- Head coach: Bennie Oosterbaan (11th season)
- MVP: Bob Ptacek
- Captain: John Herrnstein
- Home stadium: Michigan Stadium

1958 Big Ten Conference football standings
	Conf.					Overall
Team	W		L		T	W		L		T
No. 2 Iowa $	5	–	1	–	0	8	–	1	–	1
No. 7 Wisconsin	5	–	1	–	1	7	–	1	–	1
No. 8 Ohio State	4	–	1	–	2	6	–	1	–	2
No. 13 Purdue	3	–	1	–	2	6	–	1	–	2
Indiana	3	–	2	–	1	5	–	3	–	1
Illinois	4	–	3	–	0	4	–	5	–	0
Northwestern	3	–	4	–	0	5	–	4	–	0
Michigan	1	–	5	–	1	2	–	6	–	1
Minnesota	1	–	6	–	0	1	–	8	–	0
Michigan State	0	–	5	–	1	3	–	5	–	1
$ – Conference champion; Rankings from AP Poll

The 1958 Michigan Wolverines football team represented the University of Michigan in the 1958 Big Ten Conference football season. In its 11th and final year under head coach Bennie Oosterbaan, Michigan compiled a 2–6–1 record (1–5–1 against conference opponents), finished in eighth place in the Big Ten, and were outscored by opponents by a combined total of 211 to 132 points.

The team got off to a promising start with a 20–19 victory over USC and a 12–12 tie with a Michigan State team that was ranked No. 2 in the Coaches Poll. After two games, Michigan was ranked No. 12 in the Coaches Poll. The team then lost six of its final seven games. On October 18, the Wolverines lost, 55–24, to Northwestern, the worst beating in program history. Bennie O0sterbaan resigned after the 1958 season.

Fullback John Herrnstein was the team captain, and quarterback Bob Ptacek received the team's most valuable player award. The team's statistical leaders included Bob Ptacek with 763 passing yards, left halfback Darrell Harper with 309 rushing yards, and left end Gary Prahst with 313 receiving yards.

== Schedule ==
Date	Opponent	Rank	Site	Result	Attendance	Source
September 27	USC*		Michigan Stadium; Ann Arbor, MI	W 20–19	77,005	
October 4	at No. 4 Michigan State	No. 16	Spartan Stadium; East Lansing, MI (rivalry)	T 12–12	76,434	
October 11	No. 12 Navy*	No. 14	Michigan Stadium; Ann Arbor, MI	L 14–20	82,220	
October 18	at No. 17 Northwestern	No. 19	Dyche Stadium; Evanston, IL (rivalry)	L 24–55	41,345	
October 25	Minnesota^{†}		Michigan Stadium; Ann Arbor, MI (Little Brown Jug)	W 20–19	72,981	
November 1	No. 2 Iowa		Michigan Stadium; Ann Arbor, MI	L 14–37	68,566	
November 8	Illinois		Michigan Stadium; Ann Arbor, MI (rivalry)	L 8–21	58,788	
November 15	Indiana		Michigan Stadium; Ann Arbor, MI	L 6–8	31,000–47,590	
November 22	at No. 11 Ohio State		Ohio Stadium; Columbus, OH (rivalry)	L 14–20	83,248	
*Non-conference game; ^{†}Homecoming; Rankings from AP Poll released prior to the game

== Game summaries ==
=== USC ===
Week 1: USC at Michigan

Team	1	2	3	4	Total
USC	0	7	0	12	19
• Michigan	7	7	6	0	20

- Date: September 27
- Location: Ann Arbor, MI
- Game attendance: 77,005

Scoring summary
1	MICH	John Herrnstein 12-yard run (Myers kick)	MICH 7–0
2	USC	Tom Maudlin 1-yard sneak (Rex Johnston kick)	TIE 7–7
2	MICH	Brad Myers 2-yard run (Stan Noskin kick)	MICH 14–7
3	MICH	Herrnstein 12-yard run (Myers kick failed)	MICH 20–7
4	USC	Rex Johnston 66-yard run (Johnston kick failed)	MICH 20–13
4	USC	Hilliard Hill 36-yard pass from Maudlin (Maudlin pass failed)	MICH 20–19

On September 27, 1958, Michigan defeated USC, 20–19, before a crowd of 77,005 at Michigan Stadium in Ann Arbor, Michigan.

Fullback and captain John Herrnstein rushed for 144 yards and two touchdowns on 26 carries. Herrnstein's first touchdown came on Michigan's first possession. Michigan started the drive on the USC 37-yard line after Gary Prahst partially blocked a punt. Michigan led, 14–7, at halftime and 20–7 at the end of the third quarter. The fourth quarter began with USC at Michigan's one-yard line, but USC halfback Rex Johnston fumbled on the goal line, and Michigan recovered the ball. Later in the quarter, Johnston ran 67 yards for a touchdown, but Johnston missed the extra-point kick, narrowing Michigan's lead to 20–13. On its next drive, Tom Maudlin threw a 36-yard touchdown pass to Hilliard Hill. USC lined up in kick formation for the extra point, but a late substitution cost them five yards. On the next play, an illegal procedure penalty pushed USC back to the 13-yard line. USC then shifted out of the kick formation, and Maudlin threw to Bob Arnett in an attempted two point conversion, but Arnett was tackled at the seven-yard line.

== Statistical leaders ==
Michigan's individual statistical leaders for the 1958 season include those listed below.

=== Rushing ===
Player	Attempts	Net yards	Yards per attempt	Touchdowns
Darrell Harper	55	309	5.6	2
Brad Myers	82	202	2.5	3
Fred Julian	45	180	4.0	0

=== Passing ===
Player	Attempts	Completions	Interceptions	Comp %	Yards	Yds/Comp	TD	Long
Bob Ptacek	115	65	9	56.5	760	11.7	3	37
Stan Noskin	29	13	1	44.8	204	15.7	1	33
Darrell Harper	14	8	0	57.1	131	16.4	0	56

=== Receiving ===
Player	Receptions	Yards	Yds/Recp	TD	Long
Gary Prahst	22	313	14.2	2	37
Brad Myers	17	169	9.9	0	35
Darrell Harper	13	137	10.5	1	36

=== Kickoff returns ===
Player	Returns	Yards	Yds/Return	TD	Long
Brad Myers	8	173	21.6	0	29
Bob Ptacek	6	134	22.3	0	41
Fred Julian	5	88	17.6	0	25

=== Punt returns ===
Player	Returns	Yards	Yds/Return	TD	Long
Bob Ptacek	8	73	9.1	0	19
Brad Myers	7	63	9.0	0	20
Darrell Harper	5	33	6.6	0	15

== Personnel ==
=== Letter winners ===
The following 40 players received varsity letters for their participation on the 1958 team. Players who started at least four games are shown with their names in bold.

- John Batsakes, 5'8", 172 pounds, senior, Ann Arbor, MI - halfback
- Jared Bushong, 6'2", 209 pounds, junior, Toledo, OH – started 1 game at right tackle
- Reid J. Bushong, 6'1", 179 pounds, sophomore, Toledo, OH - halfback
- James Byers, 6'0", 198 pounds, senior, Evansville, IN - center
- **Alex Callahan**, 6'0", 195 pounds, senior, Wyandotte, MI – started 9 games at left guard
- **Donald R. Deskins**, 6'2", 241 pounds, sophomore, Jamaica, NY – started 8 games at right tackle
- **James Dickey**, 6'1", 191 pounds, senior, Miamisburg, OH – started 9 games at center
- Michael Fillichio, 5'10", 190 pounds, junior, River Forest, IL - guard
- **George Genyk**, 6'1", 200 pounds, junior, Detroit – started 9 games at left tackle
- James P. Gray, 6'3", 233 pounds, senior, Battle Creek, MI - tackle
- Alvin Groce, 5'11", 166 pounds, junior, Clairton, PA - halfback
- John Halstead, 6'2", 205 pounds, sophomore, Bay City, MI - end
- Darrell Harper, 6'1", 195 pounds, junior, Royal Oak, MI – started 3 games at left halfback
- John Herrnstein, 6'2", 215 pounds, senior, Chillicothe, OH – started 3 games at fullback
- Willard R. Hildebrand, 6'2", 216 pounds, sophomore, Chillicothe, OH - tackle
- E. Thomas Jobson, 6'0", 201 pounds, sophomore, Flint, MI - guard
- Robert Johnson, 6'2", 199 pounds, senior, Chicago - end
- **Walter N. Johnson**, 6'2", 214 pounds, senior, Dearborn, MI – started 9 games at right end
- **Fred Julian**, 5'9", 184 pounds, junior, Detroit – started 9 games at right halfback
- Gary F. Kane, 6'2", 215 pounds, sophomore, Elgin, IL - end
- William MacPhee, 6'0", 191 pounds, senior, Grand Haven, MI - center
- **Jerry Marcinak**, 6'2", 236 pounds, Chicago – started 9 games at right guard
- Gary McNitt, 5'9", 196 pounds, sophomore, Mesick, MI - halfback
- **Brad Myers**, 6'0", 196 pounds, junior, Evanston, IL – started 6 games at left halfback
- Harry Newman Jr., 5'9", 185 pounds, sophomore, Franklin, MI - halfback
- Stan Noskin, 5'11", 180 pounds, junior, Chicago - quarterback
- Douglas F. Oppman, 5'10", 192 pounds, junior, Gary, IN - guard
- Paul Poulos, 5'11", 198 pounds, junior, Freedom, PA - guard
- **Gary Prahst**, 6'4", 220 pounds, senior, Berea, OH – started 9 games at left end
- **Bob Ptacek**, 6'1", 204 pounds, senior, Cleveland – started 9 games at quarterback
- **Gene Sisinyak**, 6'0", 195 pounds, sophomore, Monroe, MI – started 4 games at fullback
- Gerald Smith, 5'11", 185 pounds, junior, Detroit - center
- Willie Smith, 6'2", 243 pounds, senior, Little Rock, AR – tackle
- John Spidel, 5'11", 180 pounds, senior, Greenville, OH - quarterback
- Maynard Stetten, 6'2", 206 pounds, senior, Gibraltar, MI - tackle
- William R. Stine, 6'1", 215 pounds, sophomore, Toledo, OH - tackle
- Richard Syring, 6'0", 189 pounds, sophomore, Bay City, OH - center
- James Sytek, 5'11", 194 pounds, senior, Detroit - quarterback
- John C. Walker, 6'0", 195 pounds, sophomore, Milford, MI - fullback
- John Zachary, 5'9", 174 pounds, senior, Chicago - halfback

=== Non-letter winners ===
- Tony Rio, 6'0", 189 pounds, senior, Chicago – started 2 games at fullback

=== Freshmen ===
- George Mans, 6'4", 205 pounds, Trenton, MI - end
- Bennie McRae, 6'0", 170 pounds, Newport News, VA - halfback
- John Stamos, 6'2", 200 pounds, Chicago - quarterback
- Bill Tunnicliff, 6'1", 200 pounds, Ferndale, MI - fullback

=== Coaches and staff ===
- Head coach: Bennie Oosterbaan
- Assistant coaches:

- Jack Blott - line coach
- Don Dufek, Sr. - freshman coach
- Bump Elliott - backfield coach
- Bob Hollway - assistant line coach
- Cliff Keen - assistant football coach, head wrestling coach
- Matt Patanelli - end coach
- Wally Weber - recruiting and eligibility

- Trainer: Jim Hunt
- Equipment manager - Henry Hatch
- Manager: Tom Hitchman

== Awards and honors ==
Team honors and awards for the 1958 season went to the following individuals.

- Captain: John Herrnstein
- Most Valuable Player: Bob Ptacek
- Meyer Morton Award: Dick Syring
- John Maulbetsch Award: John Walker
