= 1958 Indiana Hoosiers football team =

American college football season

1958 Indiana Hoosiers football
- Conference: Big Ten Conference
- Record: 5–3–1 (3–2–1 Big Ten)
- Head coach: Phil Dickens (1st season)
- MVP: Mike Rabold
- Captain: Mike Rabold
- Home stadium: Memorial Stadium

1958 Big Ten Conference football standings
	Conf.					Overall
Team	W		L		T	W		L		T
No. 2 Iowa $	5	–	1	–	0	8	–	1	–	1
No. 7 Wisconsin	5	–	1	–	1	7	–	1	–	1
No. 8 Ohio State	4	–	1	–	2	6	–	1	–	2
No. 13 Purdue	3	–	1	–	2	6	–	1	–	2
Indiana	3	–	2	–	1	5	–	3	–	1
Illinois	4	–	3	–	0	4	–	5	–	0
Northwestern	3	–	4	–	0	5	–	4	–	0
Michigan	1	–	5	–	1	2	–	6	–	1
Minnesota	1	–	6	–	0	1	–	8	–	0
Michigan State	0	–	5	–	1	3	–	5	–	1
$ – Conference champion; Rankings from AP Poll

The 1958 Indiana Hoosiers football team represented the Indiana Hoosiers in the 1958 Big Ten Conference football season. They participated as members of the Big Ten Conference. The Hoosiers played their home games at Memorial Stadium in Bloomington, Indiana. The team was coached by Phil Dickens in his first year as head coach of the Hoosiers.

== Schedule ==
Date	Opponent	Site	Result	Attendance	Source
September 27	at No. 5 Notre Dame*	Notre Dame Stadium; Notre Dame, IN	L 0–18	49,347	
October 4	West Virginia*	Memorial Stadium; Bloomington, IN	W 13–12	20,000	
October 11	at No. 17 Iowa	Iowa Stadium; Iowa City, IA	L 13–34	50,700	
October 18	at No. 3 Ohio State	Ohio Stadium; Columbus, OH	L 8–49	82,964	
October 25	No. 6 (small) Miami (OH)*	Memorial Stadium; Bloomington, IN	W 12–7	18,000	
November 1	Minnesota^{†}	Memorial Stadium; Bloomington, IN	W 6–0	25,000	
November 8	Michigan State	Memorial Stadium; Bloomington, IN (rivalry)	W 6–0	18,000	
November 15	at Michigan	Michigan Stadium; Ann Arbor, MI	W 8–6	31,000–47,590	
November 22	at No. 8 Purdue	Ross–Ade Stadium; West Lafayette, IN (Old Oaken Bucket)	T 15–15	43,507	
*Non-conference game; ^{†}Homecoming; Rankings from AP Poll released prior to the game; Source:

== 1959 NFL draftees ==
Player	Position	Round	Pick	NFL club
Mike Rabold	Tackle	2	19	Detroit Lions
Tom Campbell	Back	24	285	Los Angeles Rams
Bob Corrigan	Guard	27	314	Chicago Cardinals
John Aveni	End	27	321	Chicago Bears
