= 1958 Wisconsin Badgers football team =

American college football season

1958 Wisconsin Badgers football
- Conference: Big Ten Conference

Ranking
- Coaches: No. 6
- AP: No. 7
- Record: 7–1–1 (5–1–1 Big Ten)
- Head coach: Milt Bruhn (3rd season)
- MVPs: Jon Hobbs; Dick Teteak
- Captains: Jon Hobbs; Dave Kocourek
- Home stadium: Camp Randall Stadium

1958 Big Ten Conference football standings
	Conf.					Overall
Team	W		L		T	W		L		T
No. 2 Iowa $	5	–	1	–	0	8	–	1	–	1
No. 7 Wisconsin	5	–	1	–	1	7	–	1	–	1
No. 8 Ohio State	4	–	1	–	2	6	–	1	–	2
No. 13 Purdue	3	–	1	–	2	6	–	1	–	2
Indiana	3	–	2	–	1	5	–	3	–	1
Illinois	4	–	3	–	0	4	–	5	–	0
Northwestern	3	–	4	–	0	5	–	4	–	0
Michigan	1	–	5	–	1	2	–	6	–	1
Minnesota	1	–	6	–	0	1	–	8	–	0
Michigan State	0	–	5	–	1	3	–	5	–	1
$ – Conference champion; Rankings from AP Poll

The 1958 Wisconsin Badgers football team represented the University of Wisconsin in the 1958 Big Ten Conference football season. Led by third-year head coach Milt Bruhn, the Badgers compiled an overall record of 7–1–1 with a mark of 5–1–1 in conference play, placing second in the Big Ten.

== Schedule ==
Date	Opponent	Rank	Site	Result	Attendance	Source
September 26	at No. 15 Miami (FL)*	No. 14	Burdine Stadium; Miami, FL	W 20–0	62,084	
October 4	Marquette*	No. 9	Camp Randall Stadium; Madison, WI	W 50–0	42,513	
October 11	No. 13 Purdue	No. 6	Camp Randall Stadium; Madison, WI	W 31–6	51,028	
October 18	No. 13 Iowa	No. 4	Camp Randall Stadium; Madison, WI (rivalry)	L 9–20	65,241	
October 25	at No. 2 Ohio State	No. 13	Ohio Stadium; Columbus, OH	T 7–7	83,142	
November 1	at Michigan State	No. 8	Spartan Stadium; East Lansing, MI	W 9–7	71,040	
November 8	No. 4 Northwestern^{†}	No. 7	Camp Randall Stadium; Madison, WI	W 17–13	62,964	
November 15	at Illinois	No. 5	Memorial Stadium; Champaign, IL	W 31–12	45,937	
November 22	Minnesota	No. 5	Camp Randall Stadium; Madison, WI (rivalry)	W 27–12	54,517	
*Non-conference game; ^{†}Homecoming; Rankings from AP Poll released prior to the game; Source:

== Game summaries ==
=== Minnesota ===
Team	1	2	3	4	Total
Minnesota	0	0	6	6	12
• Wisconsin	7	7	6	7	27

- Date: November 22
- Location: Camp Randall Stadium, Madison, WI
- Game attendance: 54,517

Scoring summary
1	WIS	Sid Williams 20-yard run (kick good)	WIS 7-0
2	WIS	Dale Hackbart 7-yard run (kick good)	WIS 14-0
3	WIS	Bob Zeman 2-yard run	WIS 20-0
3	MINN	Dick Johnson 77-yard pass from Larry Johnson	WIS 20-6
4	WIS	Billy Hobbs 44-yard pass from Dale Hackbart (kick good)	WIS 27-6
4	MINN	Larry Johnson 2-yard run	WIS 27-12

Wisconsin completed their best Big Ten finish since 1952 in front of a Dad's Day crowd as their defense intercepted six passes, one short of their own conference record.

== Team players in the 1959 NFL draft ==
Player	Position	Round	Pick	NFL club
Bob Zeman	Back	10	119	Cleveland Browns
Dick Teteak	Guard	15	169	Green Bay Packers
Dave Kocourek	Wide Receiver	19	223	Pittsburgh Steelers
Jim Fraser	Guard	21	250	Cleveland Browns
Lowell Jenkins	Tackle	27	315	Philadelphia Eagles
