= 1958 Northwestern Wildcats football team =

American college football season

1958 Northwestern Wildcats football
- Conference: Big Ten Conference

Ranking
- Coaches: No. 17
- Record: 5–4 (3–4 Big Ten)
- Head coach: Ara Parseghian (3rd season)
- MVP: Ron Burton
- Captains: James Andreotti; Willmer Fowler
- Home stadium: Dyche Stadium

1958 Big Ten Conference football standings
	Conf.					Overall
Team	W		L		T	W		L		T
No. 2 Iowa $	5	–	1	–	0	8	–	1	–	1
No. 7 Wisconsin	5	–	1	–	1	7	–	1	–	1
No. 8 Ohio State	4	–	1	–	2	6	–	1	–	2
No. 13 Purdue	3	–	1	–	2	6	–	1	–	2
Indiana	3	–	2	–	1	5	–	3	–	1
Illinois	4	–	3	–	0	4	–	5	–	0
Northwestern	3	–	4	–	0	5	–	4	–	0
Michigan	1	–	5	–	1	2	–	6	–	1
Minnesota	1	–	6	–	0	1	–	8	–	0
Michigan State	0	–	5	–	1	3	–	5	–	1
$ – Conference champion; Rankings from AP Poll

The 1958 Northwestern Wildcats team represented Northwestern University during the 1958 Big Ten Conference football season. In their third year under head coach Ara Parseghian, the Wildcats compiled a 5–4 record (3–4 against Big Ten Conference opponents), finished in seventh place in the Big Ten, and outscored their opponents by a combined total of 199 to 148.

== Schedule ==
Date	Opponent	Rank	Site	Result	Attendance	Source
September 27	Washington State*		Dyche Stadium; Evanston, IL	W 29–28	27,420	
October 4	Stanford*		Dyche Stadium; Evanston, IL	W 28–0	25,132	
October 11	at Minnesota		Memorial Stadium; Minneapolis, MN	W 7–3	56,061	
October 18	No. 19 Michigan	No. 17	Dyche Stadium; Evanston, IL (rivalry)	W 55–24	41,345	
October 25	at No. 7 Iowa	No. 8	Iowa Stadium; Iowa City, IA	L 20–26	59,275	
November 1	No. 5 Ohio State	No. 11	Dyche Stadium; Evanston, IL	W 21–0	51,102	
November 8	at No. 7 Wisconsin	No. 4	Camp Randall Stadium; Madison, WI	L 13–17	62,964	
November 15	No. 8 Purdue	No. 13	Dyche Stadium; Evanston, IL	L 6–23	38,421	
November 22	at Illinois	No. 20	Memorial Stadium; Champaign, IL (rivalry)	L 20–27	32,390	
*Non-conference game; Rankings from AP Poll released prior to the game; Source:
