= 1958 Iowa Hawkeyes football team =

American college football season

1958 Iowa Hawkeyes football

National champion (FWAA) Big Ten champion Rose Bowl champion

Rose Bowl, W 38–12 vs. California
- Conference: Big Ten Conference

Ranking
- Coaches: No. 2
- AP: No. 2
- Record: 8–1–1 (5–1 Big Ten)
- Head coach: Forest Evashevski (7th season)
- MVP: Randy Duncan
- Home stadium: Iowa Stadium

1958 Big Ten Conference football standings
	Conf.					Overall
Team	W		L		T	W		L		T
No. 2 Iowa $	5	–	1	–	0	8	–	1	–	1
No. 7 Wisconsin	5	–	1	–	1	7	–	1	–	1
No. 8 Ohio State	4	–	1	–	2	6	–	1	–	2
No. 13 Purdue	3	–	1	–	2	6	–	1	–	2
Indiana	3	–	2	–	1	5	–	3	–	1
Illinois	4	–	3	–	0	4	–	5	–	0
Northwestern	3	–	4	–	0	5	–	4	–	0
Michigan	1	–	5	–	1	2	–	6	–	1
Minnesota	1	–	6	–	0	1	–	8	–	0
Michigan State	0	–	5	–	1	3	–	5	–	1
$ – Conference champion; Rankings from AP Poll

The 1958 Iowa Hawkeyes football team was an American football team that represented the University of Iowa as a member of the Big Ten Conference during the 1958 Big Ten football season. In their seventh season under head coach Forest Evashevski, the Hawkeyes compiled an 8–1–1 record (5–1 in conference games), won the Big Ten championship, and outscored opponents by a total of 234 to 134. They played six ranked opponents, defeating No. 6 TCU, No. 4 Wisconsin, No. 8 Northwestern, and No. 15 Notre Dame, but losing to No. 16 Ohio State. They concluded their season with a victory over No. 16 California in the 1959 Rose Bowl. The Hawkeyes were ranked No. 2 in the final AP and UPI polls, but the Football Writers Association of America (FWAA) selected Iowa as the national champion.

The 1958 Hawkeyes gained 2,554 rushing yards and 1,617 passing yards. On defense, they gave up 1,707 rushing yards and 1,213 passing yards. They led the country in total offense, and their mark of 255.4 rushing yards per game remains an Iowa season record.

The team's statistical leaders included Ray Jauch (524 rushing yards), quarterback Randy Duncan (106-of-179 passing for 1,397 yards), end Don Norton (25 receptions for 374 yards), and Willie Fleming (66 points scored, 27.6 yards per punt return). Duncan was a consensus All-American, received the Walter Camp Trophy and the Chicago Tribune Silver Football, finished second in the voting for the Heisman Trophy, and was the No. 1 pick in the 1959 NFL draft. John Nocera was the team captain.

The team played its home games at Iowa Stadium in Iowa City, Iowa. Home attendance totaled 329,673 an average of 54,912 per game.

== Schedule ==
Date	Opponent	Rank	Site	TV	Result	Attendance	Source
September 27	No. 6 TCU*		Iowa Stadium; Iowa City, IA		W 17–0	54,500	
October 4	Air Force*	No. 8	Iowa Stadium; Iowa City, IA		T 13–13	48,325	
October 11	Indiana	No. 17	Iowa Stadium; Iowa City, IA		W 34–13	50,700	
October 18	at No. 4 Wisconsin	No. 13	Camp Randall Stadium; Madison, WI (rivalry)		W 20–9	65,241	
October 25	No. 8 Northwestern	No. 7	Iowa Stadium; Iowa City, IA		W 26–20	59,275	
November 1	at Michigan	No. 2	Michigan Stadium; Ann Arbor, MI		W 37–14	68,566	
November 8	at Minnesota	No. 2	Memorial Stadium; Minneapolis, MN (rivalry)		W 28–6	64,485	
November 15	No. 16 Ohio State	No. 2	Iowa Stadium; Iowa City, IA		L 28–38	58,643	
November 22	No. 15 Notre Dame*	No. 6	Iowa Stadium; Iowa City, IA		W 31–21	58,320	
January 1, 1959	vs. No. 16 California*	No. 2	Rose Bowl; Pasadena, CA (Rose Bowl)	NBC	W 38–12	98,297	
*Non-conference game; Rankings from AP Poll released prior to the game; Source:

== Rankings ==
Ranking movements Legend: ██ Increase in ranking ██ Decrease in ranking — = Not ranked ( ) = First-place votes
	Week											
Poll	Pre	1	2	3	4	5	6	7	8	9	10	Final
AP	13	—	8 (15)	17	13 (1)	7 (13)	2 (33)	2 (54)	2 (52)	6 (4)	4 (16)	2 (17)
Coaches								2	2	6	2	2

== Preseason ==
Prior to 1958, coach Forest Evashevski had compiled a 31–21–3 record in six seasons with the Hawkeyes. His most successful years were the previous two, 1956 and 1957, in which Iowa went 16–2–1. The 1956 team became the first to win the Big Ten Conference championship in 34 years, and their 1957 Rose Bowl victory over Oregon State was the first postseason trip and win in school history. Both teams finished in the top ten in the final AP Poll.

Expectations for the 1958 season were high, despite the graduation of two star players. Tackle Alex Karras, who won the 1957 Outland Trophy and was twice selected as an All-American, and end Jim Gibbons, an All-American in 1957, were both drafted by the Detroit Lions in the 1958 NFL draft. Senior quarterback Randy Duncan, who also started in 1957, would be relied on heavily to replace the lost talent.

== Game summaries ==
=== TCU ===
Iowa's season opener against TCU was played under the shadow of a new press box, which would watch over nearly five decades of Hawkeye football. Iowa beat the No. 6 Horned Frogs easily, 17–0. The win shot the Hawkeyes up to No. 8 in the September 29 poll. TCU, the eventual Southwest Conference champions, would finish in the top ten of the final poll with an 8–2–1 record.

=== Air Force ===
The Air Force Academy had only played two seasons of varsity football when they came to Iowa City on October 4. The Falcons surprised the Hawkeyes with a 13–13 tie. The draw dropped Iowa to No. 17 in the October 6 poll, but Evashevski later said, "If we had beaten the Air Force we never in the world would have won the Big Ten championship." Air Force won their next nine games and tied TCU in the Cotton Bowl Classic to finish in the top ten of the final poll with a 9–0–2 record.

=== Indiana ===
Iowa recovered from the tie with Air Force by crushing usually weak Indiana in both teams' Big Ten opener, 34–13. The victory was the Hawkeyes' sixth straight over the Hoosiers and Iowa rose to No. 13 in the October 13 poll.

=== At Wisconsin ===
Wisconsin was Iowa's first test in the Big Ten. The No. 4 Badgers hosted the Hawkeyes on October 18. Iowa had not won in Madison since 1946. It was the second game in four weeks the Hawkeyes had played against a top ten team. Iowa had little trouble with Wisconsin, winning by a score of 20–9, the Badgers' only Big Ten loss of the season. The game would end up deciding the Big Ten championship, as Iowa finished 5–1 in the Big Ten and Wisconsin finished 5–1–1. Having now defeated two top ten teams, Iowa jumped to No. 7 in the October 20 poll.

=== Northwestern ===
Iowa hosted No. 8 Northwestern on October 25, the third game in five weeks the Hawkeyes had played against a top ten team. It was the first game between two top ten Big Ten teams of the season. Iowa's homecoming game against the Wildcats was tighter than the Wisconsin game, but the Hawkeyes prevailed 26–20. The highlight of the game was All-American end Curt Merz's one-handed touchdown catch. The Hawkeyes' second victory over a top ten team in as many weeks earned them the No. 2 spot in the October 27 poll. The next day, Iowa was ranked No. 1 by United Press International. It was the first time the Hawkeyes had ever topped a national football poll.

=== At Michigan ===
Michigan was in the midst of its worst season in twenty-two years when undefeated Iowa came to town on November 1. Michigan Stadium was only two-thirds full that day, and the Hawkeyes blew out the uninspired Wolverines. All-Big Ten halfback Willie Fleming opened the scoring, running 72 yards for a touchdown on a punt return on the final play of the first quarter. Halfback Ray Jauch, who led the nation in yards per carry in 1958, ran 74 yards for a touchdown early in the second quarter to put Iowa up 14–0. Michigan also scored a touchdown in the second quarter, but Iowa led by eight points at halftime. Michigan scored another touchdown and completed a two-point conversion to tie the game early in the third quarter. Iowa responded with twenty-three unanswered points to win the game 37–14. Bob Jeter had touchdown runs of 3 yards in the third quarter and 27 yards in the fourth quarter, the latter of which was followed by a two-point conversion pass from John Nocera to Curt Merz. Fleming also ran 61 yards for a touchdown in the fourth quarter, which was followed by a two-point conversion pass from Randy Duncan to Merz. The victory was Iowa's first over Michigan in thirty-four years, and Michigan alumnus Evashevski's first in six attempts. Iowa remained No. 2 in the November 3 AP Poll and No. 1 in the November 4 UPI Poll.

=== At Minnesota ===
Iowa played their final road game of the season in Minneapolis on November 8. Minnesota did not figure to be much of a challenge. The Golden Gophers were 0–6 and had not won a football game in over a year. The Hawkeyes did not disappoint, winning 28–6. The victory clinched the Big Ten championship and a trip to the Rose Bowl for Iowa, whose Big Ten record remained perfect. Iowa remained No. 2 in the November 10 AP Poll, but dropped to No. 2 in the November 11 UPI Poll.

=== Ohio State ===
Team	1	2	3	4	Total
• No. 16 Buckeyes	7	14	7	10	38
No. 2 Hawkeyes	7	14	7	0	28

- Date: November 15
- Location: Iowa Stadium, Iowa City, Iowa
- Game attendance: 58,643
- Game weather: Cloudy, wind NE 15 mph, 51 °F (11 °C)

Scoring summary
1	OSU	Clark 25 yard run (Kilgore kick)	OSU 7–0
1	IOWA	Duncan 1 yard run (Prescott kick)	TIED 7–7
2	OSU	White 71 yard run (Kilgore kick)	OSU 14–7
2	IOWA	Fleming 1 yard run (Prescott kick)	TIED 14–14
2	OSU	White 1 yard run (Kilgore kick)	OSU 21–14
2	IOWA	Duncan 3 yard pass to Fleming (Prescott kick)	TIED 21–21
3	OSU	Clark 37 yard run (Kilgore kick)	OSU 28–21
3	IOWA	Nocera 21 yard run (Prescott kick)	TIED 28–28
4	OSU	White 1 yard run (Kilgore kick)	OSU 35–28
4	OSU	Kilgore 12 yard field goal	OSU 38–28

Ohio State was the only team to beat Iowa in 1957, so the Hawkeyes had a chip on their shoulder when they hosted the No. 16 Buckeyes on November 15. Despite their efforts, Iowa fell to Ohio State, 38–28. It was again the Hawkeyes' only loss of the season, but this year they had already clinched the Big Ten championship. Iowa sank to No. 6 in the November 17 and 18 polls.

=== Notre Dame ===
Iowa hosted No. 15 Notre Dame on November 22 in the Hawkeyes' final game of the regular season and the seniors' final game in Iowa Stadium. Iowa defeated the Fighting Irish by a score of 31–21. The Hawkeyes finished the season with a 7–1–1 record, as in 1957, but this year they would travel to Pasadena to play the Pacific Coast Conference champion California in the Rose Bowl. Iowa rose to No. 4 and No. 2 in the penultimate AP and UPI Polls on November 24 and 25, respectively.

=== Vs. California—Rose Bowl ===
	1	2	3	4	Total
Iowa	7	13	12	6	38
California	0	0	6	6	12

The No. 2 Iowa Hawkeyes (7–1–1, 5–1 Big Ten) and the No. 16 California Golden Bears (7–3, 6–1 Pacific Coast) met in the forty-fifth Rose Bowl Game on January 1, 1959, in the Rose Bowl in Pasadena, California. The Hawkeyes were favored by 18½ points. Randy Duncan helped Iowa take a 14–0 lead with a touchdown run in the first quarter and a touchdown pass to Jeff Langston in the second quarter. The Hawkeye backfield carried Iowa the rest of the way, as Willie Fleming ran for two touchdowns and Bob Jeter, the Rose Bowl Most Valuable Player, and Don Horn each ran for one touchdown. Iowa attempted a Rose Bowl record three two-point conversions and failed on all three, while Bob Prescott made one of two extra points. End Jack Hart scored all of California's twelve points, running for a touchdown in the third quarter and catching a touchdown in the fourth quarter, both of which were followed by failed two-point conversion attempts. Iowa broke four Rose Bowl records: longest run (Jeter 81), team rushing yards (429), team total yards (516) and individual rushing yards (Jeter 194); and tied another Rose Bowl record set by Georgia in 1943: first downs (24). The attendance was 98,297.

Team	Play	Score
Iowa	Duncan 2 run (Prescott kick)	7–0
Iowa	Langston 7 pass from Duncan (Prescott kick)	14–0
Iowa	Horn 4 run (kick failed)	20–0
California	Hart 1 run (pass failed)	20–6
Iowa	Fleming 37 run (pass failed)	26–6
Iowa	Jeter 81 run* (pass failed)	32–6
Iowa	Fleming 7 run (pass failed)	38–6
California	Hart 17 pass from Kapp (run failed)	38–12

Team	Iowa	California
First downs	24*	20
Rushing yards	429*	214
Passing	9–14–0	9–20–2
Passing yards	87	130
Total yards	516*	344
Punts–average	3–41	5–37
Fumbles–lost	3–1	2–2
Penalties–yards	5–55	5–35

Individual	Iowa	California
Rushing	Jeter 9–194*, 1 touchdown; Fleming 9–85, 2 touchdowns	Olguin 9–62; Patton 9–45
Passing	Ogiego 4–5–0, 37 yards	Kapp 8–17–1, 126 yards, 1 touchdown
Receiving	Prescott 3–31	Hart 4–61, 1 touchdown; Garvin 1–31

* Rose Bowl record

== Personnel ==
=== Players ===
The following players received varsity letters for their performance on the 1958 Iowa football team:

- John Brown, fullback, No. 43, 5-11, 165 pounds
- John A. Burroughs Jr., tackle, senior, No. 72, 6-4, 220 pounds, Youngstown, OH
- Hugh Drake, guard, No. 66, 6-0, 195 pounds, Shenandoah, IA
- Randy Duncan, quarterback, senior, No. 25, 6-0, 180 pounds, Des Moines, IA
- Willie Fleming, halfback, sophomore, No. 15, 5-9, 173 pounds, Hamtramck, MI
- Kevin Furlong, halfback, No. 47, 5-10, 164 pounds, Detroit
- Bill Gravel, halfback, No. 14, 5-9, 180 pounds, Hobart, IN
- Gary Grouwinkel, guard, No. 60, 6-1, 210 pounds
- Bob Hain, tackle, No. 70, 6-2, 225 pounds, Davenport, IA
- Don Horn, fullback, No. 30, 5-10, 187 pounds, Wapello, IA
- Lloyd Humphreys, center, No. 51, 6-1, 198 pounds
- Ray Jauch, halfback, junior, No. 46, 5-11, 175 pounds, Mendota, IL
- Bob Jeter, halfback, junior, No. 11, 6-1, 183 pounds, Weirton, WV
- Paul Karras, tackle, No. 92, 6-1, 210 pounds, Gary, IN
- Jeff Langston, end, 175 pounds
- Bill Lapham, center, No. 52, 6-3, 230 pounds, Des Moines, IA
- Charles Lee, tackle, No. 79, 6-1, 230 pounds
- John Leshyn, center, No. 90, 5-11, 190 pounds
- Mac Lewis, tackle, No. 55, 6-6, 280 pounds, Chicago
- Mark Manders, guard
- Curt Merz, guard/end, No. 82, 6-4, 215 pounds, Springfield, NJ
- Ernie Mielke, tackle, No. 96, 6-1, 210 pounds
- Al Miller, end
- John Nocera, fullback, senior, No. 33, 6-1, 210 pounds, Youngstown, OH
- Don Norton, end, No. 89, 6-1, 175 pounds, Anamosa, IA
- Gerald Novack, guard, No. 65, 6-0, 205 pounds
- Mitchell Ogiego, quarterback, No. 23, 6-2, 185 pounds
- Bob Prescott, end, No. 86, 6-3, 200 pounds, Sioux City, IA
- John Sawin, tackle, No. 78, 6-1, 208 pounds
- Bill Scott, tackle, No. 71, 6-8, 235 pounds
- Donald Shipanick, guard, No. 68, 6-0, 175 pounds
- Jim Spaan, halfback/end, No. 17, 5-11, 183 pounds
- Olen Treadway, quarterback, No. 22, 5-10, 178 pounds, Muskogee, OK
- Steve Turner, center, No. 53, 6-0, 190 pounds

=== Coaches and administrators ===
- Head coach: Forest Evashevski
- Assistant coaches: Jerry Burns, Bob Commings, Jerry Hilgenberg

== Awards ==
Iowa finished 8–1–1 overall and 5–1 in the Big Ten Conference in 1958. The Hawkeyes won the 1958 Big Ten football championship and the 1959 Rose Bowl Game. The Football Writers Association of America named Iowa the 1958 college football national champion by awarding the team the 1958 Grantland Rice Award. The Hawkeyes finished No. 2 in the final AP and UPI polls, which were released before the bowl games, behind LSU.

The final AP Poll ranking is the highest in school history. Iowa also finished No. 2 in the final UPI Poll in 1960. The Hawkeyes led the nation in total offense (405.9 yards per game), were ranked second in passing offense (170.0 yards per game), ninth in rushing offense (235.9 yards per game) and ninth in scoring offense (26.0 points per game).

Quarterback Randy Duncan was named the 1958 Big Ten Most Valuable Player and was selected to the 1958 All-Big Ten first team and the 1958 All-America first team (unanimous). He finished second in the 1958 Heisman Trophy voting behind Pete Dawkins of Army. In 1997 Duncan was inducted into the College Football Hall of Fame. End Curt Merz was selected to the 1958 All-America first team. Halfback Willie Fleming was selected to the 1958 All-Big Ten first team. Thirty-four Iowa Hawkeyes, including Duncan, Merz and Fleming, won letters in 1958.

== 1959 NFL draft ==
Player	Position	Round	Pick	NFL club
Randy Duncan	Quarterback	1	1	Green Bay Packers
Mac Lewis	Tackle	6	64	Chicago Cardinals
Mitch Ogiego	Quarterback	7	79	Washington Redskins
Back	28	336	Baltimore Colts	
