= Dale Hackbart =

American football player (born 1938)

No. 40, 46, 49, 48
- Position: Safety

Personal information
- Born: July 21, 1938 (age 88); Madison, Wisconsin, U.S.
- Listed height: 6 ft 3 in (1.91 m)
- Listed weight: 210 lb (95 kg)

Career information
- High school: Madison East
- College: Wisconsin
- NFL draft: 1960: 5th round, 51st overall pick
- AFL draft: 1960

Career history
- Green Bay Packers (1960–1961); Washington Redskins (1961–1963); Minnesota Vikings (1965)*; Winnipeg Blue Bombers (1965); Minnesota Vikings (1966–1970); St. Louis Cardinals (1971–1972); Denver Broncos (1973)
- * Offseason or practice squad member only

Awards and highlights
- 2× NFL champion (1961, 1969); Second-team All-American (1959); First-team All-Big Ten (1959); Second-team All-Big Ten (1958)

Career NFL statistics
- Interceptions: 19
- Fumble recoveries: 7
- Total touchdowns: 4
- Stats at Pro Football Reference

Dale Leonard Hackbart (born July 21, 1938) is an American former professional football player who was a defensive back and special teams player for 12 seasons in the National Football League (NFL) for the Green Bay Packers, Washington Redskins, Minnesota Vikings, St. Louis Cardinals, and Denver Broncos from 1960 to 1973. He also played in the Canadian Football League (CFL) for the Winnipeg Blue Bombers in 1965.

Hackbart's career ended shortly after suffering a serious neck injury in the first game of the 1973 season, which he asserted was the result of a reckless blow to the back of his neck by Boobie Clark well after play had come to a stop. Hackbart brought a civil tort lawsuit in a United States district court seeking money damages, which was dismissed by a trial court, but reinstated on appeal. This opened the possibility for an athlete in any sport to bring a civil lawsuit against an opponent for reckless conduct in an athletic competition that injures that player.

Hackbart was diagnosed with breast cancer in late December 1998, and was successfully treated. He became a spokesman for the Susan G. Komen Breast Cancer Foundation, especially in making men aware that they could be subject to the disease as well as women, and the need for early detection and treatment to survive.

== Early life ==
Hackbart was born on July 21, 1938, in Madison, Wisconsin. He attended Madison East High School, which participated in the Big Eight Conference. Hackbart was a two-way player on East's football team, playing quarterback and safety. As a 6 ft 3 in (1.91 m) 179 lb (81.2 kg) senior in 1955, the Associated Press (AP) named Hackbart Wisconsin's top high school quarterback. The Capital Times selected him first team on its All-Madison Area Football Team. The Big Eight Conference sportswriters also named him first team all-conference that year.

Hackbart was also a star player on East's basketball team. He was the leading scorer in the Big Eight Conference during his senior year (1955–56). Arguably his finest high school basketball performance was during a January 1956 game when he scored 38 points in a 68–65 Madison East victory, while also being a dominant rebounder, controlling the offense as a passer, and contributing steals on defense.

== College career ==
Hackbart attended the University of Wisconsin. He played quarterback for the Wisconsin Badgers from 1957 to 1959, in the Big Ten Conference. He was also a key player for the Badgers on defense. As a sophomore in 1957, he played behind Sidney Williams at quarterback. He completed 12 of 31 passing attempts for 161 yards; and was the team's second leading rusher with 319 yards, averaging 6.1 yards per carry. He also had a team leading six rushing touchdowns (tied for sixth best in the Big Ten). The Badgers finished the season 6–3, and were ranked 19th nationally by the Associated Press.

Hackbart was the Badgers' primary quarterback in 1958. He had 46 pass completion in 99 attempts for 641 yards, and four passing touchdowns, along with three interceptions. He also rushed for 391 yards in 101 carries, with nine rushing touchdowns. He was fourth in the Big Ten in passing yards and touchdowns, and third in rushing touchdowns and total yards. Both the Associated Press and United Press International named him second-team All-Big Ten. The 1958 Badgers were 7–1–1, and finished the season ranked seventh nationally by the AP.

In 1959, Hackbart was troubled with a leg injury during the season. He was the starting quarterback that season, completing 40 of 83 passes for 589 yards and two passing touchdowns. He also rushed for 365 yards on 98 carries. Hackbart's six rushing touchdowns led the Big Ten that year. In 1959, Hackbart led the Big Ten in total offense; was selected second-team All-Big Ten by the Associated Press and was recognized as first-team All-Big Ten that year by the Big Ten; and was a first-team Academic All-American. United Press International named him a second-team All American.

The Badgers were 7–3 and won their first sole Big Ten championship in since 1912. The AP ranked them sixth nationally at the end of the season. The Badgers were overwhelmed by the Washington Huskies in the 1960 Rose Bowl, 44–8. After that game, the Badgers' head coach Milt Bruhn identified Hackbart as the only Badger who played a good game.

Hackbart was also an outfielder on the Badgers' baseball team. He had a .273 batting average as a junior (1959), and led the Big Ten in stolen bases (13). Hackbart had bonus offers from Major League Baseball teams after his junior year, but he chose to return for his senior year to compete for the Badgers' football team. After an excellent start to the 1960 spring baseball season, he suffered an ankle injury and ended with a .317 batting average as a senior. He did not give the ankle injury proper rest and attention and it continued to hinder him for the next two years; during his short baseball career and during his first two seasons in professional football.

Hackbart also played for the Badgers' basketball team. In May 1960, he was named the University of Wisconsin's athlete of the year. He later obtained a Master's Degree from the University of Wisconsin.

== Professional career ==
=== Football draft ===
The Green Bay Packers selected Hackbart in the fifth round of the 1960 NFL draft, 51st overall. He also was selected by the Minneapolis-St. Paul franchise of the new American Football League (AFL) with its first territorial pick in the 1960 AFL draft; the league's first draft, held in November 1959. That franchise withdrew from the AFL less than two months later, and instead joined the NFL as an expansion team in 1960 as the Minnesota Vikings.

In the spring of 1960, Hackbart was also pursued by future Pro Football Hall of Fame head coach Bud Grant of the Winnipeg Blue Bombers to join his team in the Canadian Football League. Hackbart chose to sign with Vince Lombardi and the Green Bay Packers, rather than Grant and the Blue Bombers; but his contract with the Packers included a clause that it would be deemed void if he chose to play professional baseball.

=== Professional baseball ===
Hackbart had a tryout with Major League Baseball's Pittsburgh Pirates in the spring of 1960. Hackbart signed a bonus contract with the Pirates in June 1960. He was assigned to play in North Dakota with the Class C Grand Forks Chiefs of the Northern League. At the time he was married and the father of one child. He played with Grand Forks in 1960, principally as a first baseman. He had a .252 batting average in 290 at bats, with six home runs, eight triples, 13 doubles, 36 runs batted in and 36 runs scored, along with a .717 OPS (on-base plus slugging).

=== Green Bay Packers ===
The Winnipeg Goldeyes were one of the Northern League's teams. When the Chiefs played in Winnipeg, Bud Grant met with Hackbart. Grant eventually convinced Hackbart to play for the Blue Bombers. When Lombardi learned about this, he sent the Packers' personnel director Jack Vainisi to meet with Hackbart. Vainisi met with Hackbart in a restaurant. He presented Hackbart with a contract and said Hackbart had to sign with the Packers because Hackbart had a contract with the Packers and was obligated to sign with him.

After trying to explain that was not the case, Hackbart realized Vainisi had made arrangements so that Vainisi could make a telephone call from the restaurant to Lombardi, with whom Hackbart had never spoken. Vainisi put Lombardi on the telephone line with Hackbart. Lombardi reiterated to Hackbart that the Packers had drafted Hackbart and Hackbart had to sign with the Packers. Hackbart later recalled that Lombardi said something to the effect of "Baseball players are (pansies) and football players are men. What do you want to be?" Hackbart felt he could not turn Lombardi down and then sat down with Vainisi and signed the Packers' contract.

Hackbart joined the Packers in early September 1960. He was a reserve defensive back in 1960, starting one game. Before the 1961 season, Lombardi saw Hackbart as possibly having the potential to help the team more in the defensive backfield that season. In the second game of the 1961 season against the San Francisco 49ers, Hackbart was playing on special teams. After the Packers' Willie Wood returned a punt for a touchdown, one of the officials told Packers' defensive coach Phil Bengston he could have called a penalty on Hackbart that would have negated the touchdown, and Bengston began berating Hackbart. Hackbart used foul language towards Bengston in response. The next day, they looked at game film and saw that Hackbart had not committed the alleged penalty. Bengston apologized to Hackbart and Hackbart apologized for using untoward language at Bengston. After practice that day, Hackbart was soon deflated and depressed when Lombardi called Hackbart into his office and said "I just traded you to the Washington Redskins. Can you make it?".

=== Washington Redskins ===
On September 26, 1961, two days after the incident with Bengston, Lombardi traded Hackbart for an undisclosed draft choice. Five days later Hackbart was Washington's starting right cornerback against the New York Giants. He intercepted a Charlie Conerly pass and returned it 48 yards for a touchdown. In a November game against the Dallas Cowboys, now starting at safety, Hackbart intercepted a pass and returned it 33 yards for a touchdown. He was later ejected from that game for fighting. Hackbart started nine games for Washington that season, at cornerback and strong safety, with six interceptions in total. During the season, Hackbart said he was happy to have been traded to Washington because it gave him the opportunity to be a starter.

The Packers won the 1961 NFL championship in December 1961, by which time Hackbart had been on Washington for months. On October 2, 2011, the Packers held a halftime ceremony at Lambeau Field in Green Bay, Wisconsin honoring the 50th anniversary of the 1961 championship team. Hackbart was among the 18 players the Packers included as among the alumni of that championship team to be honored.

In 1962, Hackbart started nine games for Washington, playing mostly at free safety. He had three interceptions and four fumble recoveries in 1962. Washington used Hackbart to blitz from his safety position that season, and he had 1.5 quarterback sacks. He helped secure an October win over the Philadelphia Eagles, 27–21, when he intercepted a Sonny Jurgensen pass in the endzone late in the fourth quarter. On special teams, Hackbart blocked a Lou Groza field goal attempt in a September 23 game against the Cleveland Browns, in a 17–16 win for Washington. In a September 30 victory over the St. Louis Cardinals, 24–14, Hackbart had an interception, two fumble recoveries, and a four-yard tackle for loss against Joe Childress stopping the Cardinals' offense on a fourth down and one yard play.

Hackbart started 13 games in 1963, playing both safety positions. He had one interception and two quarterback sacks. Hackbart suffered a separated shoulder during an intrasquad game in the 1964 preseason, and missed the entire 1964 season. He was replaced by future Hall of Fame safety Paul Krause and Tom Walters in the team's exhibition games that year. Washington waived Hackbart before the start of the 1964 season, and he was replaced by Krause at free safety during the 1964 season.

=== Winnipeg Blue Bombers and Minnesota Vikings ===
Hackbart tried out with the Minnesota Vikings as a free agent in 1965, but did not make the team. The Vikings were coached by Norm Van Brocklin at that time. A few days after being cut by the Vikings, Hackbart signed with the Winnipeg Blue Bombers in the Canadian Football League. He went on to play six games at defensive back with the Blue Bombers in 1965; with the team still being coached by Bud Grant. Hackbart joined the Vikings' taxi squad at the end of the 1965 season.

Hackbart tried out again for the Vikings in 1966. He made the team, and Van Brocklin started Hackbart at free safety in all 14 games that season. Hackbart had five interceptions that year, returning one interception 41 yards for a touchdown in a November game against the Detroit Lions. Hackbart was an honorable mention at safety on United Press International's 1966 NFL All-Star Team.

In 1967, Bud Grant took over as the Vikings' head coach from Van Brocklin. At the time Grant came on, Hackbart was the only Viking with whom he was personally familiar. In 1967, Hackbart started 13 games at free safety with two interceptions and one quarterback sack. He once again returned an interception for a touchdown, a 21-yard return in an October game against the Cardinals. This was the fourth and final interception return for a touchdown in Hackbart's career.

Hackbart played three more seasons with the Vikings (1968 to 1970), but did not start any games. In July 1968, the Vikings traded Marlin McKeever and a draft choice to the Washington Redskins for Paul Krause; who had replaced Hackbart once before, in 1964. Krause went on to become the Vikings' starting free safety from 1968 to 1977. Hackbart became known as a "sticker" on the Vikings' kickoff and punt coverage special teams, because of his hard hitting, "crunching tackles" and dynamic style of heading to meet the other teams' punt or kickoff returners. The Vikings also used Hackbart as an extra defensive back or linebacker on obvious passing downs. He played in that defensive role for the Vikings in Super Bowl IV, a 23–7 loss to the Kansas City Chiefs. The Vikings waived Hackbart before the start of the 1971 season, but kept him on their taxi squad.

=== St. Louis Cardinals and Denver Broncos ===
Shortly after putting Hackbart on their taxi squad, the Vikings traded Hackbart, Mike McGill and a future draft choice to the St. Louis Cardinals for Bob Brown and Nate Wright. Hackbart started six games for the Cardinals as a defensive back over the next two seasons (1971 and 1972), sometimes filling in for an injured Larry Wilson at safety; while continuing to play special teams. He had two interceptions during that time.

In July 1973, the Cardinals traded Hackbart to the Denver Broncos for a future draft choice. He played in only three games that season, starting two. Hackbart started the season's first game at free safety against the Cincinnati Bengals. He is reported to have suffered an undiagnosed neck fracture after the Bengal's 6 ft 2 in (1.88 m) 245 lb (111 kg) fullback Boobie Clark, playing in his first NFL game, hit Hackbart in the back of the neck in the aftermath of an interception return. Hackbart stayed in that game and played in two more games. Hackbart's play deteriorated in the ensuing two weeks due to the injury, and the Broncos waived him after the third game of the season. No other team signed him. Only after seeking medical treatment subsequent to his waiver did Hackbart learn that he had a fractured neck.

During his 12-year NFL career, Hackbart played in 152 games, starting 67, with 19 interceptions and 6.5 quarterback sacks.

== Legacy and honors ==
Hackbart was known for both his hard-hitting style of play as well as his sense of humor. After intercepting a pass thrown by the Pittsburgh Steeler's Terry Bradshaw, when he saw Bradshaw coming to tackle him, Hackbart ran straight at Bradshaw to deliver a blow to the quarterback, even though Hackbart was now in an offensive posture.

In 1999, Hackbart was listed as the 39th best athlete in the University of Wisconsin's history on its all-century list of the school's best athletes. Hackbart was inducted into the University of Wisconsin Athletics Hall of Fame in 1996. In 1983, he was inducted into the Madison Pen and Mike Club-Bowman Sports Foundation Hall of Fame. He received the Big Ten Medal of Honor in 1960.

=== Boobie Clark litigation ===
In 1975, Hackbart initiated a lawsuit seeking money damages against Clark and the Bengals for Clark's alleged negligence and recklessness in the manner in which he hit Hackbart during the 1973 game, resulting in injury to Hackbart. Judge Richard Matsch of the United States District Court for the District of Colorado found that Clark had acted out of anger and frustration in intentionally striking Hackbart, but did not have a specific intent to injure Hackbart. Judge Matsch, however, dismissed Hackbart's suit on the basis that "the level of violence and frequency of emotional outbursts in NFL football games are such that Dale Hackbart must have recognized and accepted the risk he would be injured by such an act as committed by Clark".

Hackbart successfully appealed the district court's decision. In 1979, the United States Court of Appeals for the Tenth Circuit reversed Judge Matsch in Hackbart v. Cincinnati Bengals, Inc., 601 F.2d 516 (10th Cir. 1979), certiorari denied, 100 S. Ct. 275 (1979). The appellate court found that there was no basis in the law for the establishing a principle that the general roughness of an activity can entirely preclude the possibility of finding that a person can be compensated with money damages for a tortious intentional act occurring during that rough activity. The United States Supreme Court denied certiorari, thus allowing Hackbart's lawsuit to proceed. The 10th Circuit's legal opinion has been used in law schools in teaching tort law, and has been the subject of academic scholarship. Hackbart's case was remanded for further proceedings, and was later resolved outside of court in 1981, via a financial settlement in an undisclosed amount.

On the facts underlying Hackbart's lawsuit, it has been reported that Hackbart was kneeling near the sideline on one knee, watching the opposite side of the field where an interception return and end of the play were taking place. Five seconds after the play had been ended by the officials, while Hackbart was still kneeling in repose, Clark hit Hackbart in the back of the neck with his forearm. It also has been reported that Clark subsequently admitted he hit Hackbart in the back of the neck out of frustration and anger because the Bengals' were losing the game. Hackbart suffered three broken vertebrae, and had muscular atrophy in an arm, a shoulder, and his back. In the lawsuit, the lawyers for Clark and the Bengals had alleged that Hackbart was hurt a few minutes earlier during another play.

Hackbart has been purported to have said, "It was just before halftime and the Bengals had the ball at around the 45 yard line going in. Boobie Clark came out of a split backfield and ran down the hash marks. I was playing free safety so I dropped back to the center of the field. The ball went up in the air and I converged into the endzone. Billy Thompson, who was playing left corner for the Broncos, jumped in front of me and Boobie Clark and intercepted the pass. I tried to block Boobie and landed on the ground. When I came up on to one knee watching Thompson run the ball, Boobie came up from behind me and whacked me in the back of the head, with a right fore-arm and drove me into the ground, after the Play was finished. My left arm went numb! At halftime in the locker room I couldn’t take off my helmet so I was packed in ice around my neck and helmet."

Hackbart did not at the time report the happening to his coaches or to anyone else during the game. However, because of the pain which he experienced he was unable to play golf the next day. He did not seek medical attention, but the continued pain caused him to report this fact and the incident to the Bronco trainer who gave him treatment. He played on the special teams for the next two games, but after that the Broncos released him on waivers. He sought medical help and it was then that X-rays were taken, which revealed that the C4, 5, 6, and 7 vertebrae on his neck were fractured. This injury ended his football career.

In 1974, neurosurgeons told Hackbart that if he did not have surgery to repair the damage, he would lose use of his left arm, shoulder, and any muscles involved with the damaged vertebrae. The Broncos claimed they were not liable. Hackbart hired an attorney, Roger Johnson of Johnson & Mahony, and brought a suit against the Bengals.

== Personal life ==
While out with an injury for the 1964 season, Hackbart and his family lived in Madison, Wisconsin, where he sold insurance and pursued a Master's Degree at the University of Wisconsin. After his career, Hackbart moved to Niwot, Colorado with his wife Beverly (Culp) Hackbart and three children, and was in the janitorial supplies business. They also lived in Boulder, Colorado.

In late 1998, Hackbart was diagnosed with breast cancer. He was originally told he had a 40 percent chance of survival. Because the disease is less common in men, it often is detected too late for effective treatment, but Hackbart's cancer was detected before the disease had progressed into the rest of his body. He underwent a radical mastectomy and subsequent drug treatment (tamoxifen), and his prognosis improved to an 80 percent chance of survival. Hackbart became a spokesman in the Denver area for the Susan G. Komen Breast Cancer Foundation, and also spoke publicly about his cancer story in his hometown of Madison. At the time he worked for the Bridgestone–Firestone company as a national mine manager. Beverly Hackbart died in early 2000 of a heart attack while hiking in New Mexico.
