= John Nocera =

American football player (1934–1981)

No. 29, 33
- Position: Linebacker

Personal information
- Born: May 4, 1934; Youngstown, Ohio, U.S.
- Died: May 17, 1981 (aged 47); Youngstown, Ohio, U.S.
- Listed height: 6 ft 1 in (1.85 m)
- Listed weight: 220 lb (100 kg)

Career information
- High school: Rayen (Youngstown)
- College: Iowa
- NFL draft: 1957: 16th round, 182nd overall pick

Career history
- Philadelphia Eagles (1959–1962); Denver Broncos (1963)

Awards and highlights
- NFL champion (1960); National champion (1958)

Career NFL/AFL statistics
- Interceptions: 1
- Fumble recoveries: 4
- Sacks: 0.5
- Stats at Pro Football Reference

John Nocera (May 4, 1934 – May 17, 1981) was an American professional football player who was a linebacker for five seasons for the Philadelphia Eagles and Denver Broncos.
