= 1958 Purdue Boilermakers football team =

American college football season

1958 Purdue Boilermakers football
- Conference: Big Ten Conference

Ranking
- Coaches: No. 11
- AP: No. 13
- Record: 6–1–2 (3–1–2 Big Ten)
- Head coach: Jack Mollenkopf (3rd season)
- MVP: Tom Franckhauser
- Captains: Tom Franckhauser; Gene Selawski
- Home stadium: Ross–Ade Stadium

1958 Big Ten Conference football standings
	Conf.					Overall
Team	W		L		T	W		L		T
No. 2 Iowa $	5	–	1	–	0	8	–	1	–	1
No. 7 Wisconsin	5	–	1	–	1	7	–	1	–	1
No. 8 Ohio State	4	–	1	–	2	6	–	1	–	2
No. 13 Purdue	3	–	1	–	2	6	–	1	–	2
Indiana	3	–	2	–	1	5	–	3	–	1
Illinois	4	–	3	–	0	4	–	5	–	0
Northwestern	3	–	4	–	0	5	–	4	–	0
Michigan	1	–	5	–	1	2	–	6	–	1
Minnesota	1	–	6	–	0	1	–	8	–	0
Michigan State	0	–	5	–	1	3	–	5	–	1
$ – Conference champion; Rankings from AP Poll

The 1958 Purdue Boilermakers football team was an American football team that represented Purdue University during the 1958 Big Ten Conference football season In their third season under head coach Jack Mollenkopf, the Boilermakers compiled a 6–1–2 record, finished in fourth place in the Big Ten Conference with a 3–1–2 record against conference opponents, and outscored opponents by a total of 184 to 102.

Purdue tackle Gene Selawski was selected by the Football Writers Association of America as a first-team All-American in 1958. End Tom Franckhauser was selected as a first-team All-American by the Central Press Association. Other notable players included quarterbacks Bob Spoo and Ross Fichtner, fullback Bob Jarus, and guard Ron Maltony.

== Schedule ==
Date	Opponent	Rank	Site	Result	Attendance	Source
September 27	Nebraska*		Ross–Ade Stadium; West Lafayette, IN	W 28–0	42,914	
October 4	at Rice*	No. 14	Rice Stadium; Houston, TX	W 24–0	41,000	
October 11	at No. 6 Wisconsin	No. 13	Camp Randall Stadium; Madison, WI	L 6–31	51,028	
October 18	No. 5 Michigan State		Ross–Ade Stadium; West Lafayette, IN	W 14–6	48,468	
October 25	at No. 11 Notre Dame*	No. 15	Notre Dame Stadium; Notre Dame, IN (rivalry)	W 29–22	59,563	
November 1	Illinois^{†}	No. 10	Ross–Ade Stadium; West Lafayette, IN (rivalry)	W 31–8	46,357	
November 8	at No. 16 Ohio State	No. 8	Ohio Stadium; Columbus, OH	T 14–14	83,481	
November 15	at No. 13 Northwestern	No. 8	Dyche Stadium; Evanston, IL	W 23–6	38,421	
November 22	Indiana	No. 8	Ross–Ade Stadium; West Lafayette, IN (Old Oaken Bucket)	T 15–15	43,507	
*Non-conference game; ^{†}Homecoming; Rankings from AP Poll released prior to the game; Source:

== Roster ==
1958 Purdue Boilermakers football team roster
Players
Coaches
Offense

Pos.	#	Name	Class
QB		Bob Spoo
QB		Bernie Allen
HB		Albert Bader
HB		Tom Barnett
OT		Jerry Beabout
OT		Bob Becker
C		Butch Becker
G		Fred Brandel
E		Rich Brooks
G		John Ciccone
OT		Thomas Ciukaj
E		Ed Dwyer
E		Alfred Espinda
E		Ed Evans
QB		Ross Fichtner
G		Harv Hostetler
FB		Len Jardine
FB		Bob Jarus
QB		Wayne Jones
C		Sam Joyner
C		Phil Kardasz
G		Phil Kuebbeler
HB		Joe Kulbacki
FB		Jack Laraway
G		Russ Maier
G		Ron Maltony
E		Dan Mason
HB		Dick Mayoras
C		Dan McGrew
HB		Dick Ohl
G		Skip Ohl
FB		Jim Redinger
OT		Dale Rems
OT		Gene Selawski
C		Terry Sheehan
HB		Jim Tiller
G		Emory Turner
HB		Clyde Washington
HB		Len Wilson

Defense

Pos.	#	Name	Class

Special teams

Pos.	#	Name	Class

Head coach

- Jack Mollenkopf

Coordinators/assistant coaches

Legend

- (C) Team captain
- (S) Suspended
- (I) Ineligible
- Injured
- Redshirt
