= 1958 Minnesota Golden Gophers football team =

American college football season

1958 Minnesota Golden Gophers football
- Conference: Big Ten Conference
- Record: 1–8 (1–6 Big Ten)
- Head coach: Murray Warmath (5th season)
- MVP: Everette Gerths
- Captain: Mike Svendsen
- Home stadium: Memorial Stadium

1958 Big Ten Conference football standings
	Conf.					Overall
Team	W		L		T	W		L		T
No. 2 Iowa $	5	–	1	–	0	8	–	1	–	1
No. 7 Wisconsin	5	–	1	–	1	7	–	1	–	1
No. 8 Ohio State	4	–	1	–	2	6	–	1	–	2
No. 13 Purdue	3	–	1	–	2	6	–	1	–	2
Indiana	3	–	2	–	1	5	–	3	–	1
Illinois	4	–	3	–	0	4	–	5	–	0
Northwestern	3	–	4	–	0	5	–	4	–	0
Michigan	1	–	5	–	1	2	–	6	–	1
Minnesota	1	–	6	–	0	1	–	8	–	0
Michigan State	0	–	5	–	1	3	–	5	–	1
$ – Conference champion; Rankings from AP Poll

The 1958 Minnesota Golden Gophers football team represented the University of Minnesota in the 1958 Big Ten Conference football season. In their fifth year under head coach Murray Warmath, the Golden Gophers compiled a 1–8 record and were outscored by their opponents by a combined total of 157 to 115.

Guard Everette Gerths received the team's Most Valuable Player award. Center Mike Svendsen was named All-Big Ten first team. Svendsen and offensive lineman Perry Gehring were named Academic All-Big Ten.

Total attendance at five home games was 288,817, an average of 57,763 per game. The largest crowd was against Iowa.

== Schedule ==
Date	Opponent	Site	Result	Attendance	Source
September 27	at Washington*	Husky Stadium; Seattle, WA	L 21–24	38,000	
October 4	No. 12 Pittsburgh*	Memorial Stadium; Minneapolis, MN	L 7–13	56,450	
October 11	Northwestern	Memorial Stadium; Minneapolis, MN	L 3–7	56,061	
October 18	Illinois^{†}	Memorial Stadium; Minneapolis, MN	L 8–20	58,174	
October 25	at Michigan	Michigan Stadium; Ann Arbor, MI (Little Brown Jug)	L 19–20	72,981	
November 1	at Indiana	Memorial Stadium; Bloomington, IN	L 0–6	25,000	
November 8	No. 2 Iowa	Memorial Stadium; Minneapolis, MN (rivalry)	L 6–28	64,485	
November 15	Michigan State	Memorial Stadium; Minneapolis, MN	W 39–12	53,647	
November 22	at No. 5 Wisconsin	Camp Randall Stadium; Madison, WI (rivalry)	L 12–27	54,517	
*Non-conference game; ^{†}Homecoming; Rankings from AP Poll released prior to the game; Source:
