= Rich Kreitling =

American football player (1936–2020)

- Kreitling with the Cleveland Browns in 1959

No. 83, 88, 82
- Position: End

Personal information
- Born: March 13, 1936; Chicago, Illinois, U.S.
- Died: May 9, 2020 (aged 84); Cannon Falls, Minnesota, U.S.
- Listed height: 6 ft 2 in (1.88 m)
- Listed weight: 208 lb (94 kg)

Career information
- High school: Fenger Academy (Chicago)
- College: Auburn (1955); Illinois (1957-1958)
- NFL draft: 1959: 1st round, 11th overall pick

Career history
- Cleveland Browns (1959–1963); Chicago Bears (1964)

Awards and highlights
- Second-team All-American (1958); First-team All-Big Ten (1958)

Career NFL statistics
- Receptions: 123
- Receiving yards: 1,775
- Receiving touchdowns: 17
- Stats at Pro Football Reference

Richard Allen Kreitling (March 13, 1936 – May 9, 2020) was an American professional football player who was a wide receiver in the National Football League (NFL), primarily with the Cleveland Browns.

== Early life ==
Rich Kreitling was born March 13, 1936, in Chicago, Illinois. He attended Fenger High School on the city's South side. Under the limited-substitution rules of the day, players generally played both offensively and defensively, with the 6'2" Kreitling lining up at end on offense and as a safety on the defensive side of the ball.

He was a star on the Fenger football team, catching 10 touchdown passes as a senior in helping to lead the 1954 Titans squad to South-Central City League title with an 8–1 record. The Titans overwhelmed their opponents throughout the season, racking up 336 points to their opponents' 27, and Kreitling was one of four Fenger starters selected to the City League All-Star team by its 37 coaches in December. He was also one of eleven players tapped by the Southtown Economist newspaper for the South Chicago All-Star first team, which included members of public, private, and Catholic high schools.

After graduating from high school, Kreitling enlisted in the US Army National Guard, in which he served for five years before gaining his honorable discharge.

== College career ==
Kreitling was regarded as one of the top prospects at his position and he was courted by multiple schools to play collegiately. Among these were the Auburn University Tigers, an Alabama school concentrating on Chicagoland as a rich area for potential recruits. In January 1955, Kreitling accepted an athletic scholarship offer from Auburn, becoming the fourth Chicago-area player so signed for the Fall 1955 season.

Due to NCAA regulations, freshman were prohibited from playing varsity football during this era so Kreitling spent 1955 on the Auburn freshman team. He acquitted himself well and as a future sophomore in 1956 spring practice, he was regarded by coaches as a promising candidate to make an impact on the Tigers varsity squad that coming fall.

Kreitling's Auburn career proved short-lived. In 1956 he transferred back home to his native state to attend the University of Illinois, where he spent 1956 on that school's freshman team. For a second straight year, this time in 1957, Kreitling would see the approach of football season as a highly touted sophomore. "Kreitling was considered best prospect on the freshman team last year and he looks like a sure bet for stardom," one reporter opined. Kreitling would make the fourth member of his Fenger High School team to play for head coach Ray Eliot and the Fighting Illini in 1957.

By the time the 1957 season kicked off, the "fleet sophomore" Kreitling had managed to win a starting place at wide receiver on the Illinois team. Kreitling got off to a hot start, leading the Illinois squad in pass receiving, but would sustain a back injury that caused him to lose more than a week of practice and miss the team's game against Michigan State, a 19–14 loss.

Illinois would finish the 1957 on a strong note, winning two of three games, including a one-point win over Michigan and a 27–0 shellacking of Northwestern, but the team's overall record of 4 wins and 5 losses was disappointing. Despite a painful rib injury, Kreitling would finish the season with 12 catches for 203 yards and two touchdowns.

The 1958 season began poorly for Illinois, with the Illini dropping three games in a row to start the year. An October 17 game against the Minnesota Golden Gophers helped right the ship, however. Against Minnesota junior quarterback Bob Hickey connected on two massive touchdown strikes to Kreitling — good for 83 and 66 yards respectively

This performance was topped three weeks later against Michigan, in which Kreitling pulled down touchdown passes of 83, 60, and 14 yards, earning him Midwest Lineman of the Week honors from United Press International and vaulting him into the All-America hunt. Head coach Eliot, a veteran of 17 college football seasons at the helm at Illinois, was impressed enough of his junior receiver to proclaim him "the best offensive end I've had — he's got great hands." Opposing coach Bennie Oosterbaan of Michigan was similarly laudatory, characterizing Kreitling in three words as "excellent, dangerous, deceptive" and noting that his three touchdown catches had come despite having "worked on pass defense all week" and having "had two men assigned to him."

In the middle of November, Kreitling found himself in the unusual position of leading the entire nation in pass receiving, with 616 yards gained — topping the second best showing by Dave Hibbert of Arizona by 142 yards — but being ineligible for listing by the NCAA's statistical bureau by virtue of having caught only 18 passes on the year instead of the required 21 catches or more.

Kreitling would be named a third team All-American by the Associated Press, joined by future NFLers Joe Kapp of Cal, Alex Hawkins of South Carolina, and Nick Pietrosante of Notre Dame.

Despite Illinois again finishing with a pedestrian 4–5 record, Kreitling would finish the year with 19 catches for 570 yards and 5 touchdowns in Big Ten Conference action and would shatter the NCAA record by averaging 31.8 yards per reception on the year. Kreitling had begun to attract national notice and it was already assumed he would forgo his final year of college eligibility in favor of the NFL.

== Professional career ==
Kreitling was drafted by the Cleveland Browns in the first round of the 1959 NFL draft, with the club making him the 11th pick overall. The Browns' calculation that Kreitling would leave college before his football eligibility had expired proved well founded, and in June 1959, Kreitling inked a contract with the team. "After careful consideration my parents and I decided I should enter pro football this fall," said the 6'2" receiver at the time of his signing. "I've had my normal four years of college and we feel it is in my best interest to join the Browns." Kreitling indicated that he had turned down multiple offers from Canadian football teams in favor of playing for Cleveland in the United States.

Kreitling near the end of his playing career in 1964.

Head coach and general manager of the Browns, Paul Brown, was pleased, telling a reporter that Kreitling "was reported to be the fastest man at Illinois last year and he gives us another link in our desire to have more speed at offensive end."

One who was not pleased was his former head coach at Illinois, Ray Eliot, getting ready for his final season with the Illini. "Only last Saturday, Kreitling told me he intended to continue school this fall," Eliot complained. "The Browns also assured me they would wait for him. It's hard to know whom to believe any more."

Kreitling saw action in all 12 games of his 1959 rookie season, but was not involved in the team's passing game.

He made his way into Paul Brown's starting lineup in 1960, becoming the team's regular split end. He made 16 catches during the 12 game season, gaining 316 yards and scoring three touchdowns — including a 69 yard grab that would prove to be the longest pass play of his career.

In 1961, Kreitling was dinged by injury and managed 11 starts out of the 14 game slate. He managed to catch 21 balls for three touchdowns, but gained just 229 yards on the year.

The 1962 season would be Kreitling's most productive of his professional career, as he grabbed 44 balls for 659 yards and his usual three scores.

Kreitling's fifth season with the Browns, 1963, saw diminished output in terms of quantity from the high-water mark of the previous year, with the wide receiver catching just 22 balls for 386 yards. An impressive six of these catches were for touchdowns, however.

The Browns would use the 11th pick of the first round of the 1964 NFL draft to select a new wide receiver — future Hall of Famer Paul Warfield, out of Ohio State University. This highly-lauded arrival had the effect of making Rich Kreitling's place on the Cleveland roster expendable. On June 25th the shoe dropped, and Kreitling was dealt to the Chicago Bears for taxi squad defensive back Lowell Caylor and 2nd and 3rd round draft picks in the 1965 draft.

As the starting left end for the Bears, Kreitling catch 20 passes for just 185 yards and accounting for two touchdowns. It would be his last year in the league. Battling injuries to his knee and shoulder and facing competition for playing time, Kreitling announced his retirement from football in August 1965 at the age of 29.

== Life after football ==
In 1970, balloting of Illinois students, alumni, and fans saw the election of Kreitling to the Illini All-Time Eleven first team. Joining him on the list were Illinois legends Red Grange, Dick Butkus, Buddy Young, and others.

In his final years, Kreitling split his time between his home in Hastings, Minnesota, and a winter residence in Clearwater, Florida.

Kreitling died on May 9, 2020, after an extended illness. He was 84 years old at the time of his death.
