= Tom Maudlin =

American football player

No. 15, 11
- Positions: Quarterback, defensive back

Personal information
- Born: July 28, 1936 (age 89); Los Angeles, California, U.S.
- Listed height: 6 ft 2 in (1.88 m)
- Listed weight: 175 lb (79 kg)

Career information
- High school: North Hollywood High School
- College: Menlo JC (1955–1956); USC Trojans (1957–1958)

Career history
- 1962: Los Angeles Rams*
- 1962: Toronto Argonauts
- 1963: Montreal Alouettes
- 1963: Edmonton Eskimos
- * Offseason and/or practice squad member only

Warren Thomas Maudlin Jr. (born July 28, 1936) is a retired American gridiron football player who played quarterback for the Menlo Oaks, USC Trojans, Toronto Argonauts, and Edmonton Eskimos.

== Early life ==
Maudlin was born on born July 28, 1936 to Warren Thomas and Elizabeth (Rowe) Maudlin. His father was a three-year letterman in football at the University of Montana. His maternal grandfather, J. P. Rowe, was a noted geologist and author.

== College football ==
An all-city quarterback at North Hollywood High School, Maudlin transferred to the University of Southern California after two seasons at Menlo Junior College. He entered the 1957 season as the second-string quarterback behind Jim Conroy, but split the starting role with Willie Wood after Conroy was moved to fullback. He completed 48 of 100 passes for 552 yards, no touchdowns, and eight interceptions. In 1958, he completed 41 of 95 passes for 535 yards, 4 touchdowns, and a Pacific Coast Conference leading 15 interceptions. Maudlin also played defensive back and led the team in pass deflections (10) and fumbles recovered (2) in 1958.

== United States Marine Corps ==
After graduating from USC, Maudlin entered the United States Marines Corps. He was the starting quarterback for the Quantico Marines Devil Dogs football team in 1959 and 1960. He helped lead them to an undefeated season in 1959, including a 90–0 victory over McClellan Air Force Base in the Shrimp Bowl. In 1960, he was named most valuable player by the Navy Times. In 1961, he played for the Marine Corps Recruit Depot San Diego team.

== Professional football ==
Maudlin signed with the National Football League's Los Angeles Rams on July 6, 1962. He was waived by the club on September 4, 1962. He signed with the Toronto Argonauts of the Canadian Football League shortly thereafter and became the second-string quarterback following the retirement of Tom Dublinski. He saw limited playing time behind Tobin Rote, completing his only pass attempt for 12 yards and rushing once for two yards.

On August 5, 1963, Maudlin was traded to the Montreal Alouettes for linebacker Dick Schnell. He competed with Ed Chlebek for the backup quarterback job. He was cut by the team following the season opener. On August 27, he signed with the Edmonton Eskimos. He saw increased playing time in Edmonton, completing 18 of 40 passes for 261 yards, 1 touchdown, and 8 interceptions. His 6 interceptions in Edmonton's September 7 game against the Saskatchewan Roughriders remains a franchise record.

== Later life ==
In 1964, Maudlin returned to California and began working in real estate. After working for his father's company, he started his own business in 1967.
