= Rex Johnston =

American baseball player (1937–2019)

- Outfielder
- Born: November 8, 1937; Colton, California, U.S.
- Died: December 15, 2019 (aged 82); Los Angeles, California, U.S.
- Batted: Switch Threw: Right

MLB debut
- April 15, 1964, for the Pittsburgh Pirates

Last MLB appearance
- May 11, 1964, for the Pittsburgh Pirates

MLB statistics
- Batting average: .000
- At bats: 7
- Runs scored: 1
- Stats at Baseball Reference

Teams
- Pittsburgh Pirates (1964)

Rex David Johnston (November 8, 1937 – December 15, 2019) was an American professional athlete who played Major League Baseball for the Pittsburgh Pirates and in the National Football League (NFL) for the Pittsburgh Steelers. He is the only athlete to have played for both of Pittsburgh's iconic baseball and football teams. He attended the University of Southern California, where he played both sports, standing 6 feet 1 inch (1.85 m) tall and weighing 202 pounds (92 kg) during his active career.

== Ten games with 1964 Pirates ==
A switch-hitting outfielder who threw right-handed, Johnston signed with the Pirates in 1959 and spent five full seasons in Pittsburgh's minor league system before making the Bucs' varsity out of spring training in 1964. MLB teams were then allowed to carry three extra players on their roster for the first 30 days of the season, and Johnston appeared in 14 games as a leftfielder, centerfielder, pinch hitter and pinch runner between April 15 and May 11. He logged ten plate appearances and drew three bases on balls, but went hitless in seven at bats. In his only Major League start, as a centerfielder on May 2 against the St. Louis Cardinals at Busch Stadium, Johnston came to the plate five times against southpaws Curt Simmons and Bobby Shantz; he walked once, reached on an error, and grounded out three times. His baseball career continued at the Triple-A level through 1966, and he batted .266 with 59 home runs in 938 minor league games.

== Time with Steelers ==
Johnston played halfback in college for USC. In 1960, when he was struggling as a baseball player at the Class C level in the Pirates' system, he was invited to try out for the NFL Steelers. According to the Pittsburgh Post-Gazette, Johnston called Branch Rickey, Jr., the Pirates' farm system director, seeking permission to play pro football as well as baseball. "I'll never forget what he said: 'Rex, I look at your stats every day. If you've got something else to do, you'd better do it,'" Johnston recalled in 2004. Ironically, Johnston immediately started hitting, was promoted twice to Class B and Class A, and ended the season batting a respectable .275 before reporting to the Steelers late in training camp. Johnston played the full, 12-game NFL schedule for the 1960 Steelers, almost exclusively as a kickoff and punt returner. He averaged 21.8 yards in 18 kickoff returns (longest 38 yards) and 3.8 yards in 12 punt returns (longest 14 yards) and scored no touchdowns. As a halfback, he carried four times for 12 yards. It was his only season in pro football.

As of 2004, Johnston was heading his family's industrial painting business in Paramount, California. He died from heart failure in Los Angeles on December 15, 2019, at age 82.
