= Dick Teteak =

American football player and coach (born 1936)

Biographical details
- Born: December 30, 1936; Oshkosh, Wisconsin, U.S.

Playing career

Football
- 1955–1958: Wisconsin
- Position: Guard

Coaching career (HC unless noted)

Football
- 1962–1967: Beloit (assistant)
- 1968–1969: Beloit
- 1970–1975: Wisconsin (assistant)

Baseball
- 1964–1967: Beloit

Head coaching record
- Overall: 3–14 (football); 8–29 (baseball)

Accomplishments and honors

Awards
- First-team All-Big Ten (1958)

Richard Teteak (born December 30, 1936) is an American former football player and coach. He was selected in the 15th round by the Green Bay Packers in the 1959 NFL draft. Teteak served as the head football coach at Beloit College in Beloit, Wisconsin from 1968 to 1969, compiling a record of 3–14.
