= Sam Williams (defensive lineman) =

American football player (1931–2013)

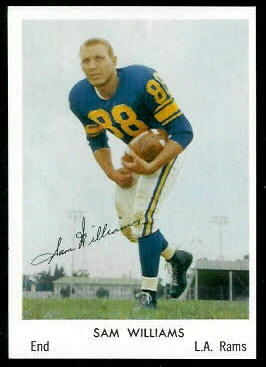
- Williams in 1959

No. 88, 85
- Positions: Defensive end, end, linebacker

Personal information
- Born: March 9, 1931; Dansville, Michigan, U.S.
- Died: April 25, 2013 (aged 82); Livonia, Michigan, U.S.
- Listed height: 6 ft 5 in (1.96 m)
- Listed weight: 235 lb (107 kg)

Career information
- High school: Dansville
- College: Michigan State
- NFL draft: 1956: 24th round, 288th overall pick

Career history
- Los Angeles Rams (1959); Detroit Lions (1960–1965); Atlanta Falcons (1966–1967)

Awards and highlights
- Consensus All-American (1958); 2× First-team All-Big Ten (1957, 1958)

Career NFL statistics
- Interceptions: 1
- Fumble recoveries: 8
- Sacks: 34.5
- Stats at Pro Football Reference

Samuel F. Williams (March 9, 1931 – April 25, 2013) was an American professional football defensive end in the National Football League (NFL). He was a 24th round selection (288th overall pick) of the Los Angeles Rams in the 1956 NFL draft out of Michigan State University. Williams played for the Rams (1959), the Detroit Lions (1960–1965), and the Atlanta Falcons (1966–1967). He died in Livonia, Michigan, after a short illness.
