= Jim Houston =

American football player (1937–2018)

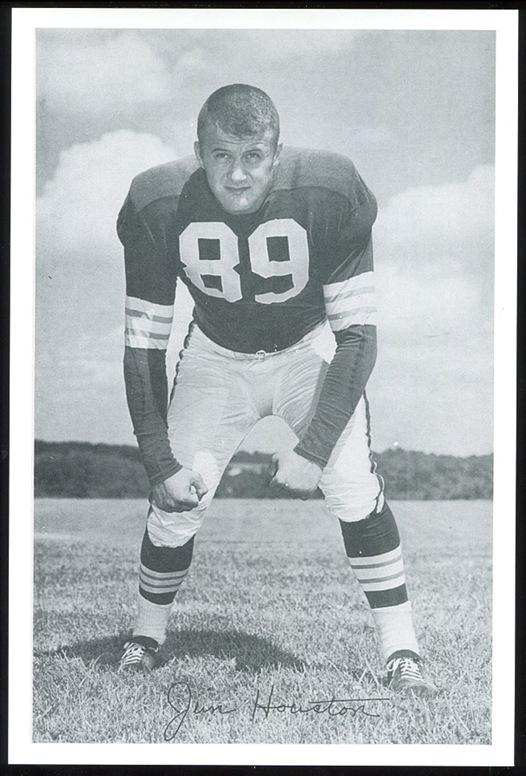
- Houston in 1961

No. 82
- Positions: Defensive end, linebacker

Personal information
- Born: November 3, 1937; Massillon, Ohio, U.S.
- Died: September 11, 2018 (aged 80); Massillon, Ohio, U.S.
- Listed height: 6 ft 3 in (1.91 m)
- Listed weight: 240 lb (109 kg)

Career information
- High school: Massillon Washington
- College: Ohio State
- NFL draft: 1960: 1st round, 8th overall pick
- AFL draft: 1960: 1st round

Career history
- Cleveland Browns (1960–1972)

Awards and highlights
- NFL champion (1964); 4× Pro Bowl (1964, 1965, 1969, 1970); Cleveland Browns legends (2006); National champion (1957); First-team All-American (1958); Second-team All-American (1959); 2× First-team All-Big Ten (1958, 1959)

Career NFL statistics
- Interceptions: 14
- Fumble recoveries: 11
- Total touchdowns: 4
- Stats at Pro Football Reference
- College Football Hall of Fame

James Edward Houston (November 3, 1937 – September 11, 2018) was an American professional football player who was a linebacker for 13 seasons with the Cleveland Browns in the National Football League (NFL). He played college football for the Ohio State Buckeyes. He was elected to the College Football Hall of Fame in 2005.

== College career ==
Houston played for the Ohio State Buckeyes as an end. He was a three-year starter under head coach Woody Hayes and twice the team MVP. He was elected the team captain as a senior.

Houston contributed on both offense and defense. Although known primarily for his excellent blocking and tackling, he helped the Buckeyes win a National Championship in 1957 (as recognized by the Coaches poll), and was also the leading receiver on the 1959 team, including a 100-yard game that year against Michigan State. He was an All-America selection in 1958 and 1959.

Houston was inducted into the Ohio State Varsity O Hall of Fame in 1979, and was named to the Ohio State Football All-Century Team as a defensive end in 2000.

Year	Receptions	Yards	TD	Minutes per Game
1957	4	126	1	42
1958	4	127	2	56
1959	11	214	4	56
Total	19	467	7	51.3

== Professional career ==
Houston was chosen in the first round of both the AFL draft by the Buffalo Bills and the NFL draft by the Cleveland Browns. Like his older brother Lin Houston, Jim chose the Browns. He originally played as a defensive end under head coach Paul Brown, but later moved to linebacker under Blanton Collier. At linebacker he became a four-time Pro Bowl selection, and helped the Browns win the 1964 NFL Championship.

== Later life ==
Houston died on September 11, 2018, at his home in Sagamore Hills of complications of dementia and amyotrophic lateral sclerosis (ALS). An autopsy conducted at Boston University found he had advanced (Stage 3) chronic traumatic encephalopathy. He was one of at least 345 NFL players to be diagnosed after death with this disease, which is caused by repeated hits to the head.

== Legacy ==
Houston was one of the few players to achieve the "triple crown" of football - winning a state championship in high school (Massillon), a National Championship in college (Ohio State), and an NFL Championship in the professional ranks (Cleveland Browns), all within his home state.

== Awards and honors ==
- 1953 Ohio High School Athletic Association (OHSAA) football championship
- 1957 national championship (Coaches poll)
- 1964 NFL Championship
- Four-time Pro Bowl selection
- College Football Hall of Fame (class of 2005)
