= Ron Burton =

American football player (1936–2003)

No. 22
- Position: Running back

Personal information
- Born: July 25, 1936; Springfield, Ohio, U.S.
- Died: September 13, 2003 (aged 67); Framingham, Massachusetts, U.S.
- Listed height: 5 ft 10 in (1.78 m)
- Listed weight: 190 lb (86 kg)

Career information
- High school: Springfield (OH)
- College: Northwestern
- NFL draft: 1960: 1st round, 9th overall pick
- AFL draft: 1960: 1st round

Career history
- Boston Patriots (1960–1965)

Awards and highlights
- Consensus All-American (1959); Third-team All-American (1958); 2× First-team All-Big Ten (1958, 1959)

Career AFL statistics
- Rushing yards: 1,536
- Rushing average: 3.6
- Receptions: 111
- Receiving yards: 1,205
- Total touchdowns: 19
- Stats at Pro Football Reference
- College Football Hall of Fame

Ronald E. Burton (July 25, 1936 – September 13, 2003) was an American professional football player in the American Football League (AFL) for the Boston Patriots. He was a consensus All-American running back at Northwestern University, and is a member of the Northwestern Hall of Fame and College Football Hall of Fame.

== Playing career ==
=== Northwestern Wildcats ===
Burton was a star on Ara Parseghian's late 1950s Northwestern Wildcats football teams. Named all-Big Ten in 1958 and 1959, and All-America in 1959, Burton left Northwestern having broken school records for most points in a career (130), most points in a season (76), most touchdowns in a career (21). Burton led Northwestern in all-purpose yards in 1957, 1958, and 1959. Burton finished 10th in the 1959 Heisman Trophy balloting.

=== Boston Patriots ===
Burton was the Boston Patriots' first-ever American Football League draft choice in 1960. He was the first Patriot to rush for over 100 yards: 127 against the Denver Broncos on October 23, 1960, as well as numerous other firsts for the Patriots. His 91-yard touchdown return on a missed field goal in 1962 remains a Patriot record. He compiled 1,009 combined yards in rushing and receiving in 1962, and provided strong depth at running back for the Patriots from 1960 through 1965.

Statistics: Ron Burton Sr. New England (Boston) Patriots 1960–1965

All-Time Leader in Punt Returns(Based on return yardage)Years: 1960-’65 NO: 56 FC: 0 YDS: 389AVG: 6.9 LG 62 TD: 0

Year-by-Year Leader in Punt Returns Year: 1965 NO: 15 YDS: 61 AVG: 4.1 LG 12 TD: 0

Year-by-Year Leader in Rushing Year: 1962 ATT: 134 YDS: 548 AVG: 4.0 LG: 59 TD: 2

== Personal life ==
His sons are Ron Burton Jr., a director of community relations for the Red Sox, Paul Burton, a reporter for WBZ-TV, and Steve Burton who is the Sports Director for WBZ-TV in Boston and a frequent guest on WEEI-FM sports radio. He also has another son Phil Burton. His granddaughter, Veronica, played basketball for the Dallas Wings and the Connecticut Sun of the Women's National Basketball Association (WNBA) and currently plays for the Golden State Valkyries. Ron III also started a camp called the Ron Burton Training Village, where boys and girls grow spiritually, academically, emotionally, and socially. Another daughter, Kayla, currently works for NBC Sports Boston.

In 2003, Burton died from multiple myeloma. At the time of his death, he was living in Framingham, Middlesex County, Massachusetts.

== See also ==
- List of American Football League players
