= Bob White (fullback) =

American football player (1938–2025)

No. 33
- Position: Fullback

Personal information
- Born: August 22, 1938; Portsmouth, Ohio, U.S.
- Died: May 7, 2025 (aged 86); Venice, Florida, U.S.
- Listed height: 6 ft 2 in (1.88 m)
- Listed weight: 220 lb (100 kg)

Career information
- High school: Covington (Covington, Kentucky)
- College: Ohio State
- NFL draft: 1960: 8th round, 91st overall pick
- AFL draft: 1960

Career history
- Houston Oilers (1960)

Awards and highlights
- AFL champion (1960); National champion (1957); Consensus All-American (1958); First-team All-Big Ten (1958); Second-team All-Big Ten (1957)
- Stats at Pro Football Reference

Loren Robert White (August 22, 1938 – May 7, 2025) was an American professional football player who was a fullback for the Houston Oilers of the American Football League (AFL). He played college football for the Ohio State Buckeyes.

== College career ==
At Ohio State University, White played college football for three seasons with the Buckeyes from 1957 to 1959, playing both fullback on offense and linebacker on defense. Each of those seasons, White was picked as the team's Most Valuable Player and named an Ohio State Academic All-Big Ten Honoree.

In 1957, he and the Buckeyes won the Big Ten Conference title and then went on to win the 1958 Rose Bowl over Oregon. Both the UPI and Football Writers named Ohio State the National Champions, but the AP placed the Buckeyes No. 2 behind Auburn.

In 1958, White had his best individual season, leading in the Buckeyes in scoring (12 touchdowns) and rushing (859 yards). White was named a First-Team All-American and finished fourth in the Heisman Trophy voting. He was also named the Academic All-American Player of the Year in 1958.

Following a less flashy senior year (312 rushing yards, no touchdowns), White finished his Ohio State career with 1,723 rushing yards and 13 touchdowns in 27 games.

== Professional career ==
White was drafted in eighth round, 91st overall by the Cleveland Browns in the 1960 NFL Draft, but opted to play for the Houston Oilers, who had drafted him. In his only AFL season, White played just six games for the champion Oilers.

== Death ==
White died on May 7, 2025, at the age of 86.

== Honors ==
White was inducted in to the Ohio State Varsity O Hall of Fame in 1987.
