= Ellison Kelly =

American gridiron football player (1935–2016)

No. 71, 54, 65
- Positions: Guard, tackle

Personal information
- Born: May 17, 1935; Lake City, Florida, U.S.
- Died: February 11, 2016 (aged 80); Hamilton, Ontario, Canada
- Listed height: 6 ft 1 in (1.85 m)
- Listed weight: 235 lb (107 kg)

Career information
- High school: Sandusky (Sandusky, Ohio)
- College: Michigan State
- NFL draft: 1959: 5th round, 59th overall pick

Career history
- New York Giants (1959); Hamilton Tiger-Cats (1960–1970); Toronto Argonauts (1971–1972)

Awards and highlights
- 3× Grey Cup champion (1963, 1965, 1967); 4× CFL All-Star (1964, 1969, 1970, 1971); 8× CFL East All-Star (1961–1964, 1968–1971); 2× First-team All-Big Ten (1957, 1958)

Career NFL statistics
- Games played: 12
- Games started: 1
- Stats at Pro Football Reference
- Canadian Football Hall of Fame

Ellison Lamar Kelly (May 17, 1935 – February 11, 2016) was an American and Canadian football offensive lineman for the Hamilton Tiger-Cats from 1960 to 1970 and the Toronto Argonauts from 1971 to 1972 of the Canadian Football League (CFL). He also played in the National Football League (NFL) for the New York Giants. Kelly never missed a game in his 12 seasons in the CFL, playing 175 consecutive games. Kelly usually played guard or tackle, but the versatile performer also provided depth at the defensive end and linebacker positions. Teammates recall him as being a tough, solid competitor, even when injured. He won three Grey Cups for the Tiger-Cats in 1963, 1965 & 1967 and played in the 1971 Grey Cup with the Argonauts.

Kelly was drafted in the fifth round of the 1959 NFL draft by the Giants after a stellar career at Michigan State University, but he opted to go to Canada to play in the CFL in his second season.

Kelly is one of the few football players to have a race horse named after him. "Wildcat Kelly" was a gelding pacer in the stable of Yellow and Black farms of Hamilton, a partnership of Dill (Pickles) Southwick, a former quarterback for the Hamilton Tigers, and businessmen Bruce Woodward and George Ridpath. (Yellow and Black were the colours of the Tiger Cats.) As of 1970, the six-year-old "Wildcat Kelly" had won $14,000 in its lifetime.

Kelly was inducted into the Canadian Football Hall of Fame in 1992. He spent his entire post-football life in Hamilton, Ontario, Canada, first as a teacher with the Hamilton Board of Education, and later as a Recreations Officer with the Hamilton-Wentworth Detention Centre, where he was regarded as a gentle giant and a gentleman. He was a frequent guest on Tiger Cat alumni days and was asked to speak on many occasions. His speeches were often dominated by a spiritual appreciation and gratitude for the wonderful life and opportunities he had been given. He continued to live in Hamilton until his death in 2016.
