= Milt Bruhn =

American football player and coach (1912–1991)

Biographical details
- Born: July 28, 1912; St. Bonifacius, Minnesota, U.S.
- Died: May 14, 1991 (aged 78); Madison, Wisconsin, U.S.

Playing career
- 1933–1935: Minnesota
- Position: Guard

Coaching career (HC unless noted)

Football
- 1936–1942: Amherst (line)
- 1943: Minnesota (ends)
- 1944–1945: Colgate (line)
- 1946: Franklin & Marshall (line)
- 1947–1948: Lafayette (line)
- 1949–1955: Wisconsin (line)
- 1956–1966: Wisconsin

Basketball
- 1946–1947: Franklin & Marshall

Baseball
- 1947: Franklin & Marshall

Administrative career (AD unless noted)
- 1967–1969: Wisconsin (assistant AD)

Head coaching record
- Overall: 52–45–6 (football); 7–9 (basketball); 9–5 (baseball)
- Bowls: 0–2

Accomplishments and honors

Championships
- As coach: 2× Big Ten (1959, 1962); As player: 2× National champion (1934, 1935)

Awards
- Wisconsin Football Coaches Association (WFCA) Hall of Fame (inducted in 1988)

Milton Caspar Bruhn (July 28, 1912 – May 14, 1991) was an American football player and coach. He served as the head coach at the University of Wisconsin–Madison from 1956 to 1966, compiling a record of 52–45–6 (.534). Bruhn led the Wisconsin Badgers to two outright Big Ten Conference championships in 1959 and 1962. His teams had two straight seven-win seasons, in 1958 and 1959, and an 8–2 record in 1962, with the two losses coming at Ohio State, 14–7, and against #1 USC, 42–37, in the 1963 Rose Bowl. Wisconsin ended the 1962 season with a #2 ranking, which remain the highest AP Poll and UPI/Coaches' Poll season-ending rankings for the Wisconsin football program in the history of these polls.

== Playing career ==
Bruhn attended high school in Mound, Minnesota, where he played football and basketball. He enrolled at the University of Minnesota in 1932. Bruhn played left guard for the Gopher teams that went undefeated and won Big Ten Conference championships in 1934 and 1935. Bruhn also played catcher on the baseball team at Minnesota that won the Big Ten Conference championship in 1935. He captained the baseball team in his senior year.

== Coaching career ==
Following his graduation from Minnesota in 1936, Bruhn went to Amherst College as football line coach and freshman coach in basketball and baseball. He remained there until 1943 when he returned to his alma mater, Minnesota, as ends coach. He joined the Colgate University football staff as line coach in 1944, then moved on to Franklin & Marshall College as line coach, in addition to being head baseball and basketball coach. He went to Lafayette College in 1947 as line coach under Ivy Williamson and then served as line coach on Williamson's staff at Wisconsin from 1949 to 1955. He succeeded Williamson as head football coach, when the latter moved to the position of athletic director following the death of Guy Sundt. After his tenure as head football coach at Wisconsin, Bruhn remained at Wisconsin as assistant athletic director from 1967 to 1969.

== Head coaching record ==
=== Football ===
| Year | Team | Overall | Conference | Standing | Bowl/playoffs | Coaches^{#} | AP^{°} |
|---|---|---|---|---|---|---|---|
Wisconsin Badgers (Big Ten Conference) (1956–1966)
| 1956 | Wisconsin | 1–5–3 | 0–4–3 | 9th | | | |
| 1957 | Wisconsin | 6–3 | 4–3 | T–4th | | 14 | 19 |
| 1958 | Wisconsin | 7–1–1 | 5–1–1 | 2nd | | 6 | 7 |
| 1959 | Wisconsin | 7–3 | 5–2 | 1st | L Rose | 6 | 6 |
| 1960 | Wisconsin | 4–5 | 2–5 | 9th | | | |
| 1961 | Wisconsin | 6–3 | 4–3 | 5th | | 18 | |
| 1962 | Wisconsin | 8–2 | 6–1 | 1st | L Rose | 2 | 2 |
| 1963 | Wisconsin | 5–4 | 3–4 | T–5th | | | |
| 1964 | Wisconsin | 3–6 | 2–5 | T–7th | | | |
| 1965 | Wisconsin | 2–7–1 | 2–5 | T–7th | | | |
| 1966 | Wisconsin | 3–6–1 | 2–4–1 | T–7th | | | |
| Wisconsin: | | 52–45–6 | 35–37–5 | | | | |
| Total: | | 52–45–6 | | | | | |
National championship Conference title Conference division title or championship game berth
^{#}Rankings from final Coaches Poll.; ^{°}Rankings from final AP Poll.
