= 1958 major college football rankings =

- Season: 1958
- Bowl season: 1958–59 bowl games
- Preseason No. 1: Ohio State
- End of season champions: LSU

Two human polls comprised the 1958 major college football rankings. Unlike most sports, college football's governing body, the NCAA, does not bestow a national championship, instead that title is bestowed by one or more different polling agencies. There are two main weekly polls that begin in the preseason—the AP Poll and the Coaches Poll.

== Legend ==
	Increase in ranking
	Decrease in ranking
	Not ranked previous week
	National champion
(#–#)	Win–loss record
(Italics)	Number of first place votes
т	Tied with team above or below also with this symbol

== AP poll ==
The final AP poll was released on December 1, at the end of the 1958 regular season, weeks before the major bowls. The AP would not release a post-bowl season final poll regularly until 1968.

	Preseason Aug	Week 1 Sep 22	Week 2 Sep 29	Week 3 Oct 6	Week 4 Oct 13	Week 5 Oct 20	Week 6 Oct 27	Week 7 Nov 3	Week 8 Nov 10	Week 9 Nov 17	Week 10 Nov 24	Week 11 (Final) Dec 1	
1.	Ohio State (46)	Ohio State (0–0) (45)	Oklahoma (1–0) (66)	Auburn (2–0) (43)	Army (3–0) (77)	Army (4–0) (90)	LSU (6–0) (54)	LSU (7–0) (82)	LSU (8–0) (95)	LSU (9–0) (114)	LSU (10–0) (115)	LSU (10–0) (130)	1.
2.	Oklahoma (23)	Oklahoma (0–0) (12)	Auburn (1–0) (58)	Oklahoma (2–0) (24)	Auburn (3–0) (54)	Ohio State (4–0) (14)	Iowa (4–0–1) (33)	Iowa (5–0–1) (54)	Iowa (6–0–1) (52)	Auburn (7–0–1) (21)	Auburn (8–0–1) (5)	Iowa (7–1–1) (17)	2.
3.	Notre Dame (11)	Auburn (0–0) (18)	Ohio State (1–0) (23)	Army (2–0) (7)	Ohio State (3–0) (9)	LSU (5–0) (22)	Army (4–0–1) (20)	Army (5–0–1) (7)	Army (6–0–1)	Army (7–0–1) (12)	Oklahoma (8–1) (9)	Army (8–0–1) (13)	3.
4.	Michigan State (4)	Michigan State (0–0)	Michigan State (1–0) (3)	Notre Dame (2–0) (7)	Wisconsin (3–0) (16)	Texas (5–0) (2)	Auburn (4–0–1) (23)	Northwestern (5–1)	Auburn (6–0–1) (6)	Oklahoma (7–1) (22)	Iowa (7–1–1) (16)	Auburn (9–0–1) (9)	4.
5.	Auburn (9)	Notre Dame (0–0) (6)	Army (1–0) (5)	Ohio State (2–0) (6)	Michigan State (2–0–1) (4)	Auburn (3–0–1) (5)	Ohio State (4–0–1) (9)	Auburn (5–0–1) (7)	Wisconsin (5–1–1)	Wisconsin (6–1–1)	Army (7–0–1) (1)	Oklahoma (9–1) (10)	5.
6.	Ole Miss	TCU (1–0) (12)	Ole Miss (2–0) (2)	Wisconsin (2–0) (6)	Navy (3–0) (1)	Ole Miss (5–0) (4)	Ole Miss (6–0) (7)	Oklahoma (5–1) (8)	Oklahoma (6–1) (3)	Iowa (6–1–1) (4)	Wisconsin (7–1–1) (3)	Air Force (9–0–1) (2)	6.
7.	Navy	Pittsburgh (1–0)	Notre Dame (1–0) (2)	Ole Miss (3–0) (1)	Texas (4–0) (3)	Iowa (3–0–1) (13)	Oklahoma (5–1) (5)	Wisconsin (4–1–1)	Ole Miss (7–1) (2)	TCU (7–1)	TCU (8–1)	Wisconsin (7–1–1) (13)	7.
8.	TCU	Army (0–0)	Iowa (1–0) (15)	Clemson (3–0) (4)	Ole Miss (4–0) (2)	Northwestern (4–0) (3)	Wisconsin (3–1–1)	Purdue (5–1)	Purdue (5–1–1)	Purdue (6–1–1) (8)	Air Force (8–0–1) (1)	Ohio State (6–1–2) (3)	8.
9.	Army (1)	Ole Miss (1–0)	Wisconsin (1–0) (2)	Michigan State (1–0–1) (1)	LSU (4–0) (2)	Oklahoma (4–1) (1)	Colorado (5–0) (2)	Ole Miss (6–1)	TCU (6–1)	Air Force (7–0–1)	Ohio State (6–1–2) (4)	Syracuse (8–1) (1)	9.
10.	North Carolina (1)	Washington State (1–0)	Clemson (2–0) (2)	Pittsburgh (3–0) (2)	Clemson (4–0) (7)	Clemson (4–0) (5)	Purdue (4–1)	Air Force (5–0–1)	Air Force (6–0–1)	Syracuse (7–1)	Syracuse (8–1) (1)	TCU (8–2)	10.
11.	Texas	Mississippi State (0–0)	Mississippi State (1–0)	LSU (3–0)	Oklahoma (3–1)	Notre Dame (3–1)	Northwestern (4–1)	TCU (5–1)	North Carolina (6–2) (2)	Ohio State (5–1–2) (6)	Purdue (6–1–2)	Ole Miss (8–2) (2)	11.
12.	Oregon State (2)	Navy (0–0)	Pittsburgh (2–0)	Navy (2–0)	Notre Dame (2–1) (1)	Colorado (4–0) (1)	Pittsburgh (4–1–1)	Syracuse (5–1) (3)	Syracuse (6–1)	Florida (4–3–1)	Clemson (7–2) (1)	Clemson (8–2) (1)	12.
13.	Iowa	West Virginia (1–0) (2)	LSU (2–0)	Purdue (2–0)	Iowa (2–0–1) (1)	Wisconsin (3–1)	Air Force (4–0–1)	Rice (4–2)	Northwestern (5–2)	Ole Miss (7–2)	Ole Miss (7–2)	Purdue (6–1–2)	13.
14.	Wisconsin	Wisconsin (0–0) (2)	Purdue (1–0)	Michigan (1–0–1) (1)	Oregon (2–1)	Air Force (3–0–1)	Rice (4–2)	Notre Dame (4–2)	Pittsburgh (5–2–1)	Vanderbilt (5–1–3)	Florida (5–3–1)	Florida (6–3–1)	14.
15.	Mississippi State (1)	LSU (1–0) т	Navy (1–0)	Oregon (1–1)	Houston (3–0) (1)	Purdue (3–1)	Navy (4–1)	North Carolina (5–2) (1)	SMU (4–3)	Notre Dame (5–3)	Vanderbilt (5–1–3)	South Carolina (6–3)	15.
16.	Miami (FL)	Miami (FL) (0–0) т	Michigan (1–0)	Texas (3–0)	SMU (1–2)	TCU (4–1)	Texas (5–1)	Ohio State (4–1–1) (1)	Ohio State (4–1–2)	Clemson (6–2)	South Carolina (5–3)	California (7–3)	16.
17.	SMU (1)	Kentucky (1–0) (2)	SMU (0–1) (1) т	Iowa (1–0–1)	Northwestern (3–0)	Georgia Tech (3–1–1)	North Carolina (5–2) (1)	Clemson (5–1)	Rice (4–3)	North Carolina (6–3) (1)	California (7–3)	Notre Dame (6–4) (1)	17.
18.	Clemson	Florida (1–0) т	Texas (2–0) т	SMU (0–2) (1)	Florida (2–1)	Navy (3–1)	TCU (4–1)	Rutgers (6–0) (1)	Florida (3–3–1)	Mississippi State (3–5)	Notre Dame (5–4)	SMU (6–4)	18.
19.	Pittsburgh	South Carolina (1–0) т	Houston (1–0)	Colorado (2–0) т	Michigan (1–1–1)	Mississippi State (3–1)	Clemson (4–1)	Florida (2–3–1)	Rutgers (7–0) (1)	California (6–3)	Pittsburgh (5–3–1)	Oklahoma State (7–3)	19.
20.	Texas A&M	SMU (0–0) (3)	Vanderbilt (2–0)	Houston (2–0) т	TCU (3–1)	Michigan State (2–1–1)	Rutgers (5–0) (1)	SMU (3–3)	Georgia Tech (5–2–1)	Northwestern (5–3)	Rutgers (8–0)	Rutgers (8–1) (1)	20.
	Preseason Aug	Week 1 Sep 22	Week 2 Sep 29	Week 3 Oct 6	Week 4 Oct 13	Week 5 Oct 20	Week 6 Oct 27	Week 7 Nov 3	Week 8 Nov 10	Week 9 Nov 17	Week 10 Nov 24	Week 11 (Final) Dec 1	
		Dropped: Clemson; Iowa; North Carolina; Oregon State; Texas; Texas A&M	Dropped: Florida; Kentucky; Miami (FL); South Carolina; TCU; Washington State; West Virginia	Dropped: Mississippi State; Vanderbilt	Dropped: Colorado; Pittsburgh; Purdue	Dropped: Florida; Houston; Michigan; Oregon; SMU	Dropped: Georgia Tech; Michigan State; Mississippi State; Notre Dame	Dropped: Colorado; Navy; Pittsburgh; Texas	Dropped: Clemson; Notre Dame	Dropped: Georgia Tech; Pittsburgh; Rice; Rutgers; SMU	Dropped: Mississippi State; North Carolina; Northwestern	Dropped: Pittsburgh; Vanderbilt	

== UPI Coaches Poll ==
The final United Press International (UPI) Coaches Poll was released prior to the bowl games, on December 1. This was the first UPI poll following the merger of United Press and International News Service.

LSU received 29 of the 35 first-place votes; Iowa received four, and one each went to Army and Air Force.

Ranking	Team	Conference	Bowl
1	LSU	SEC	Won Sugar, 7–0
2	Iowa	Big Ten	Won Rose, 38–12
3	Army	Independent	none
4	Auburn	SEC	none
5	Oklahoma	Big Eight	Won Orange, 21–6
6	Wisconsin	Big Ten	none
7	Ohio State	Big Ten	none
8	Air Force	Independent	Tied Cotton, 0–0
9	TCU	Southwest	Tied Cotton, 0–0
10	Syracuse	Independent	Lost Orange, 6–21
11	Purdue	Big Ten	none
12	Ole Miss	SEC	Won Gator, 7–3
13	Clemson	ACC	Lost Sugar, 0–7
14	Notre Dame	Independent	none
15	Florida	SEC	Lost Gator, 3–7
16	California	Pacific Coast	Lost Rose, 12–38
17	Northwestern	Big Ten	none
18	SMU	Southwest	none

- Prior to the 1975 season, the Big Ten and Pacific Coast (later AAWU / Pac-8) conferences allowed only one postseason participant each, for the Rose Bowl.
- The Ivy League has prohibited its members from participating in postseason football since the league was officially formed in 1954.

== Litkenhous Ratings ==
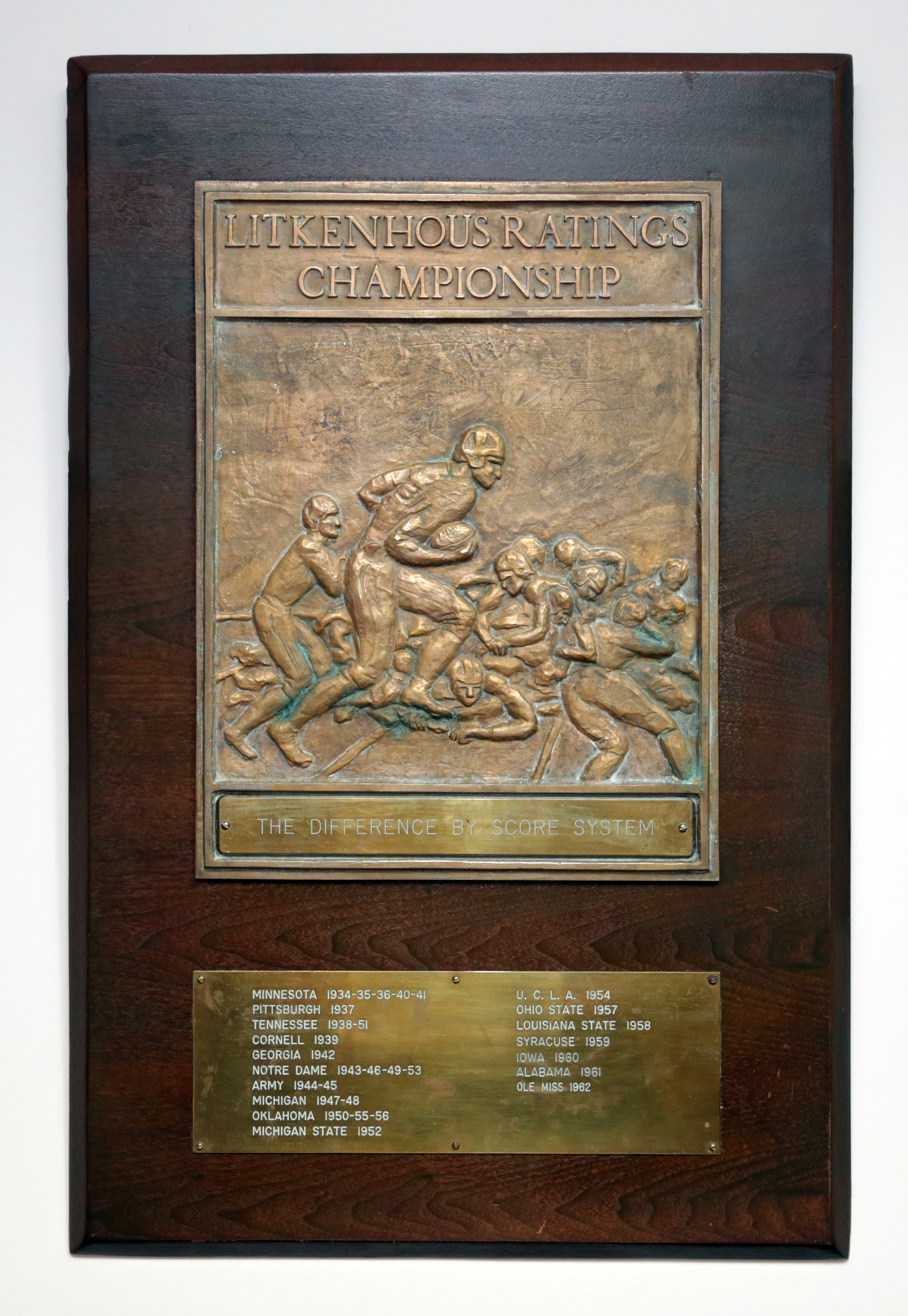
Litkenhous Ratings Championship trophy, 1934–1962

The final Litkenhous Ratings, released in December 1958, ranked over 650 teams. The top 50 teams as ranked by Litkenhous were:

1. LSU
2. Army
3. Oklahoma
4. Iowa
5. Wisconsin
6. Ole Miss
7. Syracuse
8. Purdue
9. TCU
10. Ohio State
11. Northwestern
12. SMU
13. Auburn
14. Notre Dame
15. Rice
16. Georgia
17. Florida
18. Penn State
19. Illinois
20. Air Force
21. Pittsburgh
22. Texas
23. North Carolina
24. Vanderbilt
25. Alabama
26. Washington State
27. Kentucky
28. Georgia Tech
29. Mississippi Southern
30. Arkansas
31. Oregon
32. Michigan State
33. Oklahoma State
34. Mississippi State
35. Houston
36. South Carolina
37. Trinity (TX)
38. USC
39. Minnesota
40. West Virginia
41. Florida State
42. Duke
43. Navy
44. Tulsa
45. Colorado
46. Tennessee
47. Texas East
48. Missouri
49. Indiana
50. California
73. Memphis State - 76.5
81. Chattanooga - 74.6

== See also ==
- 1958 College Football All-America Team
