= 1958 All-Big Ten Conference football team =

American college football all-star team

The 1958 All-Big Ten Conference football team consists of American football players chosen by various organizations for All-Big Ten Conference teams for the 1958 Big Ten Conference football season.

== All-Big Ten selections ==
=== Quarterbacks ===
- Randy Duncan, Iowa (AP-1; UPI-1)
- Dale Hackbart, Wisconsin (AP-2; UPI-2)
- Dick Thornton, Northwestern (AP-3; UPI-3)

=== Halfbacks ===
- Ron Burton, Northwestern (AP-1; UPI-1)
- Willie Fleming, Iowa (AP-1; UPI-3)
- Don Clark, Ohio State (AP-2; UPI-1)
- Dean Look, Michigan State (AP-3; UPI-2)
- Bob Ptacek, Michigan (UPI-2)
- Ray Jauch, Iowa (AP-2; UPI-3)
- Ted Smith, Indiana (AP-3)

=== Fullbacks ===
- Bob White, Ohio State (AP-1; UPI-1)
- Bob Jarus, Purdue (AP-2; UPI-2)
- Don Horn, Iowa (UPI-3)
- John Hobbs, Wisconsin (AP-3)

=== Ends ===
- Rich Kreitling, Illinois (AP-1; UPI-1)
- Jim Houston, Ohio State (AP-1; UPI-2)
- Sam Williams, Michigan State (AP-2; UPI-1)
- Tom Franckhauser, Purdue (AP-2; UPI-2)
- Curt Merz, Iowa (AP-3; UPI-3)
- Gary Prahst, Michigan (UPI-3)
- Dave Kocourek, Wisconsin (UPI-3)

=== Tackles ===
- Gene Selawski, Purdue (AP-1; UPI-1)
- Andy Cvercko, Northwestern (AP-1; UPI-3)
- Jim Marshall, Ohio State (AP-2; UPI-1)
- Jim Heineke, Wisconsin (AP-2; UPI-2)
- Dan Lanphear, Wisconsin (UPI-2)
- John A. Burroughs Jr., Iowa (UPI-3)
- Gene Gossage, Northwestern (AP-3)
- George Genyk, Michigan (AP-3)

=== Guards ===
- Ron Maltony, Purdue (AP-1; UPI-2)
- Jerry Stalcup, Wisconsin (AP-1; UPI-2)
- Bill Burrell, Illinois (AP-2; UPI-1)
- Ellison Kelly, Michigan State (UPI-1)
- Gary Grouwinkel, Iowa (AP-3; UPI-3)
- Mike Rabold, Indiana (AP-2; UPI-3)
- Bill Kerr, Indiana (AP-3)

=== Centers ===
- Dick Teteak, Wisconsin (AP-1; UPI-3)
- Mike Svendsen, Minnesota (AP-2; UPI-1)
- Jim Andreotti, Northwestern (AP-3; UPI-2)

== Key ==
AP = Associated Press

UPI = United Press International, selected by the conference coaches

Bold = Consensus first-team selection of both the AP and UPI

== See also ==
- 1958 College Football All-America Team
