= 4–3 defense =

American football defensive formation

A 4–3 base defense (blue) matched up with an offset I formation offense (orange)

In American football, a 4–3 defense is a defensive alignment consisting of four down linemen and three linebackers. It is called a "base defense" because it is the default defensive alignment used on "base downs" (1st and 2nd downs). However, defenses will readily switch to other defensive alignments (such as a nickel defense or a dime defense) as circumstances change. Alternatively, some teams use a 3–4 defense.

== History ==
The Giants employed a 6–1–4 basic formation when they shut out the Browns in 1950, but on many plays this became a 4–1–6 in reality, when the ball was snapped, because the ends dropped off the line to afford extraordinary coverage on passes

— Steve Owen, My Kind of Football, 1952, p. 183

Early in the history of the National Football League, teams stacked the defensive line of scrimmage with seven linemen, typically using a 7-diamond or the 7-box. With the liberalization of the forward passing rules in 1933, the defenses began to evolve along with the offensive changes, and by the later 1930s, the standard defense in the NFL and college was the 6–2. The successes of the T formation and the introduction of free substitution, abolishing the one-platoon system, in the 1940s led to the almost universal adoption by 1950 of the five-man line. There were two versions popular in the NFL. The 5–3 was an older defense that remained popular through the 1940s and early 1950s.

By the late 1940s, Greasy Neale's 5–2 Eagle defense was creating problems for offenses with a five-man line and four-man secondary. Roughly concurrently, Paul Brown had developed a vertical timing offense. The Cleveland Browns won every championship of the rival All-America Football Conference from its inception in 1946 through its final season in 1949. In the first game of the 1950 season, NFL Commissioner Bert Bell had the newly admitted Browns play the champion Philadelphia Eagles on a Saturday ahead of the rest of the league's scheduled Sunday games. The Browns handily won the game in Philadelphia 35–10 and showed they were a force to be reckoned with.

Defenses knew they had to find a way to stop the spread-out vertical offense of the Browns. New York Giants head coach Steve Owen came up with his umbrella defense which showed a 6–1–4 alignment before the snap but could flex (drop back) its two defensive ends into pass protection. The defense was successful, and the only two losses by the Browns in 1950 came at the hands of the Giants. While the concept belonged to Owen, the newly acquired defensive back, Tom Landry, explained and taught the defense. While the defense was a precursor to the traditional 4–3–4 of today, it was not yet evolved into what one would call a traditional 4–3 defense. That took an additional six years. Landry delegated defensive lineman Sam Huff as his middle linebacker as the 4-3 defensive, with Huff admitting that the transition to Middle linebacker allowed him to see the entire field, essentially creating the middle linebacker position.

Other NFL teams came to a version of the 4–3 via a different route. Despite the success of the Browns in the single game with the Eagles, the 5–2 Eagle became more popular, and more teams began to switch to it from the older 5–3 defense. Because the 5–2 lacks a middle linebacker, it was vulnerable to passes over the middle. As a consequence, 5–2 teams experimented with pulling their middle guards back, and many teams were trying this new approach by 1954. In 1956, Landry became the first defensive coordinator to switch to the 4–3 as a base defense. As the 1956 Giants won the NFL Championship, this gave the 4–3 enormous exposure, and just about the whole NFL converted to the new system the following season.

In the original version of the 4–3, the tackles lined up over the offensive guards and the ends lined up on the outside shoulder of the offensive tackles, with the middle linebacker over the center and the other linebackers outside the ends. In the mid-1960s, Hank Stram developed a popular variation, the "Kansas City Stack", which shifted the strong-side defensive end over the tight end, stacked the strong-side linebacker over the tackle, and shifted the weak-side tackle over center. At about the same time, the Cleveland Browns frequently used a weak-side shift. Landry developed a "flex" variation, in order to take advantage of the quickness of his Hall of Fame tackle, Bob Lilly. In Landry's original 4–3 defenses (4–3 inside and 4–3 outside), both defensive tackles were flexed. In the "flex", on a pro set right, with defensive keys showing a run to the right, the right defensive tackle would be flush on the line and was supposed to penetrate. The right defensive end and left defensive tackle were flexed two feet off the line of scrimmage, the right defensive end now head-on with the left offensive tackle (i.e. a 4–2–2–5 front instead of the more common 5–2–2–5 front). This gave the defense a "zig zag" look unlike any other of its day. The 'flex' was developed to counter option blocking by the offensive lines which had learned to move their heads up defensive linemen to either side to create holes. The running back would then patiently run to daylight. The Flex allowed two defensive linemen to read and react better to the option blocking. The other two linemen could either attack upfield or hold their single gap like the flexed linemen and wait for the ball to come to them. These concepts of shooting the gap and shoot and hold the gap are integral parts of today's more modern versions of the 4–3 which include the Tampa 2 scheme, the Seattle Seahawks shoot and hold defense and the 4–3 slide.

== Defensive line ==
Two defensive tackles split the center in the base 4–3 defense.

Defensive tackles

There are two defensive tackles in the 4–3 scheme. Teams whose base front is an "over" or "under" front will have a nose tackle in this scheme. In schemes whose base set is an even 4–3, there is no nose tackle. Instead, there is a left and right defensive tackle. When teams do not have a nose tackle, the tackles line up face on the offensive guards. The nose tackle is generally slightly larger and stronger and plays a shade or head up technique in which he lines up on either the outside shoulder of the center or in the middle of his body depending on which way the strength of the play is going. The nose tackle's primary job is to stop the run and take on the double team (which is getting blocked by both the center and the weakside or pulling guard) thus freeing up the linebackers to make a play. The second defensive tackle (simply referred to as the defensive tackle, under tackle or three tech) is generally a bit quicker and faster than the nose tackle, ideally weighing close to 300 pounds (140 kg) but quick-footed enough to shoot through a gap at the snap. He plays a three technique, meaning he lines up on the outside shoulder of the strong side offensive guard. The job of a three tech is to prevent the run, keep the guard off linebackers, and rush the quarterback on pass plays.

The defensive ends flank the tackles.

Defensive ends

Teams that want to use a standard 4–3 scheme often face a dilemma: there aren't enough great defensive ends to go around. Players like Julius Peppers or Dwight Freeney come along about once per year in the draft.

— Mike Tanier, analyst for NFL on Fox.

The defensive end's primary role in the 4–3 defense is to get to the quarterback and create pressure. The 4–3 DEs are the smallest of all of the defensive lineman due to their emphasis on speed over strength. They still need to be strong enough to fight their way past offensive tackles, yet quick enough to pursue the running backs on runs to the outside. Ideal 4–3 defensive ends are athletic and agile and their strength is getting up the field quickly and they usually weigh between 265 and 295 pounds (120 and 134 kg). Right ends, who line up against the offensive left tackle and attack from the blind side of a right-handed quarterback, are usually the best athletes on the line, combining a 275-pound body with quickness and agility to outflank blockers who are bigger and heavier. Defensive ends generally play the 1 gap technique, though will occasionally be forced to play a 2 gap in the event of a TE pinching in to block on run plays. In most schemes, they are also responsible for keeping the quarterback from rolling out of the pocket to make big running gains.

Variant

Some teams, like the Seattle Seahawks, Denver Broncos, Cincinnati Bengals, and Las Vegas Raiders, use an alternative of the 4–3 defense, a big, strong, 280-plus-pound strong side defensive end to stop the run on their base formation, and on passing downs they kick inside at defensive tackle to insert a pass rush specialist. But players like Von Miller, an elite and undersized defensive end, play strong side linebacker on first and second downs and use their pass rushing ability on passing downs by lining up at stand up defensive end to bring pressure on the quarterback.

== Linebackers ==
Linebackers in the 4–3 base defense

Middle linebacker

There is only one inside linebacker in the 4–3 scheme, so he is called the middle linebacker (MLB), sometimes known as the "Mike" linebacker. He must be as smart as he is athletic, acts as the "quarterback of the defense" and is often the defensive leader. The primary responsibility of the "Mike" is to stop the run, though he will often be asked to fall back in zone coverage in pass protection; man to man pass coverage has him assigned to the fullback typically. The MLB is often the largest and strongest of all of the linebackers.

The 4–3 defense relies on having a sure tackler at the middle linebacker spot. Most notably, Monte Kiffin's "Tampa Cover 2" scheme makes high demands on the MLB, requiring him to have above-average speed, and additional skills to be able to read the play and either maintain his central position to help the outside linebackers cover short passes, drop behind the linebackers in coverage and protect the zone of the field behind the outside linebackers from 11 to 20 yards out, or run up to the line of scrimmage to help assist in stopping the runs. Luke Kuechly and Brian Urlacher were prototypical "Mike" linebackers before retirement. Fred Warner is a prototypical "Mike" linebacker in the modern NFL.

Outside linebackers

As in the 3–4 defense there are two outside linebackers in the 4–3. These outside backers are known as the strong side and weak side linebackers. The strong side, or "Sam" linebacker, is so named because he typically sticks to the strong side of the defense, across from the tight end. The "Sam" does his fair share of blitzing; however, he also needs to play the run and take on blockers, making him a bigger linebacker on average than the weak-side linebacker. He will usually be relied upon to cover the tight end or potentially a back out of the backfield. Anthony Barr is a prototypical "Sam" linebacker. The weak side, or "Will" linebacker, will generally play on the weak side and has more freedom than the other LBs, often blitzing the quarterback or guarding against the screen. He also has heavy coverage responsibilities, making a good number of today's Will linebackers former safeties. Lavonte David is a prototypical "Will" linebacker.

== Secondary ==
The 4–3 defense generally uses four defensive backs. Two of these are safeties, and two of them are cornerbacks. A cornerback's responsibilities vary depending on the type of coverage called.

Coverage is simply how the defense will be protecting against the pass. The corners will generally line up 3 to 5 yards off the line of scrimmage, generally trying to "Jam" or interrupt the receiver's route within the first 5 yards. A corner will be given one of two ways to defend the pass (with variations that result in more or less the same responsibilities): zone and man. In zone coverage, the cornerback is responsible for an area on the field. In this case, the corner must always stay downfield of whomever he is covering while still remaining in its zone. Zone is a more relaxed defensive scheme meant to provide more awareness across the defensive secondary while sacrificing tight coverage. As such, the corner in this case would be responsible for making sure nobody gets outside of him, always, or downfield of him, in cases where there is no deep safety help. In man coverage, however, the cornerback is solely responsible for the man across from him, usually the offensive player split farthest out.

The free safety is responsible for reading the offensive plays and covering deep passes. Depending on the defensive call, he may also provide run support. He is positioned 10 to 15 yards behind the line of scrimmage, toward the center of the field. He provides the last line of defense against running backs and receivers who get past the linebackers and cornerbacks. He must be a quick and smart player, capable of making tackles efficiently as well as reading the play and alerting his team of game situations. The strong safety is usually larger than the free safety and is positioned relatively close to the line of scrimmage. He is often an integral part of the run defense, but is also responsible for defending against a pass; especially against passes to the tight ends.

== Bibliography ==
- Carroll, Bob, Gershman, Michael, Neft, David, and Thorn, John, Total Football II: The Official Encyclopedia of the National Football League, Harper Collins, 1999, Chapter 17.
- Halas, George, Morgan, Gwen, and Veysey, Arthur, Halas by Halas, McGraw-Hill, 1979.
- Lombardi, Vince, Vince Lombardi on Football, New York Graphic Society, 1973.
- Owen, Steve, My Kind of Football, David McKay, 1952.
- Golenbock, Peter, Cowboys Have Always Been my Heroes, Warner Books, 1997, Chapter 20.
- Zimmerman, Paul, The New Thinking Man's Guide to Pro Football, Simon and Schuster, 1984, Chapter 6.
- Piascik, Andy, The Best Show in Football: The 1946–1955 Cleveland Browns – Pro Football's Greatest Dynasty, Taylor Trade Publishing, 2006 [ebook]
