= 1958 Nebraska Cornhuskers football team =

American college football season

1958 Nebraska Cornhuskers football
- Conference: Big Seven Conference
- Record: 3–7 (1–5 Big 7)
- Head coach: Bill Jennings (2nd season)
- Home stadium: Memorial Stadium

1958 Big Seven Conference football standings
| | Conf. | | | | | Overall |
| Team | W | | L | | T | W | | L | | T |
|---|---|---|---|---|---|---|---|---|---|---|
| No. 5 Oklahoma $ | 6 | – | 0 | – | 0 | 10 | – | 1 | – | 0 |
| Missouri | 4 | – | 1 | – | 1 | 5 | – | 4 | – | 1 |
| Colorado | 4 | – | 2 | – | 0 | 6 | – | 4 | – | 0 |
| Kansas | 3 | – | 2 | – | 1 | 4 | – | 5 | – | 1 |
| Kansas State | 2 | – | 4 | – | 0 | 3 | – | 7 | – | 0 |
| Nebraska | 1 | – | 5 | – | 0 | 3 | – | 7 | – | 0 |
| Iowa State | 0 | – | 6 | – | 0 | 4 | – | 6 | – | 0 |
$ – Conference champion; Rankings from AP Poll

The 1958 Nebraska Cornhuskers football team was the representative of the University of Nebraska and member of the Big 7 Conference in the 1958 college football season. The team was coached by Bill Jennings and played their home games at Memorial Stadium in Lincoln, Nebraska.

== Before the season ==
Nebraska was reeling from the 1957 season that saw a new all-time low mark set when the Cornhuskers finished 1–9–0, which was the first 1-win season since 1899, and the first ever 9-loss season. Coach Jennings began the second year of his first head coaching job with few places to go but up, but led a young squad with only six seniors. The 1958 schedule was loaded with powerhouse teams from the east, every bit as difficult as the 1957 slate had been, so the task to succeed over last year would not be an easy one.

== Schedule ==
| Date | Time | Opponent | Site | TV | Result | Attendance | Source |
|---|---|---|---|---|---|---|---|
| September 20 | 2:00 pm | Penn State* | Memorial Stadium; Lincoln, NE | | W 14–7 | 26,966 | |
| September 27 | 12:30 pm | at Purdue* | Ross–Ade Stadium; West Lafayette, IN | | L 0–28 | 42,914 | |
| October 4 | 2:00 pm | Iowa State | Memorial Stadium; Lincoln, NE (rivalry) | | W 7–6 | 30,310 | |
| October 11 | 2:00 pm | Kansas State | Memorial Stadium; Lincoln, NE (rivalry) | | L 6–23 | 37,596 | |
| October 18 | 11:30 am | at Syracuse* | Archbold Stadium; Syracuse, NY | | L 0–38 | 17,083 | |
| October 25 | 3:00 pm | at No. 12 Colorado | Folsom Field; Boulder, CO (rivalry) | NBC | L 16–27 | 40,271 | |
| November 1 | 2:00 pm | Missouri^{†} | Memorial Stadium; Lincoln, NE (rivalry) | | L 0–31 | 31,816 | |
| November 8 | 1:25 pm | at Kansas | Memorial Stadium; Lawrence, KS (rivalry) | | L 7–29 | 23,760 | |
| November 15 | 2:00 pm | No. 14 Pittsburgh* | Memorial Stadium; Lincoln, NE | | W 14–6 | 24,107 | |
| November 22 | 2:00 pm | at No. 4 Oklahoma | Oklahoma Memorial Stadium; Norman, OK (rivalry) | | L 7–40 | 44,740 | |
*Non-conference game; ^{†}Homecoming; Rankings from AP Poll released prior to the game; Source:

== Roster ==
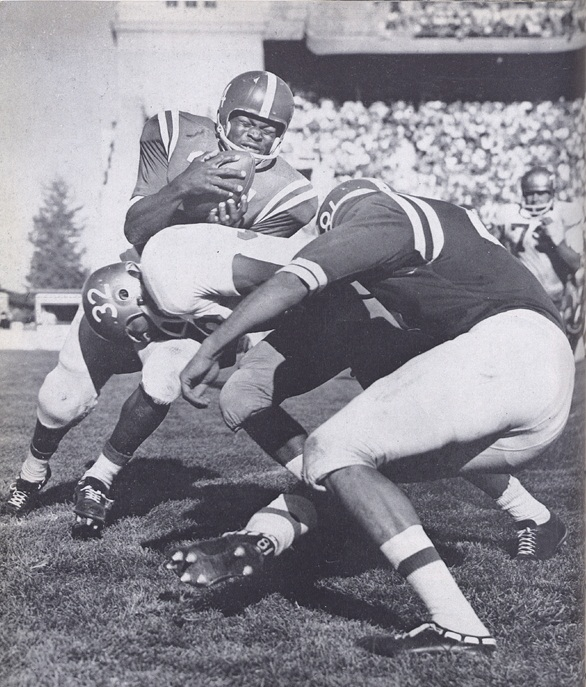
Halfback Clay White

Official Roster
| 53 Barnes, Tim C (So.); 33 Bigelow, Lee FB (So.); 34 Bohanan, Bill FB (Jr.); 86 Bond, John E (So.); 83 Brede, Roger E (Jr.); 71 Cowan, Mike RT (Jr.); 23 Cozine, Dean QB (So.); 51 Daniels, Robert C (So.); 15 Davis, Don HB (So.); 44 Dickson, Joe HB (So.); 66 Dohrman, Melvin RG (Sr.); 78 Doyle, Dennis RT (So.); 74 Edeal, Russell LT (So.); 80 Eger, Mike E (So.); 61 Emanuel, Dennis LG (Jr.); 40 Fischer, Pat HB (So.); 10 Flock, WilliamDean HB (Sr.); 50 Fricke, Donald C (So.); 79 Gacusana, Joe LT (So.); 54 Haggard, Ken C (So.); 20 Harshman, George QB (Sr.); 73 Hart, Joseph RT (Sr.); 13 Heldt, Don LT (So.); 46 Hergenreter, Jim HB (Jr.); 38 Jordan, Don LG (Jr.); 52 Kitchen, Robert C (So.); 63 Kosier, Richard RG (So.); 75 Laabs, Donald LT (So.); 65 Lafleur, Jim RG (Jr.); 82 Lee, Michael E (Sr.) | 72 Luecke, John RT (So.); 12 Martz, Max HB (Jr.); 30 McCashland, Dick FB (Sr.); 88 McDole, Ron E (So.); 39 Meyers, Roger LG (Jr.); 19 Micek, Michael RT (So.); 11 Minnick, John HB (So.); 76 Mongerson, Duane LT (Jr.); 64 Moore, James RG (Jr.); 89 Moskovitz, Milton E (So.); 43 Naviaux, Larry HB (Sr.); 17 Noe, George RT (Jr.); 18 Ohlen, Alfred RT (So.); 77 Olson, Don RT (Jr.); 84 Ondracek, Denny E (So.); 42 Place, Dick HB (So.); 68 Ponsiego, John LG (Jr.); 41 Ratzloff, Daniel LG (So.); 69 Salak, Duane RG (So.); 81 Sapp, Guy E (Sr.); 37 Scarrow, Lloyd FB (Jr.); 67 Siemer, Dale LG (Jr.); 85 Simon, Scott E (So.); 22 Stinnett, Roy QB (Sr.); 21 Tolly, Harry QB (Jr.); 87 Tuning, Bill E (Jr.); 70 Wellman, Allen LT (So.); 14 White, Clay HB (So.); 31 Zaruba, Carroll HB (Sr.); 62 Zentic, LeRoy RG (Jr.) |

== Depth Chart ==
Defense by committee
| HB | HB |
| | LB / LB |
| CB | DE / DT / NT / DT / DE | CB |

Offensive starters

LE
Bill Bohanan
Mike Eger

| LG | C | RG | LT | RT |
|---|---|---|---|---|
| Dennis Emanuel | Donald Fricke | Dick Kosier | Duane Mongerson | Al Wellman |
| John Ponsiego | James Moore | Dale Siemer | Russell Edeal | John Luecke |

RE
John Bond
Guy Sapp

QB
George Harshman
Harry Tolly

| LB | RB | FB |
|---|---|---|
| Pat Fischer | Larry Naviaux | Dick McCashland |
| Carroll Zaruba; Max Martz | Clay White | Lee Bigelow |

== Coaching staff ==
| Name | Title | First year in this position | Years at Nebraska | Alma mater |
|---|---|---|---|---|
| Bill Jennings | Head coach | 1957 | 1956–1961 | Oklahoma |
| L. F. "Pop" Klein | Assistant coach | 1945 | 1945–1958 | |
| Don Strasheim | | 1954 | 1954–1958 | Nebraska |
| Don Scarbrough | Assistant coach | 1956 | 1956–1961 | |
| Dick Monroe | | 1957 | 1957–1961 | |
| Warren Schmakel | | 1957 | 1957–1959 | |
| LeRoy Pearce | | 1958 | 1958–1961 | |
| John Gordy | | 1958 | 1958 | Tennessee |

== Game summaries ==
=== Penn State ===
| Team | 1 | 2 | Total |
|---|---|---|---|
| Penn State | | | 7 |
| • Nebraska | | | 14 |

- Date: September 20
- Location: Memorial Stadium • Lincoln, Nebraska
- Game attendance: 26,966

A shocked home field crowd watched in utter amazement as the highly ranked Nittany Lions were picked apart by the Cornhuskers. The media overwhelmingly had predicted a smashing Penn State victory, but the Nebraska team came out on fire and held Penn State off the scoreboard until the 4th quarter. A 91-yard kickoff return by Cornhusker HB Pat Fischer made the difference in the game's final seven-point margin. Nebraska still lagged behind the Nittany Lions 2–4 all time.

=== Purdue ===
| Team | 1 | 2 | Total |
|---|---|---|---|
| Nebraska | | | 0 |
| • Purdue | | | 28 |

- Date: September 27
- Location: Ross–Ade Stadium • West Lafayette, Indiana
- Game attendance: 29,475

In a complete turnaround of fortunes, the traveling Cornhuskers were overrun by a relentless Purdue attack and could not produce any offensive yardage of value. Two lost fumbles and an interception contributed to the lopsided loss as Nebraska was blanked under the weight of four Boilermaker touchdowns. This was the first meeting of these teams.

=== Iowa State ===
| Team | 1 | 2 | Total |
|---|---|---|---|
| Iowa State | | | 6 |
| • Nebraska | | | 7 |

- Date: October 4
- Location: Memorial Stadium • Lincoln, Nebraska
- Game attendance: 30,310

Iowa State's bid to take a second straight game from the Cornhuskers was denied as the final minutes ticked away. Down 0–6 after an earlier Cyclone touchdown and blocked point after, Nebraska finally punched in a touchdown of their own shortly before time expired. The Cornhusker kick after was good, sending the Cyclones home with their 42nd loss in the 52-game series.

=== Kansas State ===
| Team | 1 | 2 | Total |
|---|---|---|---|
| • Kansas State | | | 23 |
| Nebraska | | | 6 |

- Date: October 11
- Location: Memorial Stadium • Lincoln, Nebraska
- Game attendance: 37,596

Plagued by injuries, Nebraska was unsuccessful in attempts to slow the Kansas State offensive plan. The Cornhuskers narrowly avoided the shutout only by an interception returned for a touchdown. The Wildcats enjoyed their relatively rare victory, their 8th in 42 attempts, with the knowledge that it was also marked the 200th all-time program loss suffered by the Cornhuskers.

=== Syracuse ===
| Team | 1 | 2 | Total |
|---|---|---|---|
| Nebraska | | | 0 |
| • Syracuse | | | 38 |

- Date: October 18
- Location: Archbold Stadium • Syracuse, New York
- Game attendance: 17,083

Following the loss to Kansas State and still not fully recovered from early season injuries, Nebraska traveled to Syracuse with third-stringers starting in some positions. The imbalance in experience showed as the Orangemen had little difficulty running away with the game in a 38–0 blanking of the Cornhuskers. The win moved Syracuse ahead in the series, to 5–4–0.

=== Colorado ===
| Team | 1 | 2 | Total |
|---|---|---|---|
| Nebraska | | | 16 |
| • #12 Colorado | | | 27 |

- Date: October 25
- Location: Folsom Field • Boulder, Colorado
- Game attendance: 40,271

The Cornhuskers were struggling to find some success on the field to show for their efforts, but faced a stiff road test when visiting #12 Colorado in Boulder. Against expectations, Nebraska blocked two punts and capitalized on three turnovers to lead the Buffaloes for the first three quarters, putting a good scare into the crowd. However, the Cornhuskers finally gave way in the final quarter and allowed Colorado to surge ahead and take the game. It was Nebraska's third straight loss to the Buffaloes as their series lead slipped to just 9–8–0.

=== Missouri ===
| Team | 1 | 2 | Total |
|---|---|---|---|
| • Missouri | | | 31 |
| Nebraska | | | 0 |

- Date: November 1
- Location: Memorial Stadium • Lincoln, Nebraska
- Game attendance: 31,816

Nebraska suffered yet another demoralizing loss as the Tigers arrived in Lincoln and handed another shutout defeat to the Cornhuskers, their third of the season. The homecoming crowd was never a factor, as the Nebraska offense never seemed to find a spark. The best Nebraska performance of the day was the kicking game, made necessary for lack of first down production. Missouri narrowed the series to 20–28–3 and kept the Missouri-Nebraska Victory Bell in Columbia.

=== Kansas ===
| Team | 1 | 2 | Total |
|---|---|---|---|
| Nebraska | | | 7 |
| • Kansas | | | 29 |

- Date: November 8
- Location: Memorial Stadium • Lawrence, Kansas
- Game attendance: 23,760

The game was somewhat closer than the final score indicated, as Nebraska drew within five yards of a touchdown on two occasions before being turned away. The Jayhawks were not impressed by statistical victories and had little difficulty defeating the Cornhuskers by 22 points in Lawrence, though their series record was still far behind Nebraska at 15–46–3. It was Nebraska's fifth straight loss, which would've tied the program's all-time loss streak record had it not just been broken by the seven-game skid set in the previous year.

=== Pittsburgh ===
| Team | 1 | 2 | Total |
|---|---|---|---|
| #14 Pittsburgh | | | 6 |
| • Nebraska | | | 14 |

- Date: November 15
- Location: Memorial Stadium • Lincoln, Nebraska
- Game attendance: 24,107

The Cornhuskers were 2–6 against #14 Pittsburgh. The Panthers held dominance over Nebraska before, owning the series at 15–3–3 heading into this game. The Cornhuskers contested, holding the lead through the entire game and not allowing the Panthers to get their single touchdown until the fourth quarter on a long pass completion. Though dominated by their conference opponents this year, the Cornhuskers were then 2–2 in nonconference play against major eastern teams.

=== Oklahoma ===
| Team | 1 | 2 | Total |
|---|---|---|---|
| Nebraska | | | 7 |
| • #4 Oklahoma | | | 40 |

- Date: November 22
- Location: Oklahoma Memorial Stadium • Norman, Oklahoma
- Game attendance: 44,740

If Pittsburgh allowed themselves to overlook and then get stunned by Nebraska, the #4 Sooners took note and ensured the same fate did not befall their team in the annual Nebraska-Oklahoma game. By the end of the first quarter, Oklahoma already had put in three touchdowns, and they never looked back. The Cornhuskers avoided the shutout only by returning an interception 89 yards to score. The loss to Oklahoma was the 16th straight allowed by Nebraska, and was Oklahoma's 71st consecutive conference win. Oklahoma went on to finish #5 in the AP Poll and then defeated Syracuse 21–6 in the 1959 Orange Bowl.

== After the season ==
It wasn't easy to determine if 1958 was a successful season or another failure. Coach Jennings had improved over last year's dismal 1–9–0 outing, but only to 3–7–0 and a 6th-place finish in the Big 7. On the other hand, surprise upset wins against Syracuse and especially against Pittsburgh were remarkable bright spots on an otherwise dreary year. These two unexpected wins may have played a part in Jennings being given additional time to see if he could turn the program around. Now with two years on the job, Coach Jennings had compiled a dismal 4–16–0 (.200) career record, with an even worse 2–10–0 (.167) history within the conference. Nebraska's overall program record slipped for the 8th straight year, to 355–205–34 (.626), with a Big 7 record now down to 148–68–12 (.689).

== Future professional players ==
- Pat Fischer, 1961 17th-round pick of the St. Louis Cardinals
- Ron McDole, 1961 4th-round pick of the St. Louis Cardinals
