= 6/2 =

6/2 may refer to:

- Volleyball#6–2, a volleyball formation
- 6–2 defense, in American football
- June 2 (month-day date notation)
- February 6 (day-month date notation)
