= 1958 Texas Tech Red Raiders football team =

American college football season

1958 Texas Tech Red Raiders football
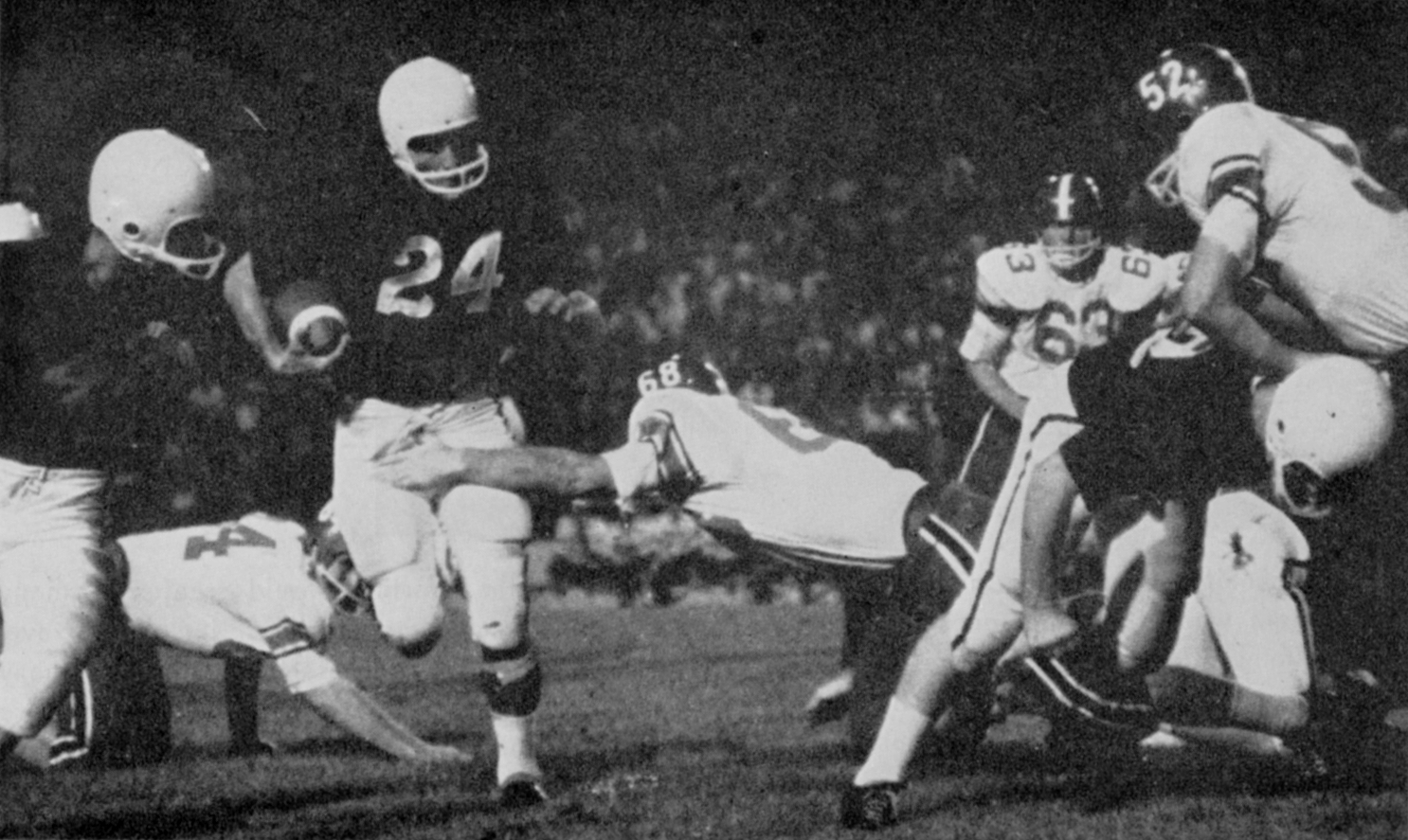
- 1958 Texas Tech football team in action against Texas A&M
- Conference: Independent
- Record: 3–7
- Head coach: DeWitt Weaver (8th season)
- Offensive scheme: T formation
- Base defense: 5–3
- Home stadium: Jones Stadium

1958 Southern major college football independents records
	Conf.			Overall
Team	W	L	T	W		L		T
No. 19 Oklahoma State		–		8	–	3	–	0
Florida State		–		7	–	4	–	0
Navy		–		6	–	3	–	0
Texas Tech		–		3	–	7	–	0
Miami (FL)		–		2	–	8	–	0
Rankings from AP poll

The 1958 Texas Tech Red Raiders football team represented Texas Technological College—now known as Texas Tech University—as an independent during the 1958 college football season. In their eighth season under head coach DeWitt Weaver, the Red Raiders compiled a 3–7 record and were outscored by opponents by a combined total of 163 to 126. The team's statistical leaders included Jerry Bell with 435 passing yards, Ronnie Rice with 263 rushing yards, and Floyd Dellinger with 231 receiving yards. The team played its home games at Clifford B. and Audrey Jones Stadium.

== Schedule ==
Date	Time	Opponent	Site	Result	Attendance	Source
September 20		vs. No. 20 Texas A&M	Cotton Bowl; Dallas, TX (rivalry)	W 15–14	28,000	
September 27	8:00 p.m.	West Texas State	Jones Stadium; Lubbock, TX	W 32–7	23,100	
October 4		at No. 17 Texas	Memorial Stadium; Austin, TX (rivalry)	L 7–12	33,000	
October 11		at TCU	Amon G. Carter Stadium; Fort Worth, TX (rivalry)	L 0–26	23,000	
October 18		Baylor	Jones Stadium; Lubbock, TX (rivalry)	L 7–26	24,000	
October 31		at Tulane	Tulane Stadium; New Orleans, LA	L 0–27	27,000	
November 8		Arizona	Jones Stadium; Lubbock, TX	W 33–6	13,000	
November 15		at Tulsa	Skelly Stadium; Tulsa, OK	L 7–9	12,278	
November 22		Arkansas^{†}	Jones Stadium; Lubbock, TX (rivalry)	L 8–14	22,500	
November 29		at Houston	Rice Stadium; Houston, TX (rivalry)	L 17–22	30,000	
^{†}Homecoming; Rankings from AP Poll released prior to the game; All times are in Central time
