= Seven-man line defense =

The seven-man line defenses are defensive alignments in American football which may refer to:

- 7–2–2 defense
- 7–1–2–1 defense
