= Ben Collins (American football) =

American football player and coach, college athletics administrator

Biographical details
- Born: April 1, 1921
- Died: November 20, 2014 (aged 93); El Paso, Texas, U.S.

Playing career
- 1940–1941: West Texas State
- Position: Halfback

Coaching career (HC unless noted)
- 1946–1956: Texas Western (assistant)
- 1957–1961: Texas Western

Administrative career (AD unless noted)
- 1959–1961: Texas Western

Head coaching record
- Overall: 18–29–1

Accomplishments and honors

Awards
- Third-team Little All-American (1941)

Benny Wesley Collins (April 1, 1921 – November 20, 2014) was an American college football player, coach, and athletics administrator. He served as the head football coach at Texas Western College—now the University of Texas at El Paso (UTEP)—from 1957 to 1961, compiling a record of 18–29–1.

Collins was a star halfback at West Texas State College—now West Texas A&M University in Canyon, Texas. In 1941, he finished second in the nation in scored points with 132, behind Bill Dudley (134) of Virginia. Collins was selected in the 20th round by the Detroit Lions as the 185th overall pick in the 1942 NFL draft.

Collins worked at Texas Western College from 1946 to 1961 and served as the school's athletic director and head football coach during his final five years. Collins is known for hiring renowned college basketball coach Don Haskins in 1961. In an article for the El Paso Times, Haskins is quoted saying, "[Collins] was behind me all the way."

Collins, 93, and his wife, Mary Gene, 86, were killed November 20, 2014, when they were struck by a pickup truck while crossing a busy street in El Paso.

== Head coaching record ==
Year	Team	Overall	Conference	Standing	Bowl/playoffs
Texas Western Miners (Border Conference) (1957–1961)
1957	Texas Western	6–3	3–2	T–3rd	
1958	Texas Western	2–7	1–4	T–5th	
1959	Texas Western	3–7	2–3	5th	
1960	Texas Western	4–5–1	2–3	4th	
1961	Texas Western	3–7	1–3	4th	
Texas Western:		18–29–1	9–15		
Total:		18–29–1			
