= 1958 Kansas State Wildcats football team =

American college football season

1958 Kansas State Wildcats football
- Conference: Big Seven Conference
- Record: 3–7 (2–4 Big 7)
- Head coach: Bus Mertes (4th season)
- Home stadium: Memorial Stadium

1958 Big Seven Conference football standings
	Conf.					Overall
Team	W		L		T	W		L		T
No. 5 Oklahoma $	6	–	0	–	0	10	–	1	–	0
Missouri	4	–	1	–	1	5	–	4	–	1
Colorado	4	–	2	–	0	6	–	4	–	0
Kansas	3	–	2	–	1	4	–	5	–	1
Kansas State	2	–	4	–	0	3	–	7	–	0
Nebraska	1	–	5	–	0	3	–	7	–	0
Iowa State	0	–	6	–	0	4	–	6	–	0
$ – Conference champion; Rankings from AP Poll

The 1958 Kansas State Wildcats football team represented Kansas State University in the 1958 college football season. The team's head football coach was Bus Mertes. The Wildcats played their home games in Memorial Stadium. The Wildcats finished the season with a 3–7 record with a 2–4 record in conference play. They finished in fifth place. The Wildcats scored just 110 points and gave up 192 points.

== Schedule ==
Date	Opponent	Site	Result	Attendance	Source
September 20	Wyoming*	Memorial Stadium; Manhattan, KS	W 17–14	12,000	
September 27	at Colorado	Folsom Field; Boulder, CO (rivalry)	L 3–13	37,500	
October 4	Utah State*	Memorial Stadium; Manhattan, KS	L 13–20	9,866	
October 11	at Nebraska	Memorial Stadium; Lincoln, NE (rivalry)	W 23–6	37,596	
October 18	Missouri^{†}	Memorial Stadium; Manhattan, KS	L 8–32	12,000	
October 25	at No. 9 Oklahoma	Oklahoma Memorial Stadium; Norman, OK	L 6–40	47,743	
November 1	Kansas	Memorial Stadium; Manhattan, KS (rivalry)	L 12–21	19,000	
November 8	at Oklahoma State*	Lewis Field; Stillwater, OK	L 7–14	12,000	
November 15	Iowa State	Memorial Stadium; Manhattan, KS (rivalry)	W 14–6	8,193	
November 22	at Michigan State*	Spartan Stadium; East Lansing, MI	L 7–26	39,032	
*Non-conference game; ^{†}Homecoming; Rankings from AP Poll released prior to the game; Source:
