= 1958 Arizona Wildcats football team =

American college football season

1958 Arizona Wildcats football
- Conference: Border Conference
- Record: 3–7 (2–1 Border)
- Head coach: Ed Doherty (2nd season)
- Captain: Ralph Hunsaker
- Home stadium: Arizona Stadium

1958 Border Conference football standings
	Conf.					Overall
Team	W		L		T	W		L		T
Hardin–Simmons $	4	–	0	–	0	6	–	5	–	0
Arizona State	4	–	1	–	0	7	–	3	–	0
Arizona	2	–	1	–	0	3	–	7	–	0
New Mexico A&M	1	–	3	–	0	4	–	6	–	0
Texas Western	1	–	4	–	0	2	–	7	–	0
West Texas State	1	–	4	–	0	1	–	9	–	0
$ – Conference champion

The 1958 Arizona Wildcats football team represented the University of Arizona in the Border Conference during the 1958 college football season. In their second and final season under head coach Ed Doherty, the Wildcats compiled a 3–7 record (2–1 against Border opponents) and were outscored by their opponents, 276 to 83. The team captain was Ralph Hunsaker. The team played its home games in Arizona Stadium in Tucson, Arizona.

The team's statistical leaders included Ralph Hunsaker with 1,129 passing yards, Billy Overall with 324 rushing yards, and Dave Hibbert with 606 receiving yards.

== Schedule ==
Date	Time	Opponent	Site	Result	Attendance	Source
September 20		Utah State*	Arizona Stadium; Tucson, AZ	W 7–6	18,005–18,947	
September 27		Iowa State*	Arizona Stadium; Tucson, AZ	L 0–14	18,608	
October 4		at Tulsa*	Skelly Field; Tulsa, OK	L 0–34	12,300	
October 11		No. 19 Colorado*	Arizona Stadium; Tucson, AZ	L 12–65	18,000	
October 18		at New Mexico*	Zimmerman Field; Albuquerque, NM	L 13–33	13,500	
October 25		Idaho*	Arizona Stadium; Tucson, AZ	L 16–24	18,000	
November 1	2:30 p.m.	West Texas State^{†}	Arizona Stadium; Tucson, AZ	W 15–8	13,000	
November 8		at Texas Tech*	Jones Stadium; Lubbock, TX	L 6–33	13,000	
November 15		at Texas Western	Kidd Field; El Paso, TX	W 14–12	8,000	
November 22		Arizona State	Arizona Stadium; Tucson, AZ (rivalry)	L 0–47	25,000	
*Non-conference game; ^{†}Homecoming; Rankings from AP Poll released prior to the game; All times are in Mountain time
