= 1958 Oklahoma State Cowboys football team =

American college football season

1958 Oklahoma State Cowboys football

Bluegrass Bowl champion

Bluegrass Bowl, W 15–6 vs. Florida State
- Conference: Independent

Ranking
- AP: No. 19
- Record: 8–3
- Head coach: Cliff Speegle (4th season)
- Home stadium: Lewis Field

1958 Southern major college football independents records
	Conf.			Overall
Team	W	L	T	W		L		T
No. 19 Oklahoma State		–		8	–	3	–	0
Florida State		–		7	–	4	–	0
Navy		–		6	–	3	–	0
Texas Tech		–		3	–	7	–	0
Miami (FL)		–		2	–	8	–	0
Rankings from AP poll

The 1958 Oklahoma State Cowboys football team represented Oklahoma State University–Stillwater as an independent during the 1958 college football season. In their fourth season under head coach Cliff Speegle, the Cowboys compiled an 8–3 record, were ranked No. 19 in the final AP Poll, and outscored opponents by a combined total of 201 to 134.

End Jim Wood was selected by the American Football Coaches Association as a first-team player on the 1958 College Football All-America Team; he was Oklahoma State's first All-American since 1946.

On offense, the 1958 team averaged 18.3 points scored, 196.6 rushing yards, and 81.0 passing yards per game. On defense, the team allowed an average of 12.2 points scored, 147.9 rushing yards and 86.5 passing yards per game. The team's statistical leaders included fullback Duane Wood with 492 rushing yards and 42 points scored, Dick Soergel with 539 passing yards, and Jim Wood with 273 receiving yards.

The team played its home games at Lewis Field in Stillwater, Oklahoma.

== Schedule ==
Date	Opponent	Rank	Site	TV	Result	Attendance	Source
September 20	at Denver		DU Stadium; Denver, CO	NBC	W 31–14	14,007–15,000	
September 27	North Texas State		Lewis Field; Stillwater, OK		W 21–14	16,500	
October 4	at Wichita		Veterans Field; Wichita, KS		W 43–12	14,015	
October 11	at Tulsa		Skelly Stadium; Tulsa, OK (rivalry)		L 16–24	20,509	
October 18	at No. 15 Houston		Rice Stadium; Houston, TX		W 7–0	28,000	
October 25	at Cincinnati		Nippert Stadium; Cincinnati, OH		W 19–14	21,000	
November 1	No. 13 Air Force^{†}		Lewis Field; Stillwater, OK		L 29–33	31,000	
November 8	Kansas State		Lewis Field; Stillwater, OK		W 14–7	12,000	
November 15	Kansas		Lewis Field; Stillwater, OK		W 6–3	15,000	
November 29	No. 3 Oklahoma		Lewis Field; Stillwater, OK (Bedlam Series)		L 0–7	37,014	
December 13	vs. Florida State	No. 19	Fairgrounds Stadium; Louisville, KY (Bluegrass Bowl)	ABC	W 15–6	7,000	
^{†}Homecoming; Rankings from AP Poll released prior to the game; Source:

== After the season ==
The 1959 NFL draft was held on December 1, 1958, and January 21, 1959. The following Cowboys were selected.

Round	Pick	Player	Position	NFL club
4	40	Jim Wood	End	Washington Redskins
12	134	Howard Keys	Center	Philadelphia Eagles
24	278	Gerry Benn	Tackle	Philadelphia Eagles
