= 1958 Texas Western Miners football team =

American college football season

1958 Texas Western Miners football
- Conference: Border Conference
- Record: 2–7 (1–4 Border)
- Head coach: Ben Collins (2nd season)
- Home stadium: Kidd Field

1958 Border Conference football standings
	Conf.					Overall
Team	W		L		T	W		L		T
Hardin–Simmons $	4	–	0	–	0	6	–	5	–	0
Arizona State	4	–	1	–	0	7	–	3	–	0
Arizona	2	–	1	–	0	3	–	7	–	0
New Mexico A&M	1	–	3	–	0	4	–	6	–	0
Texas Western	1	–	4	–	0	2	–	7	–	0
West Texas State	1	–	4	–	0	1	–	9	–	0
$ – Conference champion

The 1958 Texas Western Miners football team was an American football team that represented Texas Western College (now known as University of Texas at El Paso) as a member of the Border Conference during the 1958 college football season. In its second season under head coach Ben Collins, the team compiled a 2–7 record (1–4 against Border Conference opponents), finished in a tie for last place in the conference, and was outscored by a total of 179 to 92.

== Schedule ==
Date	Time	Opponent	Site	Result	Attendance	Source
September 20		at North Texas State	Fouts Field; Denton, TX	L 8–26	7,000–10,000	
September 27		New Mexico*	Kidd Field; El Paso, TX	W 15–6	7,000	
October 4		Abilene Christian*	Kidd Field; El Paso, TX	L 6–14	7,000	
October 11	7:00 p.m.	at West Texas State	Buffalo Stadium; Canyon, TX	W 29–12	5,000	
October 25		at New Mexico A&M	Memorial Stadium; Las Cruces, NM (rivalry)	L 16–17	7,000	
November 1		Hardin–Simmons^{†}	Kidd Field; El Paso, Texas	L 6–14	10,000	
November 8		at Arizona State	Sun Devil Stadium; Tempe, AZ	L 0–27	25,400	
November 15		Arizona	Kidd Field; El Paso, TX	L 12–14	8,000	
November 22		Trinity (TX)	Kidd Field; El Paso, TX	L 0–49		
*Non-conference game; ^{†}Homecoming; All times are in Mountain time
