= 1958 West Texas State Buffaloes football team =

American college football season

1958 West Texas State Buffaloes football
- Conference: Border Conference
- Record: 1–9 (1–4 Border)
- Head coach: Clark Jarnagin (1st season)
- Home stadium: Buffalo Stadium

1958 Border Conference football standings
	Conf.					Overall
Team	W		L		T	W		L		T
Hardin–Simmons $	4	–	0	–	0	6	–	5	–	0
Arizona State	4	–	1	–	0	7	–	3	–	0
Arizona	2	–	1	–	0	3	–	7	–	0
New Mexico A&M	1	–	3	–	0	4	–	6	–	0
Texas Western	1	–	4	–	0	2	–	7	–	0
West Texas State	1	–	4	–	0	1	–	9	–	0
$ – Conference champion

The 1958 West Texas State Buffaloes football team represented West Texas State College—now known as West Texas A&M University—as a member of the Border Conference during the 1958 college football season. Led by first-year head coach Clark Jarnagin, the Buffaloes compiled an overall record of 1–9 with a mark of 1–4 in conference play, tying for fifth place at the bottom of the Border Conference standings. West Texas State played home games at Buffalo Stadium in Canyon, Texas.

== Schedule ==
Date	Time	Opponent	Site	Result	Attendance	Source
September 20	7:00 p.m.	vs. VPI*	Victory Stadium; Roanoke, VA	L 12–28	7,500–9,000	
September 27	8:00 p.m.	at Texas Tech*	Jones Stadium; Lubbock, TX	L 7–32	23,100	
October 4	9:00 p.m.	at Arizona State	Sun Devil Stadium; Tempe, AZ	L 13–16	28,200	
October 11	8:00 p.m.	Texas Western^{†}	Buffalo Stadium; Canyon, TX	L 12–29	5,000	
October 18	8:00 p.m.	Trinity (TX)*	Buffalo Stadium; Canyon, TX	L 7–35		
October 25	8:00 p.m.	at No. 1 Mississippi Southern*	Faulkner Field; Hattiesburg, MS	L 0–15	14,000	
November 1	3:30 p.m.	at Arizona	Arizona Stadium; Tucson, AZ	L 8–15	13,000	
November 8	2:00 p.m.	Abilene Christian*	Buffalo Stadium; Canyon, TX	L 21–28	5,000	
November 15	8:00 p.m.	at Hardin–Simmons	Parramore Stadium; Abilene, TX	L 6–26	4,000–5,000	
November 22	2:00 p.m.	New Mexico A&M	Buffalo Stadium; Canyon, TX	W 39–32	2,500	
*Non-conference game; ^{†}Homecoming; Rankings from UPI Poll released prior to the game; All times are in Central time
