= 1958 Iowa State Cyclones football team =

American college football season

1958 Iowa State Cyclones football
- Conference: Big Seven Conference
- Record: 4–6 (0–6 Big 7)
- Head coach: Clay Stapleton (1st season)
- Captain: Gale Gibson
- Home stadium: Clyde Williams Field

1958 Big Seven Conference football standings
	Conf.					Overall
Team	W		L		T	W		L		T
No. 5 Oklahoma $	6	–	0	–	0	10	–	1	–	0
Missouri	4	–	1	–	1	5	–	4	–	1
Colorado	4	–	2	–	0	6	–	4	–	0
Kansas	3	–	2	–	1	4	–	5	–	1
Kansas State	2	–	4	–	0	3	–	7	–	0
Nebraska	1	–	5	–	0	3	–	7	–	0
Iowa State	0	–	6	–	0	4	–	6	–	0
$ – Conference champion; Rankings from AP Poll

The 1958 Iowa State Cyclones football team represented Iowa State College of Agricultural and Mechanic Arts (renamed Iowa State University in 1959) in the Big Seven Conference during the 1958 college football season. In their first year under head coach Clay Stapleton, the Cyclones compiled a 4–6 record (0–6 against conference opponents), finished in last place in the conference, and outscored their opponents by a combined total of 127 to 88. They played their home games at Clyde Williams Field in Ames, Iowa.

The team's regular starting lineup on offense consisted of left end Jim Winstead, left tackle Charles Martin, left guard Ray Fauser, center Arden Esslinger, right guard Jerry Donohue, right tackle Larry Van Der Heyden, right end Gale Gibson, quarterback Cliff Rick, left halfback Dwight Nichols, right halfback Tom Watkins, and fullback Chuck Lamson. Gale Gibson was the team captain.

The team's statistical leaders included Dwight Nichols with 815 rushing yards and 357 passing yards, Gale Gibson with 148 receiving yards, and Bob Harden with 42 points scored (seven touchdowns). Dwight Nichols was selected as a first-team all-conference player.

== Schedule ==
Date	Time	Opponent	Site	Result	Attendance	Source
September 20	1:30 pm	Drake*	Clyde Williams Field; Ames, IA	W 33–0	12,806	
September 27	9:00 pm	at Arizona*	Arizona Stadium; Tucson, AZ	W 14–0	18,608	
October 4	2:00 pm	at Nebraska	Memorial Stadium; Lincoln, NE (rivalry)	L 6–7	30,310	
October 11	1:30 pm	Kansas^{†}	Clyde Williams Field; Ames, IA	L 0–7	14,551–17,082	
October 18	1:30 pm	Colorado	Clyde Williams Field; Ames, IA	L 0–20	8,274	
October 25	1:30 pm	at Missouri	Memorial Stadium; Columbia, MO (rivalry)	L 6–14	22,464	
November 1	1:30 pm	South Dakota*	Clyde Williams Field; Ames, IA	W 53–0	6,337	
November 8	1:30 pm	No. 6 Oklahoma	Clyde Williams Field; Ames, IA	L 0–20	10,314	
November 15	1:30 pm	at Kansas State	Memorial Stadium; Manhattan, KS (rivalry)	L 6–14	8,193	
November 21	10:00 pm	at San Jose State*	Spartan Stadium; San Jose, CA	W 9–6	12,000	
*Non-conference game; ^{†}Homecoming; Rankings from AP Poll released prior to the game; All times are in Central time; Source:
