= 1958 Rice Owls football team =

American college football season

1958 Rice Owls football
- Conference: Southwest Conference
- Record: 5–5 (4–2 SWC)
- Head coach: Jess Neely (19th season)
- Home stadium: Rice Stadium

1958 Southwest Conference football standings
	Conf.					Overall
Team	W		L		T	W		L		T
No. 10 TCU $	5	–	1	–	0	8	–	2	–	1
No. 18 SMU	4	–	2	–	0	6	–	4	–	0
Rice	4	–	2	–	0	5	–	5	–	0
Texas	3	–	3	–	0	7	–	3	–	0
Arkansas	2	–	4	–	0	4	–	6	–	0
Texas A&M	2	–	4	–	0	4	–	6	–	0
Baylor	1	–	5	–	0	3	–	7	–	0
$ – Conference champion; Rankings from AP Poll

The 1958 Rice Owls football team represented Rice Institute during the 1958 college football season. The Owls were led by 19th-year head coach Jess Neely and played their home games at Rice Stadium in Houston, Texas. They competed as members of the Southwest Conference, finishing tied for second.

== Schedule ==
Date	Opponent	Rank	Site	Result	Attendance	Source
September 20	LSU*		Rice Stadium; Houston, TX	L 6–26	45,000	
September 27	at Stanford*		Stanford Stadium; Stanford, CA	W 30–7	29,000	
October 4	No. 14 Purdue*		Rice Stadium; Houston, TX	L 0–24	41,000	
October 11	at Arkansas		Razorback Stadium; Fayetteville, AR	W 24–0	22,000	
October 18	at No. 16 SMU		Cotton Bowl; Dallas, TX (rivalry)	W 13–7	39,000	
October 25	No. 4 Texas		Rice Stadium; Houston, TX (rivalry)	W 34–7	72,000	
November 8	No. 3 Army*^{†}	No. 13	Rice Stadium; Houston, TX	L 7–14	69,000	
November 15	Texas A&M	No. 17	Rice Stadium; Houston, TX	L 21–28	57,000	
November 22	No. 7 TCU		Rice Stadium; Houston, TX	L 10–21	55,000	
November 29	at Baylor		Baylor Stadium; Waco, TX	W 33–21	18,000	
*Non-conference game; ^{†}Homecoming; Rankings from AP Poll released prior to the game
