= 1958 Tulsa Golden Hurricane football team =

American college football season

1958 Tulsa Golden Hurricane football
- Conference: Missouri Valley Conference
- Record: 7–3 (2–2 MVC)
- Head coach: Bobby Dobbs (4th season)
- Home stadium: Skelly Stadium

1958 Missouri Valley Conference football standings
	Conf.					Overall
Team	W		L		T	W		L		T
North Texas State $	2	–	1	–	1	7	–	2	–	1
Cincinnati	1	–	1	–	2	6	–	2	–	2
Tulsa	2	–	2	–	0	7	–	3	–	0
Houston	2	–	2	–	0	5	–	4	–	0
Wichita	1	–	2	–	1	4	–	5	–	1
$ – Conference champion

The 1958 Tulsa Golden Hurricane football team represented the University of Tulsa during the 1958 college football season. In their fourth year under head coach Bobby Dodds, the Golden Hurricane compiled a 7–3 record (2–2 against Missouri Valley Conference opponents), and finished in third place in the conference. The team's statistical leaders included Jerry Keeling with 698 passing yards, Ronnie Morris with 623 rushing yards, and Billy Neal with 200 receiving yards.

== Schedule ==
Date	Opponent	Site	Result	Attendance	Source
September 20	Hardin–Simmons*	Skelly Stadium; Tulsa, OK	L 0–14	17,000	
September 27	at Arkansas*	Razorback Stadium; Fayetteville, AR	W 27–14	19,000	
October 4	Arizona*	Skelly Stadium; Tulsa, OK	W 24–16	12,300	
October 11	Oklahoma State*	Skelly Stadium; Tulsa, OK (rivalry)	W 24–16	20,509	
October 18	Drake*	Skelly Stadium; Tulsa, OK	W 59–0	11,137	
October 25	at North Texas State	Fouts Field; Denton, TX	L 7–8	14,000	
November 1	at Houston	Rice Stadium; Houston, TX	W 25–20	26,000	
November 8	at Cincinnati	Nippert Stadium; Cincinnati, OH	L 6–15	6,000–15,000	
November 15	Texas Tech*^{†}	Skelly Stadium; Tulsa, OK	W 9–7	12,278	
November 22	Wichita	Skelly Stadium; Tulsa, OK	W 25–6	10,818	
*Non-conference game; ^{†}Homecoming; Source:

== After the season ==
=== 1959 NFL draft ===
The following Golden Hurricane player was selected in the 1959 NFL draft following the season.

Round	Pick	Player	Position	NFL club
18	216	Opie Bandy	Tackle	Baltimore Colts
