= Cliff Speegle =

American football player, coach, and administrator (1917–1994)

Biographical details
- Born: November 5, 1917; Roosevelt, Oklahoma, U.S.
- Died: September 5, 1994 (aged 76); Dallas, Texas, U.S.

Playing career

Football
- 1938–1940: Oklahoma
- 1945: Chicago Cardinals
- Position: Center

Coaching career (HC unless noted)

Football
- 1941: Wewoka HS (OK)
- 1942: Capitol Hill HS (OK)
- 1946: Bacone
- 1947–1949: Oklahoma A&M (assistant)
- 1950: Northeast HS (OK)
- 1952–1953: Colgate (line)
- 1954: Edmonton Eskimos (line)
- 1955–1962: Oklahoma A&M/State
- 1963–1964: Toronto Argonauts (assistant)
- 1965–1966: Texas Western (assistant)

Basketball
- 1951–1952: Catholic HS (OK)

Administrative career (AD unless noted)
- 1941–1942: Wewoka HS (OK)
- 1942–1943: Capitol Hill HS (OK)
- 1946–1947: Bacone
- 1973–1982: SWC (commissioner)

Head coaching record
- Overall: 36–42–3 (college football); 6–2–1 (junior college football)
- Bowls: 1–0 (college)

Accomplishments and honors

Awards
- Second-team All-Big Six (1939)

Clifton M. Speegle (November 4, 1917 – September 5, 1994) was an American football player, coach, and college athletics administrator. He served as the head football coach at Oklahoma State University–Stillwater from 1955 to 1962, compiling a record of 36–42–3. During his tenure, Oklahoma State was 0–8 in the Bedlam Series, their rivalry game against the Oklahoma Sooners. Speegle was fired in 1962. He played college football at the University of Oklahoma from 1938 to 1940.

Speegle began his coaching career in 1941 as the head football coach at Wewoka High School in Wewoka, Oklahoma. The next year he served in the same capacity at Capitol Hill High School in Oklahoma City. Speegle served at Del Rio, Texas as an instructor in the United States Army Air Forces during World War II. In 1945, he played professionally in the National Football League (NFL) with the Chicago Cardinals. Speegle was hired as the head football coach at Bacone College in Muskogee, Oklahoma in 1946. He was also the athletic director at Bacone before leaving the school in 1947.

From 1947 to 1949, Speegle was an assistant football coach at Oklahoma Agricultural and Mechanical College—now known as Oklahoma State University–Stillwater—under head football coach Jim Lookabaugh. In 1950, he was the head football coach at Northeast High School in Oklahoma. He left Northeast after a season to go into the insurance business, but returned to coaching in the winter of 1951–52 as head basketball coach at Catholic High School in Oklahoma City. In 1952, Hal Lahar, newly appointed as the head football coach at Colgate University, hired Speegle as his line coach.

== Head coaching record ==
=== College football ===
Year	Team	Overall	Conference	Standing	Bowl/playoffs	AP^{#}
Oklahoma A&M Aggies (Missouri Valley Conference) (1955–1956)
1955	Oklahoma A&M	2–8	1–3	T–4th		
1956	Oklahoma A&M	3–5–2	2–1–1	T–2nd		
Oklahoma State Cowboys (Independent) (1957–1959)
1957	Oklahoma State	6–3–1				
1958	Oklahoma State	8–3			W Bluegrass	19
1959	Oklahoma State	6–4				
Oklahoma State Cowboys (Big Eight Conference) (1960–1962)
1960	Oklahoma State	3–7	2–5	T–6th		
1961	Oklahoma State	4–6	2–5	T–6th		
1962	Oklahoma State	4–6	2–5	6th		
Oklahoma A&M/State:		36–42–3	9–19–1			
Total:		36–42–3				
^{#}Rankings from final AP Poll.

=== Junior college football ===
Year	Team	Overall	Conference	Standing
Bacone Warriors (Oklahoma Junior College Conference) (1946)
1946	Bacone	6–2–1	5–1–1	2nd
Bacone:		6–2–1	5–1–1	
Total:		6–2–1		
