= 1958 Texas Longhorns football team =

American college football season

1958 Texas Longhorns football
- Conference: Southwest Conference
- Record: 7–3 (3–3 SWC)
- Head coach: Darrell Royal (2nd season)
- Home stadium: Memorial Stadium

1958 Southwest Conference football standings
| | Conf. | | | | | Overall |
| Team | W | | L | | T | W | | L | | T |
|---|---|---|---|---|---|---|---|---|---|---|
| No. 10 TCU $ | 5 | – | 1 | – | 0 | 8 | – | 2 | – | 1 |
| No. 18 SMU | 4 | – | 2 | – | 0 | 6 | – | 4 | – | 0 |
| Rice | 4 | – | 2 | – | 0 | 5 | – | 5 | – | 0 |
| Texas | 3 | – | 3 | – | 0 | 7 | – | 3 | – | 0 |
| Arkansas | 2 | – | 4 | – | 0 | 4 | – | 6 | – | 0 |
| Texas A&M | 2 | – | 4 | – | 0 | 4 | – | 6 | – | 0 |
| Baylor | 1 | – | 5 | – | 0 | 3 | – | 7 | – | 0 |
$ – Conference champion; Rankings from AP Poll

The 1958 Texas Longhorns football team was an American football team that represented the University of Texas (now known as the University of Texas at Austin) as a member of the Southwest Conference (SWC) during the 1958 college football season. In their second year under head coach Darrell Royal, the Longhorns compiled an overall record of 7–3, with a mark of 3–3 in conference play, and finished fourth in the SWC.

== Schedule ==
| Date | Opponent | Rank | Site | Result | Attendance | Source |
|---|---|---|---|---|---|---|
| September 20 | Georgia* | No. 11 | Memorial Stadium; Austin, TX | W 13–8 | 32,000 | |
| September 27 | at Tulane* | | Tulane Stadium; New Orleans, LA | W 21–20 | 35,000 | |
| October 4 | Texas Tech* | No. 17 | Memorial Stadium; Austin, TX (rivalry) | W 12–7 | 32,000 | |
| October 11 | vs. No. 2 Oklahoma* | No. 16 | Cotton Bowl; Dallas, TX (rivalry) | W 15–14 | 75,000 | |
| October 18 | Arkansas | No. 7 | Memorial Stadium; Austin, TX (rivalry) | W 24–6 | 45,000 | |
| October 25 | at Rice | No. 4 | Rice Stadium; Houston, TX (rivalry) | L 7–34 | 72,000 | |
| November 1 | SMU | No. 16 | Memorial Stadium; Austin, TX | L 10–26 | 58,000 | |
| November 8 | at Baylor | | Baylor Stadium; Waco, TX (rivalry) | W 20–15 | 28,000 | |
| November 15 | at No. 9 TCU | | Amon G. Carter Stadium; Fort Worth, TX (rivalry) | L 8–22 | 39,000 | |
| November 27 | Texas A&M | | Memorial Stadium; Austin, TX (rivalry) | W 27–0 | 52,000 | |
*Non-conference game; Rankings from AP Poll released prior to the game
