= Duane Wood =

American gridiron football player (1937–2012)

No. 48
- Position: Cornerback

Personal information
- Born: September 20, 1937; Wilburton, Oklahoma
- Died: July 23, 2012 (aged 74); McAlester, Oklahoma

Career information
- College: Oklahoma State

Career history
- Hamilton Tiger-Cats (1959–1960); Dallas Texans/Kansas City Chiefs (1960–1964); Edmonton Eskimos (1965)

Awards and highlights
- CFL All-Star (1959); AFL All-Star (1963); AFL Champion (1962)
- Stats at Pro Football Reference

Duane Wood (September 20, 1937 – July 23, 2012) was a former college and professional American football cornerback.

== Early life and college career ==
Born in Wilburton, Oklahoma, Duane Wood was the son of Edgar Scott and Jessie (Ray) Wood. A multi-sport athlete at Wilburton High School, playing football, baseball and basketball as well as running track, Wood received a football scholarship to Oklahoma State University and appeared as both a running back and a defensive back. He scored all but one of OSU's points in their 15-6 Bluegrass Bowl victory over Florida State in 1958 (the only year the game was played). Duane married his high school sweetheart Saundra Callahan on June 29, 1957; they remained married until her death in 2004.

== Professional career ==
Prior to the NFL Draft, (It was later learned he was to be drafted by the Pittsburgh Steelers), Wood headed north to the Canadian Football League in 1959. He signed a contract with the Hamilton Tiger-Cats immediately following; and, after being named the offensive MVP of the Blue-Grey Game in Montgomery AL.

In his rookie season, Wood was named to the CFL All-Star Team, with 237 yards rushing on offense; on defense, he recorded three interceptions, including one returned for a touchdown. Wood was also an excellent kick returner, averaging 9.3 yards on 51 punt returns in an era without blocking on punt returns.

After playing six games with the Tiger-Cats in 1960 (mostly on defense), Wood jumped to the Dallas Texans (Now Kansas City Chiefs) of the brand-new American Football League (AFL). He played in the 1962 AFL Championship game in Houston TX, a 20–17 thrilling Texans win over the two-time AFL Champion Houston Oilers. The game was the longest Professional American Football Championship game up to that time; almost one and one-half quarters of "sudden death". The winning field goal for the Texans was kicked by Tommy Brooker, University of Alabama.

In the 1963 AFL season, Wood moved with the team to Kansas City and was selected to the American Football League All-Star game in San Diego CA. in all, he played five seasons with the franchise. In 1965, he headed back to Canada to finish his career with the Edmonton Eskimos. In Edmonton, he was reunited with one of his Oklahoma State University coaches, the late, great Neil Armstrong.

== After football ==
Upon retiring from football, Wood returned to Wilburton to manage several private businesses: a clothing store; a bowling alley; and, a recreation center/eatery. Duane worked for three years with a dredging service on the Arkansas River in Ft. Smith, Arkansas. He was awarded the "Medal of Commendation" from the US Army Corps of Engineers for single-handedly rescuing and saving the lives of three people whose boat had capsized on the river.

Wood subsequently returned to his hometown of Wilburton. He was employed by the Kiamichi Rural Electric Cooperative. He retired as the general manager after twenty years of service.

Wood died on July 23, 2012, at the age of 74.

== See also ==
- Other American Football League players
