= 1958 Hardin–Simmons Cowboys football team =

American college football season

1958 Hardin–Simmons Cowboys football

Border champion

Sun Bowl, L 6–14 vs. Wyoming
- Conference: Border Conference
- Record: 6–5 (4–0 Border)
- Head coach: Sammy Baugh (4th season)
- Home stadium: Parramore Stadium

1958 Border Conference football standings
| | Conf. | | | | | Overall |
| Team | W | | L | | T | W | | L | | T |
|---|---|---|---|---|---|---|---|---|---|---|
| Hardin–Simmons $ | 4 | – | 0 | – | 0 | 6 | – | 5 | – | 0 |
| Arizona State | 4 | – | 1 | – | 0 | 7 | – | 3 | – | 0 |
| Arizona | 2 | – | 1 | – | 0 | 3 | – | 7 | – | 0 |
| New Mexico A&M | 1 | – | 3 | – | 0 | 4 | – | 6 | – | 0 |
| Texas Western | 1 | – | 4 | – | 0 | 2 | – | 7 | – | 0 |
| West Texas State | 1 | – | 4 | – | 0 | 1 | – | 9 | – | 0 |
$ – Conference champion

The 1958 Hardin–Simmons Cowboys football team was an American football team that represented Hardin–Simmons University in the Border Conference during the 1958 college football season. In its fourth year under head coach Sammy Baugh, the team compiled a 6–5 record (4–0 against conference opponents), won the conference championship, lost to Wyoming in the 1958 Sun Bowl, and outscored all opponents by a total of 176 to 141. The team played its three home games at Parramore Stadium, also known as Parramore Field.

The team's statistical leaders included quarterback Harold Stephens with 706 passing yards, fullback Pete Hart with 785 rushing yards, and end Sammy Oates with 402 receiving yards. Five of the team's players were honored on the 1958 All-Border Conference football team: Hart; Oates; guard Joe Biggs, halfback Dewey Bohling, and tackle Ted Edmondson.

Five Hardin-Simmons players were named to the 1958 All-Border Conference football team: guard Joe Biggs; halfback Dewey Bohling; tackle Ted Edmondson; fullback Pete Hart; and end Sammy Oates.

== Schedule ==
| Date | Time | Opponent | Site | Result | Attendance | Source |
|---|---|---|---|---|---|---|
| September 20 | | at Tulsa* | Skelly Field; Tulsa, OK | W 14–0 | 17,000 | |
| September 27 | | at Baylor* | Baylor Stadium; Waco, TX | L 7–14 | 16,000 | |
| October 4 | | at No. 13 LSU* | Tiger Stadium; Baton Rouge, LA | L 6–20 | 45,000 | |
| October 11 | | at Arizona State | Sun Devil Stadium; Tempe, AZ | W 14–6 | 26,261 | |
| October 18 | | at No. 8 Ole Miss* | Hemingway Stadium; Oxford, MS | L 0–24 | 18,500 | |
| October 25 | | Wichita*^{†} | Parramore Stadium; Abilene, TX | W 13–6 | 8,000 | |
| November 1 | | at Texas Western | Kidd Field; El Paso, TX | W 14–6 | 10,000 | |
| November 8 | | at Arkansas* | War Memorial Stadium; Little Rock, AR | L 15–60 | 19,000 | |
| November 15 | 8:00 p.m. | West Texas State | Parramore Stadium; Abilene, TX | W 26–6 | 4,000–5,000 | |
| November 28 | | New Mexico A&M | Parramore Stadium; Abilene, TX | W 26–20 | | |
| December 31 | | vs. Wyoming* | Kidd Field; El Paso, TX (Sun Bowl) | L 6–14 | 12,000–13,000 | |
*Non-conference game; ^{†}Homecoming; Rankings from Coaches' Poll released prior to the game; All times are in Central time
