= Bluegrass Bowl =

American college football game

Bluegrass Bowl (defunct)
- Game program cover
- Stadium: Cardinal Stadium
- Location: Louisville, Kentucky
- Operated: 1958

The Bluegrass Bowl was a college football bowl game that was played only once, on December 13, 1958, at Cardinal Stadium (later known as "Old Cardinal Stadium") in Louisville, Kentucky. The Oklahoma State Cowboys defeated the Florida State Seminoles, 15–6.

== Background ==
The NCAA approved an annual "Bluegrass Football Bowl" in January 1958. Game organizers expected the Bluegrass Bowl to be an annual event in Louisville, starting with the December 1958 contest. As of mid-November, it was reported that the bowl's selection committee were considering eight teams: Air Force, Alabama, Florida State, Kentucky, Pittsburgh, Rutgers, Syracuse, and Vanderbilt. Shortly thereafter, it was reported that the first choices were Kentucky and Alabama. Both the 1958 Wildcats and the 1958 Crimson Tide finished their regular seasons with 5–4–1 records. Alabama was led by Bear Bryant in his first season as head coach of the Crimson Tide; he had previously been the head coach at Kentucky for eight seasons (1946–1953).

The Wildcats, whose usual home field was McLean Stadium in Lexington, had received poor treatment from the Louisville crowd at Cardinal Stadium in their season opener, a 51–0 win over Hawaii. In an 18–12 vote, the team's lettermen opted to decline the Bluegrass Bowl invitation. Kentucky's players voting to turn down bowl bids was nothing new: they said no to the Gator Bowl in 1953, despite a 7–2–1 record in Bryant's final season in Lexington, and again in 1954 after going 7–3. Alabama also declined the Bluegrass Bowl, (Note: In Bryant's 25 seasons as Alabama's head coach, this was the only Crimson Tide team that did not play in a bowl game.) and it appeared that the game might have to be postponed. However, on December 1, it was announced that Oklahoma State and Florida State had accepted invitations.

Bowl organizers successfully negotiated a national television contract with American Broadcasting Company (ABC), with a 100-mile (160 km) blackout. At the time, ABC held only a secondary affiliation in Louisville with primary CBS affiliate WHAS-TV. A crowd of 15,000, less than half capacity, was expected for the inaugural game. Tickets were priced at $6.50 ($70.84 in 2024) each, though due to unenthusiastic demand they were being sold for $1.50 ($16.35 in 2024) on the day of the game. Parking cost 25 cents ($2.72 in 2024).

== Game results ==
Date	Winning Team		Losing Team		Location
December 13, 1958	#19 Oklahoma State	15	Florida State	6	Fairgrounds Stadium, Louisville, KY

== 1958 Bluegrass Bowl ==
1958 Bluegrass Bowl
Florida State Seminoles	Oklahoma State Cowboys
(7–3)	(7–3)
Independent	Independent
6	15
Head coach: Tom Nugent	Head coach: Cliff Speegle
AP NR	AP 19
	1	2	3	4	Total
Florida State	0	0	0	6	6
Oklahoma State	0	7	8	0	15
- Date: December 13, 1958
- Season: 1958
- Stadium: Cardinal Stadium
- Location: Louisville, Kentucky
- Attendance: 7,000 (3,152 paid)

United States TV coverage
- Network: ABC
- Announcers: Howard Cosell, Harry Wismer

Oklahoma State entered the game ranked #19 in the AP Poll, while Florida State was unranked. Florida State was an independent with a 7–3 regular season record; Oklahoma State was also 7–3 as an independent, having left the Missouri Valley Conference after the 1956 season and not joining the Big Eight Conference until 1960. Florida State, in their final season under head coach Tom Nugent, was appearing in the program's third bowl game. Oklahoma State, coached by Cliff Speegle, was appearing in its fourth bowl game.

The game was played at Cardinal Stadium on the grounds of the Kentucky Exposition Center, just behind Freedom Hall, where the 1958 NCAA University Division basketball tournament had been held in March. Kickoff was at 2:00 p.m., with a game time temperature of 20 °F (−7 °C), and falling. The playing field was icy and slippery, causing the players to forego cleats and wear tennis shoes instead. The cold weather on top of the general indifference to the contest kept the attendance low; crowd estimates were in the 5,000–10,000 range, and many accounts state that just over 7,000 attended.

In the first quarter, Florida State took two drives into Oklahoma State territory but missed 16 and 23-yard field goal attempts.

Early in the second quarter, Oklahoma State halfback Duane Wood ran 17 yards for a score, putting the Cowboys up 7–0. Late in the second quarter, Oklahoma State again drove deep into Florida State territory, but on fourth-and-five, Florida State defender Ron Hinson stripped the ball from Oklahoma State's Forrest Campbell just a foot from the goal line.

Florida State fumbled twice in the third quarter. Oklahoma State took the second fumble for a 10-play, 39-yard touchdown drive capped by another Duane Wood touchdown run. Wood then caught a pass for a two-point conversion to give Oklahoma State a 15–0 lead.

Florida State scored a fourth-quarter touchdown without a successful conversion, giving Oklahoma State a 15–6 win.

== Media coverage ==
ABC's coverage of the otherwise forgettable Bluegrass Bowl was notable for two reasons: it was the last broadcast of Harry Wismer and the first national telecast to feature Howard Cosell. It was also the first-ever national broadcast of a Florida State football game. Due to the cold weather, the press covering the game deserted the windowless press box and all crowded into a single enclosed, heated room with windows for the game.

== Aftermath ==
In January 1959, officials stated that paid attendance for the game was 3,152 with $18,132.50 ($197,617 in 2024) of actual income. The Bluegrass Bowl organizers proclaimed the game a success despite the low attendance and stated that the game would be played again; however, it was not.

The 1959 edition was scheduled for December 19, but was canceled on November 29 after Alabama and Kentucky both declined invitations, as they had done for the inaugural edition of the bowl. Alabama played in the 1959 Liberty Bowl, while Kentucky, having finished the season with a losing record, did not play in a bowl game.

== Statistics ==
	1	2	3	4	Total
Florida State	0	0	0	6	6
Oklahoma State	0	7	8	0	15

Scoring Summary

- OSU - D. Wood 17 yd. run (J. Wood kick), 14:31
- OSU - D. Wood 1 yd. run (D. Wood pass from Soergel), :07
- FSU - Meyer 39 yd. pass from Majors (Prinzi run failed), 13:52

Statistics

Statistics	FSU	OSU
First downs	12	13
Yards rushing	100	298
Yards passing	185	77
Total yards	285	375
Punts-Average	2-30	5-30
Fumbles-Lost	2-2	1-1
Interceptions	4	1
Penalties-Yards	3-25	6-65

Individual Statistics
Rushing

Florida State

- Pickard galloped 14 times for 44 yards. Vic Prinzi rushed 7 times for 30 yards. Renn ran 2 times for 13 yards. Majors went for 12 yards on 3 carries. Whitehead had just one yard on 1 carry. McCormack gained 0 yards on one try.

Oklahoma State

- Campbell rushed 26 times for 130 yards. D. Wood went for 81 yards on 17 carries for two touchdowns. Wiggins galloped 12 times for 59 yards. Banfield ran 7 times for 34 yards. Rundele had 3 carries for 7 yards. Sewell ran for 3 yards on 4 carries. Wagner had just 1 yard on his one carry. Cross and Soergel both lost yards on their only carries, the former losing 5 and the latter losing 12.

Passing

Florida State

- Majors went 5 for 9 passing with a touchdown and interception each and 116 yards. Prinzi went 3 for 8 with 3 interceptions and 44 yards. McCormack went 1 for 4 passing with 25 yards. Lastly, Renn went 0 for 1 passing.

Oklahoma State

- Soergel went 6 for 12 passing with 1 interception and 77 yards.

Receiving

Florida State

- Romeo had 3 catches for 62 yards. Espenship caught 2 passes for 22 yards. Renn received 2 catches for 48 yards. Meyer snatched 1 pass for 39 yards, which proved to be the only Seminole touchdown. Lastly, Pasqual had 1 catch for 14 yards.

Oklahoma State

- Wiggins had 2 catches for 38 yards. D. Wood caught 2 passes for 23 yards. Harkey received 1 catch for 7 yards. Lastly, J. Wood had 1 catch for 9 yards.

== See also ==
- History of Louisville, Kentucky
- List of college bowl games
