= 1958 Kansas Jayhawks football team =

American college football season

1958 Kansas Jayhawks football
- Conference: Big Seven Conference
- Record: 4–5–1 (3–2–1 Big 7)
- Head coach: Jack Mitchell (1st season)
- Captains: Homer Floyd; Bob Marshall
- Home stadium: Memorial Stadium

1958 Big Seven Conference football standings
| | Conf. | | | | | Overall |
| Team | W | | L | | T | W | | L | | T |
|---|---|---|---|---|---|---|---|---|---|---|
| No. 5 Oklahoma $ | 6 | – | 0 | – | 0 | 10 | – | 1 | – | 0 |
| Missouri | 4 | – | 1 | – | 1 | 5 | – | 4 | – | 1 |
| Colorado | 4 | – | 2 | – | 0 | 6 | – | 4 | – | 0 |
| Kansas | 3 | – | 2 | – | 1 | 4 | – | 5 | – | 1 |
| Kansas State | 2 | – | 4 | – | 0 | 3 | – | 7 | – | 0 |
| Nebraska | 1 | – | 5 | – | 0 | 3 | – | 7 | – | 0 |
| Iowa State | 0 | – | 6 | – | 0 | 4 | – | 6 | – | 0 |
$ – Conference champion; Rankings from AP Poll

The 1958 Kansas Jayhawks football team represented the University of Kansas in the Big Seven Conference during the 1958 college football season. In their first season under head coach Jack Mitchell, the Jayhawks compiled a 4–5–1 record (3–2–1 against conference opponents), finished fourth in the Big Seven Conference, and were outscored by all opponents by a combined total of 175 to 87. They played their home games at Memorial Stadium in Lawrence, Kansas.

The team's statistical leaders included Homer Floyd with 391 rushing yards and 307 receiving yards and Larry McKown with 219 passing yards. Homer Floyd and Bob Marshall were the team captains.

== Schedule ==
| Date | Opponent | Site | Result | Attendance | Source |
|---|---|---|---|---|---|
| September 20 | No. 8 TCU* | Memorial Stadium; Lawrence, KS | L 0–42 | 20,000 | |
| September 27 | at Oregon State* | Multnomah Stadium; Portland, OR | L 0–12 | 28,115 | |
| October 4 | Colorado | Memorial Stadium; Lawrence, KS | L 0–31 | 22,000 | |
| October 11 | at Iowa State | Clyde Williams Field; Ames, IA | W 7–0 | 14,551–17,082 | |
| October 18 | No. 11 Oklahoma | Memorial Stadium; Lawrence, KS | L 0–43 | 30,000 | |
| October 25 | Tulane* | Memorial Stadium; Lawrence, KS | W 14–9 | 17,000–20,000 | |
| November 1 | at Kansas State | Memorial Stadium; Manhattan, KS (rivalry) | W 21–12 | 19,000 | |
| November 8 | Nebraska | Memorial Stadium; Lawrence, KS (rivalry) | W 29–7 | 23,760 | |
| November 15 | at Oklahoma State* | Lewis Field; Stillwater, OK | L 3–6 | 15,000 | |
| November 22 | at Missouri | Memorial Stadium; Columbia, MO (Border War) | T 13–13 | 32,000 | |
*Non-conference game; Rankings from AP Poll released prior to the game; Source:
