= 1958 TCU Horned Frogs football team =

American college football season

1958 TCU Horned Frogs football

SWC champion

Cotton Bowl Classic, T 0–0 vs. Air Force
- Conference: Southwest Conference

Ranking
- Coaches: No. 9
- AP: No. 10
- Record: 8–2–1 (5–1 SWC)
- Head coach: Abe Martin (6th season)
- Offensive scheme: Meyer spread
- Home stadium: Amon G. Carter Stadium

1958 Southwest Conference football standings
	Conf.					Overall
Team	W		L		T	W		L		T
No. 10 TCU $	5	–	1	–	0	8	–	2	–	1
No. 18 SMU	4	–	2	–	0	6	–	4	–	0
Rice	4	–	2	–	0	5	–	5	–	0
Texas	3	–	3	–	0	7	–	3	–	0
Arkansas	2	–	4	–	0	4	–	6	–	0
Texas A&M	2	–	4	–	0	4	–	6	–	0
Baylor	1	–	5	–	0	3	–	7	–	0
$ – Conference champion; Rankings from AP Poll

The 1958 TCU Horned Frogs football team represented Texas Christian University (TCU) in the 1958 college football season. The Horned Frogs finished the season 8–2–1 overall and 5–1 in the Southwest Conference. The team was coached by Abe Martin in his sixth year as head coach. The Frogs played their home games in Amon G. Carter Stadium, which is located on campus in Fort Worth, Texas. They were invited to the Cotton Bowl Classic where they played Air Force, with the game ending in a 0–0 tie.

== Schedule ==
Date	Opponent	Rank	Site	TV	Result	Attendance	Source
September 20	at Kansas*	No. 8	Memorial Stadium; Lawrence, KS		W 42–0	20,000	
September 27	at Iowa*	No. 6	Iowa Stadium; Iowa City, IA		L 0–17	54,500	
October 4	Arkansas		Amon G. Carter Stadium; Fort Worth, TX		W 12–7	25,000	
October 11	Texas Tech*		Amon G. Carter Stadium; Fort Worth, TX (rivalry)		W 26–0	23,000	
October 18	at Texas A&M	No. 20	Kyle Field; College Station, TX (rivalry)		W 24–8	26,500	
November 1	Baylor	No. 18	Amon G. Carter Stadium; Fort Worth, TX (rivalry)		W 22–0	35,000	
November 8	Marquette*	No. 11	Amon G. Carter Stadium; Fort Worth, TX		W 36–8	15,000	
November 15	Texas	No. 9	Amon G. Carter Stadium; Fort Worth, TX (rivalry)		W 22–8	39,000	
November 22	at Rice	No. 7	Rice Stadium; Houston, TX		W 21–10	55,000	
November 29	at SMU	No. 7	Cotton Bowl; Dallas, TX (rivalry)		L 13–20	52,000	
January 1, 1959	vs. No. 8 Air Force*	No. 10	Cotton Bowl; Dallas, TX (Cotton Bowl)	CBS	T 0–0	75,504	
*Non-conference game; Rankings from AP Poll released prior to the game
