= 1958 Houston Cougars football team =

American college football season

1958 Houston Cougars football
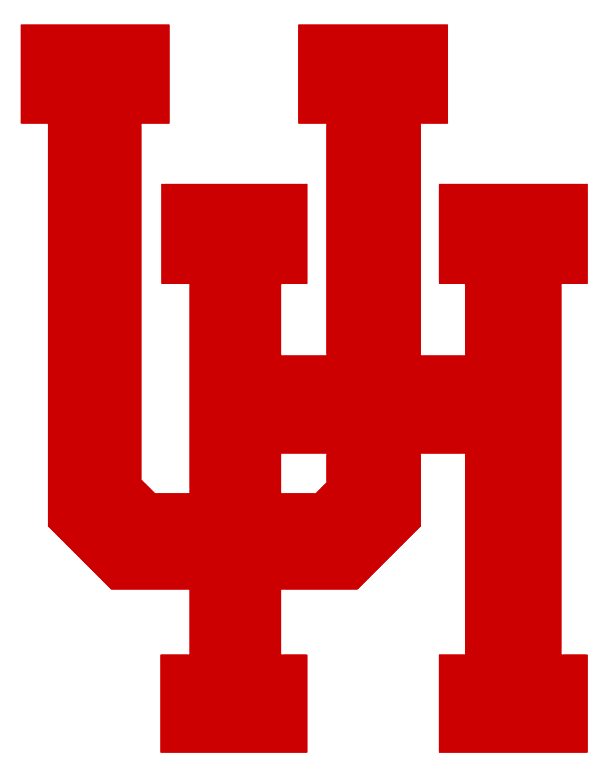
- Conference: Missouri Valley Conference
- Record: 5–4 (2–2 MVC)
- Head coach: Hal Lahar (2nd season)
- Home stadium: Rice Stadium

1958 Missouri Valley Conference football standings
	Conf.					Overall
Team	W		L		T	W		L		T
North Texas State $	2	–	1	–	1	7	–	2	–	1
Cincinnati	1	–	1	–	2	6	–	2	–	2
Tulsa	2	–	2	–	0	7	–	3	–	0
Houston	2	–	2	–	0	5	–	4	–	0
Wichita	1	–	2	–	1	4	–	5	–	1
$ – Conference champion

The 1958 Houston Cougars football team represented the University of Houston as a member if the Missouri Valley Conference (MVC) during the 1958 college football season. In Hal Lahar's second year as head coach, the Cougars compiled an overall record of 5–4 record with a mark of 2–2 in conference play, tying for second place in the MVC, and outscored opponents 209 to 161.

== Schedule ==
Date	Opponent	Rank	Site	Result	Attendance	Source
September 27	Texas A&M*		Rice Stadium; Houston, TX	W 39–7	65,131	
October 4	at Cincinnati	No. 19	Nippert Stadium; Cincinnati, OH	W 34–13	18,000–22,000	
October 11	Wichita	No. T–19	Rice Stadium; Houston, TX	W 44–0	25,000	
October 18	Oklahoma State*	No. 15	Rice Stadium; Houston, TX	L 0–7	28,000	
November 1	Tulsa^{†}		Rice Stadium; Houston, TX	L 20–25	26,000	
November 8	at No. 9 Ole Miss*		Hemingway Stadium; Oxford, MS	L 7–56	20,000	
November 15	at North Texas State		Fouts Field; Denton, TX	L 6–10	10,000	
November 21	at Miami (FL)*		Burdine Stadium; Miami, FL	W 37–26	24,822	
November 29	Texas Tech*		Rice Stadium; Houston, TX (rivalry)	W 22–17	7,500	
*Non-conference game; ^{†}Homecoming; Rankings from AP Poll released prior to the game
