= 1958 Oklahoma Sooners football team =

American college football season

1958 Oklahoma Sooners football

Big 7 champion Orange Bowl champion

Orange Bowl, W 21–6 vs. Syracuse
- Conference: Big Seven Conference

Ranking
- Coaches: No. 5
- AP: No. 5
- Record: 10–1 (7–0 Big Seven)
- Head coach: Bud Wilkinson (12th season)
- Captains: Bob Harrison; Joe Rector
- Home stadium: Oklahoma Memorial Stadium

1958 Big Seven Conference football standings
| | Conf. | | | | | Overall |
| Team | W | | L | | T | W | | L | | T |
|---|---|---|---|---|---|---|---|---|---|---|
| No. 5 Oklahoma $ | 6 | – | 0 | – | 0 | 10 | – | 1 | – | 0 |
| Missouri | 4 | – | 1 | – | 1 | 5 | – | 4 | – | 1 |
| Colorado | 4 | – | 2 | – | 0 | 6 | – | 4 | – | 0 |
| Kansas | 3 | – | 2 | – | 1 | 4 | – | 5 | – | 1 |
| Kansas State | 2 | – | 4 | – | 0 | 3 | – | 7 | – | 0 |
| Nebraska | 1 | – | 5 | – | 0 | 3 | – | 7 | – | 0 |
| Iowa State | 0 | – | 6 | – | 0 | 4 | – | 6 | – | 0 |
$ – Conference champion; Rankings from AP Poll

The 1958 Oklahoma Sooners football team represented the University of Oklahoma during the 1958 college football season. They played their home games at Oklahoma Memorial Stadium and competed as members of the Big Seven Conference. They were coached by head coach Bud Wilkinson.

== Schedule ==
| Date | Opponent | Rank | Site | TV | Result | Attendance | Source |
|---|---|---|---|---|---|---|---|
| September 27 | No. 13 West Virginia* | No. 2 | Oklahoma Memorial Stadium; Norman, OK | | W 47–14 | 55,432 | |
| October 4 | Oregon* | No. 1 | Oklahoma Memorial Stadium; Norman, OK | | W 6–0 | 61,700 | |
| October 11 | vs. No. 16 Texas* | No. 2 | Cotton Bowl; Dallas, TX (Red River Shootout) | | L 14–15 | 75,780 | |
| October 18 | at Kansas | No. 11 | Memorial Stadium; Lawrence, KS | NBC | W 43–0 | 30,000 | |
| October 25 | Kansas State | No. 9 | Oklahoma Memorial Stadium; Norman, OK | | W 40–6 | 47,743 | |
| November 1 | at No. 9 Colorado | No. 7 | Folsom Field; Boulder, CO | | W 23–7 | 47,000 | |
| November 8 | at Iowa State | No. 6 | Clyde Williams Field; Ames, IA | | W 20–0 | 10,314 | |
| November 15 | Missouri | No. 6 | Oklahoma Memorial Stadium; Norman, OK (rivalry) | NBC | W 39–0 | 54,268 | |
| November 22 | Nebraska | No. 4 | Oklahoma Memorial Stadium; Norman, OK (rivalry) | | W 40–7 | 44,740 | |
| November 29 | at Oklahoma State | No. 3 | Lewis Field; Stillwater, OK (Bedlam Series) | | W 7–0 | 37,014 | |
| January 1, 1959 | vs. No. 9 Syracuse* | No. 5 | Burdine Stadium; Miami, FL (Orange Bowl) | | W 21–6 | 75,281 | |
*Non-conference game; Rankings from AP Poll released prior to the game; Source:

== Rankings ==
Ranking movements Legend: ██ Increase in ranking ██ Decrease in ranking ( ) = First-place votes
| | Week | | | | | | | | | | | |
| Poll | Pre | 1 | 2 | 3 | 4 | 5 | 6 | 7 | 8 | 9 | 10 | Final |
|---|---|---|---|---|---|---|---|---|---|---|---|---|
| AP | 2 (23) | 2 (12) | 1 (66) | 2 (24) | 11 | 9 (1) | 7 (5) | 6 (8) | 6 (3) | 4 (22) | 3 (9) | 5 (10) |

== NFL draft ==
The following players were drafted into the National Football League following the season.

| Round | Pick | Player | Position | NFL team |
|---|---|---|---|---|
| 1 | 5 | Dave Baker | Quarterback | San Francisco 49ers |
| 2 | 17 | Bob Harrison | Center | San Francisco 49ers |
| 20 | 237 | Ross Coyle | End | Los Angeles Rams |
