= 1958 Cincinnati Bearcats football team =

American college football season

1958 Cincinnati Bearcats football
- Conference: Missouri Valley Conference
- Record: 6–2–2 (1–1–2 MVC)
- Head coach: George Blackburn (4th season)
- Captain: Bob Del Rosa
- Home stadium: Nippert Stadium

1958 Missouri Valley Conference football standings
	Conf.					Overall
Team	W		L		T	W		L		T
North Texas State $	2	–	1	–	1	7	–	2	–	1
Cincinnati	1	–	1	–	2	6	–	2	–	2
Tulsa	2	–	2	–	0	7	–	3	–	0
Houston	2	–	2	–	0	5	–	4	–	0
Wichita	1	–	2	–	1	4	–	5	–	1
$ – Conference champion

The 1958 Cincinnati Bearcats football team represented the University of Cincinnati in the Missouri Valley Conference (MVC) during the 1958 college football season. Led by fourth-year head coach George Blackburn, the Bearcats compiled an overall record of 6–2–2 with a mark of 1–1–2 in conference play, placing in a three-way tie for second in the MVC. The team played home games at Nippert Stadium in Cincinnati.

== Schedule ==
Date	Time	Opponent	Site	Result	Attendance	Source
September 20		Dayton*	Nippert Stadium; Cincinnati, OH	W 14–0	12,000	
September 27		Wichita	Nippert Stadium; Cincinnati, OH	T 16–16	17,000	
October 4		No. 19 Houston	Nippert Stadium; Cincinnati, OH	L 13–34	18,000–22,000	
October 11	2:00 p.m.	Xavier*	Nippert Stadium; Cincinnati, OH (rivalry)	W 14–8	26,000	
October 18		at Pacific (CA)*	Pacific Memorial Stadium; Stockton, CA	W 12–6	28,642	
October 25		Oklahoma State*^{†}	Nippert Stadium; Cincinnati, OH	L 14–19	21,000	
November 1		at North Texas State	Fouts Field; Denton, TX	T 8–8	5,000	
November 8		Tulsa	Nippert Stadium; Cincinnati, OH	W 15–6	6,000–15,000	
November 15		at Marquette*	Milwaukee County Stadium; Milwaukee, WI	W 15–0	4,053	
November 27		No. 2 (small) Miami (OH)*	Nippert Stadium; Cincinnati, OH (Victory Bell)	W 18–7	22,000	
*Non-conference game; ^{†}Homecoming; Rankings from AP Poll released prior to the game; All times are in Eastern time; Source:
