= 1958 Baylor Bears football team =

American college football season

1958 Baylor Bears football
- Conference: Southwest Conference
- Record: 3–7 (1–5 SWC)
- Head coach: Sam Boyd (3rd season)
- Captains: Buddy Humphrey; Billy Joe Kelly
- Home stadium: Baylor Stadium

1958 Southwest Conference football standings
	Conf.					Overall
Team	W		L		T	W		L		T
No. 10 TCU $	5	–	1	–	0	8	–	2	–	1
No. 18 SMU	4	–	2	–	0	6	–	4	–	0
Rice	4	–	2	–	0	5	–	5	–	0
Texas	3	–	3	–	0	7	–	3	–	0
Arkansas	2	–	4	–	0	4	–	6	–	0
Texas A&M	2	–	4	–	0	4	–	6	–	0
Baylor	1	–	5	–	0	3	–	7	–	0
$ – Conference champion; Rankings from AP Poll

The 1958 Baylor Bears football team represented Baylor University as a member of the Southwest Conference (SWC) during the 1958 college football season. Led by Sam Boyd in his third and final season as head coach, the Bears compiled an overall record of 3–7 with a mark of 1–5 in conference play, placing last out of seven teams in the SWC. Baylor played home games at Baylor Stadium in Waco, Texas.

== Schedule ==
Date	Opponent	Site	Result	Attendance	Source
September 20	at Arkansas	War Memorial Stadium; Little Rock, AR	W 12–0	38,000	
September 27	Hardin–Simmons*	Baylor Stadium; Waco, TX	W 14–7	16,000	
October 4	Miami (FL)*	Baylor Stadium; Waco, TX	L 8–14	20,000	
October 11	at Duke*	Duke Stadium; Durham, NC	L 7–12	26,000	
October 18	at Texas Tech*	Jones Stadium; Lubbock, TX (rivalry)	W 26–7	24,000	
October 25	Texas A&M^{†}	Baylor Stadium; Waco, TX (rivalry)	L 27–33	38,000	
November 1	at No. 18 TCU	Amon G. Carter Stadium; Fort Worth, TX (rivalry)	L 0–22	35,000	
November 8	Texas	Baylor Stadium; Waco, TX (rivalry)	L 15–20	28,000	
November 22	at SMU	Cotton Bowl; Dallas, TX	L 29–33	26,500	
November 29	Rice	Baylor Stadium; Waco, TX	L 21–33	18,000	
*Non-conference game; ^{†}Homecoming; Rankings from AP Poll released prior to the game
