= 1958 Colorado Buffaloes football team =

American college football season

1958 Colorado Buffaloes football
- Conference: Big Seven Conference
- Record: 6–4 (4–2 Big 7)
- Head coach: Dallas Ward (11th season)
- Captain: Game captains
- Home stadium: Folsom Field

1958 Big Seven Conference football standings
	Conf.					Overall
Team	W		L		T	W		L		T
No. 5 Oklahoma $	6	–	0	–	0	10	–	1	–	0
Missouri	4	–	1	–	1	5	–	4	–	1
Colorado	4	–	2	–	0	6	–	4	–	0
Kansas	3	–	2	–	1	4	–	5	–	1
Kansas State	2	–	4	–	0	3	–	7	–	0
Nebraska	1	–	5	–	0	3	–	7	–	0
Iowa State	0	–	6	–	0	4	–	6	–	0
$ – Conference champion; Rankings from AP Poll

The 1958 Colorado Buffaloes football team was an American football team that represented the University of Colorado in the Big Seven Conference during the 1958 college football season. Led by 11th-year head coach Dallas Ward, the Buffaloes compiled an overall record of 6–4 with a mark of 4–2 in conference play, placing third in the Big 7. The team played its home games on campus at Folsom Field in Boulder, Colorado.

Colorado opened with five wins, but then dropped four of five, including intrastate losses at home to Colorado State and Air Force to conclude the season. Ward was fired by the university regents in January, and stayed at CU as a professor of physical education. He was succeeded in February by Sonny Grandelius, an assistant at Michigan State under Duffy Daugherty.

== Schedule ==
Date	Time	Opponent	Rank	Site	Result	Attendance	Source
September 27		Kansas State		Folsom Field; Boulder, CO (rivalry)	W 13–3	37,500	
October 4		at Kansas		Memorial Stadium; Lawrence, KS	W 31–0	22,000	
October 11		at Arizona*	No. 19	Arizona Stadium; Tucson, AZ	W 65–12	18,000	
October 18		at Iowa State		Clyde Williams Field; Ames, IA	W 20–0	8,274	
October 25		Nebraska^{†}	No. 12	Folsom Field; Boulder, CO (rivalry)	W 27–16	40,271	
November 1		No. 7 Oklahoma	No. 9	Folsom Field; Boulder, CO	L 7–23	47,000	
November 8		at Missouri		Memorial Stadium; Columbia, MO	L 9–33	31,500	
November 15	2:00 p.m.	at Utah*		Ute Stadium; Salt Lake City, UT (rivalry)	W 7–0	4,300	
November 22		Colorado State*		Folsom Field; Boulder, CO (rivalry)	L 14–15	23,000	
November 29		No. 8 Air Force*		Folsom Field; Boulder, CO	L 14–20	40,000	
*Non-conference game; ^{†}Homecoming; Rankings from AP Poll released prior to the game; All times are in Mountain time; Source:

== Coaching staff ==
Assistant coaches: Marshall Wells, Frank Prentup, Jack Nelson, Will Walls
