= 1958 SMU Mustangs football team =

American college football season

1958 SMU Mustangs football
- Conference: Southwest Conference

Ranking
- Coaches: No. 18
- AP: No. 18
- Record: 6–4 (4–2 SWC)
- Head coach: Bill Meek (2nd season)
- Captain: Tom Koening
- Home stadium: Cotton Bowl

1958 Southwest Conference football standings
| | Conf. | | | | | Overall |
| Team | W | | L | | T | W | | L | | T |
|---|---|---|---|---|---|---|---|---|---|---|
| No. 10 TCU $ | 5 | – | 1 | – | 0 | 8 | – | 2 | – | 1 |
| No. 18 SMU | 4 | – | 2 | – | 0 | 6 | – | 4 | – | 0 |
| Rice | 4 | – | 2 | – | 0 | 5 | – | 5 | – | 0 |
| Texas | 3 | – | 3 | – | 0 | 7 | – | 3 | – | 0 |
| Arkansas | 2 | – | 4 | – | 0 | 4 | – | 6 | – | 0 |
| Texas A&M | 2 | – | 4 | – | 0 | 4 | – | 6 | – | 0 |
| Baylor | 1 | – | 5 | – | 0 | 3 | – | 7 | – | 0 |
$ – Conference champion; Rankings from AP Poll

The 1958 SMU Mustangs football team represented Southern Methodist University (SMU) as a member of the Southwest Conference (SWC) during the 1958 college football season. Led by second-year head coach Bill Meek, the Mustangs compiled an overall record of 6–4 with a conference mark of 4–2, tying for second place in the SWC.

== Schedule ==
| Date | Opponent | Rank | Site | Result | Attendance | Source |
|---|---|---|---|---|---|---|
| September 27 | at No. 1 Ohio State* | No. 20 | Ohio Stadium; Columbus, OH | L 20–23 | 83,113 | |
| October 4 | No. 7 Notre Dame* | No. 17 | Cotton Bowl; Dallas, TX | L 6–14 | 61,500 | |
| October 11 | at Missouri* | No. 18 | Memorial Stadium; Columbia, MO | W 32–19 | 29,000 | |
| October 18 | Rice | No. 16 | Cotton Bowl; Dallas, TX (rivalry) | L 7–13 | 39,000 | |
| October 25 | No. 17 Georgia Tech* | | Cotton Bowl; Dallas, TX | W 20–0 | 27,000 | |
| November 1 | at No. 16 Texas | | Memorial Stadium; Austin, TX | W 26–10 | 58,000 | |
| November 8 | Texas A&M | No. 20 | Cotton Bowl; Dallas, TX | W 33–0 | 53,000 | |
| November 15 | at Arkansas | No. 15 | Razorback Stadium; Fayetteville, AR | L 6–13 | 28,000 | |
| November 22 | Baylor | | Cotton Bowl; Dallas, TX | W 33–29 | 26,500 | |
| November 29 | No. 7 TCU | | Cotton Bowl; Dallas, TX (rivalry) | W 20–13 | 52,000 | |
*Non-conference game; Rankings from AP Poll released prior to the game
