= 1958 Missouri Tigers football team =

American college football season

1958 Missouri Tigers football
- Conference: Big Seven Conference
- Record: 5–4–1 (4–1–1 Big 7)
- Head coach: Dan Devine (1st season)
- Home stadium: Memorial Stadium

1958 Big Seven Conference football standings
	Conf.					Overall
Team	W		L		T	W		L		T
No. 5 Oklahoma $	6	–	0	–	0	10	–	1	–	0
Missouri	4	–	1	–	1	5	–	4	–	1
Colorado	4	–	2	–	0	6	–	4	–	0
Kansas	3	–	2	–	1	4	–	5	–	1
Kansas State	2	–	4	–	0	3	–	7	–	0
Nebraska	1	–	5	–	0	3	–	7	–	0
Iowa State	0	–	6	–	0	4	–	6	–	0
$ – Conference champion; Rankings from AP Poll

The 1958 Missouri Tigers football team was an American football team that represented the University of Missouri in the Big Seven Conference (Big 7) during the 1958 college football season. Led by first-year head coach Dan Devine, the team went 5–4–1 overall (4–1–1 in conference, second) and outscored its opponents 164 to 141. The six home games were played on campus at Memorial Stadium in Columbia, Missouri.

Mizzou's statistical leaders included Mel West with 642 rushing yards and 642 yards of total offense, Phil Snowden with 548 passing yards and 37 points scored, and Danny LaRose with 215 receiving yards.

Hired in mid-December 1957, Devine was previously the head coach for three seasons at Arizona State College in the Border Conference. He led the Sun Devils to an undefeated 10–0 record during his final season in Tempe, finishing twelfth in both polls. Devine stayed at Missouri for thirteen seasons, then left for the Green Bay Packers of the National Football League (NFL).

== Schedule ==
Date	Opponent	Site	Result	Attendance	Source
September 20	Vanderbilt*	Memorial Stadium; Columbia, MO	L 8–12	24,000	
September 27	Idaho*	Memorial Stadium; Columbia, MO	W 14–10	18,000	
October 4	at Texas A&M*	Kyle Field; College Station, TX	L 0–12	15,000	
October 11	No. 18 SMU*	Memorial Stadium; Columbia, MO	L 19–32	29,000	
October 18	at Kansas State	Memorial Stadium; Manhattan, KS	W 32–8	12,000	
October 25	Iowa State	Memorial Stadium; Columbia, MO (rivalry)	W 14–6	22,464	
November 1	at Nebraska	Memorial Stadium; Lincoln, NE (rivalry)	W 31–0	31,816	
November 8	Colorado	Memorial Stadium; Columbia, MO	W 33–9	31,500	
November 15	at No. 6 Oklahoma	Oklahoma Memorial Stadium; Norman, OK (rivalry)	L 0–39	54,268	
November 22	Kansas	Memorial Stadium; Columbia, MO (Border War)	T 13–13	32,000	
*Non-conference game; Rankings from AP Poll released prior to the game; Source:
