= 1958 Arkansas Razorbacks football team =

American college football season

1958 Arkansas Razorbacks football
- Conference: Southwest Conference
- Record: 4–6 (2–4 SWC)
- Head coach: Frank Broyles (1st season)
- Captains: Richard Bell; Bill Michael
- Home stadium: Razorback Stadium; War Memorial Stadium

1958 Southwest Conference football standings
	Conf.					Overall
Team	W		L		T	W		L		T
No. 10 TCU $	5	–	1	–	0	8	–	2	–	1
No. 18 SMU	4	–	2	–	0	6	–	4	–	0
Rice	4	–	2	–	0	5	–	5	–	0
Texas	3	–	3	–	0	7	–	3	–	0
Arkansas	2	–	4	–	0	4	–	6	–	0
Texas A&M	2	–	4	–	0	4	–	6	–	0
Baylor	1	–	5	–	0	3	–	7	–	0
$ – Conference champion; Rankings from AP Poll

The 1958 Arkansas Razorbacks football team represented the University of Arkansas during the 1958 college football season. It was their first season under head coach Frank Broyles.

== Schedule ==
Date	Opponent	Site	Result	Attendance	Source
September 20	Baylor	War Memorial Stadium; Little Rock, AR	L 0–12	38,000	
September 27	Tulsa*	Razorback Stadium; Fayetteville, AR	L 14–27	19,000	
October 4	at TCU	Amon G. Carter Stadium; Fort Worth, TX	L 7–12	25,000	
October 11	Rice	Razorback Stadium; Fayetteville, AR	L 0–24	22,000	
October 18	No. 7 Texas	Memorial Stadium; Austin, TX (rivalry)	L 6–24	45,000	
October 25	No. 6 Ole Miss*	War Memorial Stadium; Little Rock, AR (rivalry)	L 12–14	36,000	
November 1	at Texas A&M	Kyle Field; College Station, TX (rivalry)	W 21–8		
November 8	Hardin–Simmons*	War Memorial Stadium; Little Rock, AR	W 60–15	19,000	
November 15	No. 15 SMU^{†}	Razorback Stadium	W 13–6	28,000	
November 22	at Texas Tech*	Jones Stadium; Lubbock, TX (rivalry)	W 14–8	22,500	
*Non-conference game; ^{†}Homecoming; Rankings from AP Poll released prior to the game

== Game summaries ==
=== Hardin–Simmons ===
The game featured two kickoffs returned 100 yards each for touchdowns by Jim Mooty and Billy Kyser, both of Arkansas.

== Personnel ==
=== Coaching staff ===
Head coach: Frank Broyles

Assistants: Doug Dickey (DB), Merrill Green (OB), Jim Mackenzie (DL), Wilson Matthews (DE/LB), Dixie White (OL), Steed White (OE)

=== Roster ===
- Richard Bell
- Red Childress, end
- Billy Gilbow, guard
- Billy Luplow, guard
- Billy Kyser
- Barry Switzer, center
- Jim Mooty, back
- Bill Michael, tackle

== Honors and awards ==
All-SWC

- Jim Mooty (1st Team)
- Billy Gilbow (Dallas Morning News All Southwest Conference Team)
- Most valuable Senior Razorback at Homecoming: Billy Gilbow, Blytheville, Arkansas

Crip Hall Homecoming Performance by a Senior: Billy Gilbow
