= 5–2 defense =

American football defensive formation

Base 5–2 defense

In American football, the 5–2 defense is a defensive alignment consisting of five down linemen and two linebackers.

== 5–2 Eagle ==
Linebackers also may play on the line of scrimmage, hold up offensive ends and still cover their pass zones when the quarterback fades to pass. This defensive scheme was employed with great success by Coach "Greasy" Neale of the Philadelphia Eagles' professional football team.

— Don Faurot, Secrets of the "Split T" Formation, 1950, p. 235

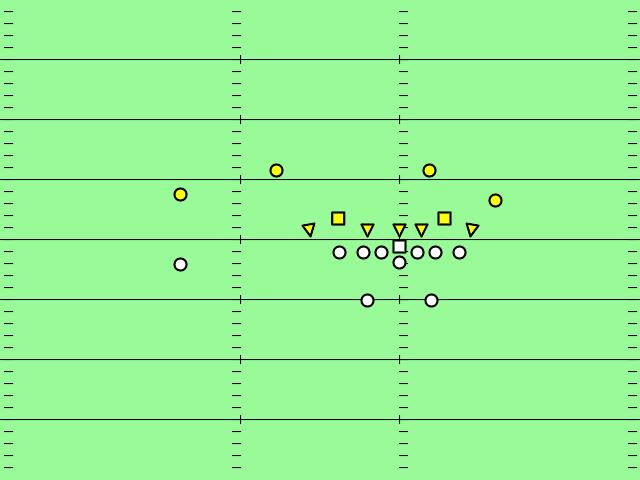
5–2 Eagle defense. Yellow triangles are linemen, yellow squares are linebackers, yellow circles are defensive backs.

Historically, there are two significant variations of the 5–2 defense in professional and college football. The first is the defense created by Earle (Greasy) Neale. This defense was prominent in the National Football League from the late 1940s through the middle 1950s and was a precursor defense to Buddy Ryan's 46 defense. Paul Brown describes the defense as having a tight five man line, and linebackers who were to jam offensive ends as they came off the line. Brown goes on to say that the use of four defensive backs was innovative at the time. By 1950, the base defense of NFL teams were five man line defenses, either the 5–2 Eagle or the 5–3–3.

The 5–2 Eagle has a (passing) hole in the middle of the defense, usually dealt with by having outside linebackers jam the ends. Offenses countered by using slotbacks instead of tight ends. Consequently, teams began to experiment, around 1954, with pulling the middle guard back a couple yards and putting him in a two-point stance. The success of the New York Giants in 1956 with their base 4–3 defense led to a rapid conversion to the 4–3 in 1957. Almost all teams switched to the new defense at that time.

Note that in this defense, if you pull the middle guard and replace him with a middle linebacker, you get to an early version of the 4–3 defense. Conversely, if you take a 4–3 defense and replace the middle linebacker with a middle guard, then you convert a 4–3 into a 5–2 Eagle. This latter switch was historically significant in at least one game. In 1972, George Allen pulled his middle linebacker, replacing him with defensive lineman Manny Sistrunk, defeating the Green Bay Packers in a playoff game with his unexpected five man front, shutting down the Packers' powerful rushing combination of John Brockington and MacArthur Lane.

== 5–2 Oklahoma ==
"If I contributed anything to football of an original nature," Dad said, "It was the Oklahoma 5–2."

— Jay Wilkinson and Gretchen Hirsch, Bud Wilkinson: An Intimate Portrait of an American Legend, 1994

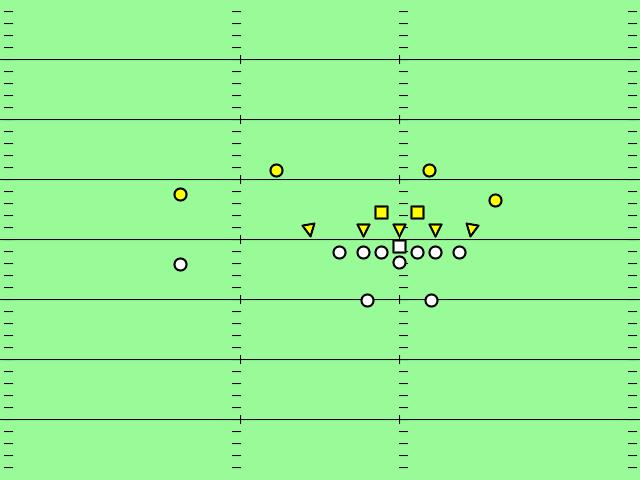
5–2 Oklahoma defense. Yellow triangles are linemen, yellow squares are linebackers, yellow circles are defensive backs

The second significant version of the 5–2 defense is the 5–2 defense that Bud Wilkinson developed while he was a head coach at Oklahoma. The latter defense, also called the 5–2 Oklahoma, is supposed to have arisen from Bud's exposure to Earle Neale's 5–2 defense in the 1948 College All-Star game after the Philadelphia Eagles' first championship. Bud took the defense back with him to Oklahoma and adapted lineman and linebacker positions to better handle the college offenses of the time. In particular, the split between the middle guard, or nose tackle, and the other defensive tackles grew wider in the Oklahoma, and the linebackers were positioned a couple yards behind the line, and facing the opponent's offensive guards.

Another account of the origin comes from Pop Ivy, an assistant coach at the time. He says the Sooners were previously playing the 5–2 Eagle defense. Bud Wilkinson felt the linebackers were too far removed from the center of the action to effectively read keys. By moving the linebackers towards the center, and the defensive tackles on the outside shoulder of the offensive tackles, they could then key on the offensive guards. This account dates the first use of the Oklahoma to 1949.

Bud Wilkinson himself has said the defense evolved from the 7–2–2 defense that was still in use in college football in the 1930s. The ends of the 7–2 fell off and assumed more of a linebacker technique.

The 5–2 Oklahoma, with defensive ends given the ability to drop back into pass coverage, is indistinguishable from the 3–4 defense. It should not come as a surprise then that coaches from Oklahoma (Chuck Fairbanks with the New England Patriots) and Oklahoma State (Bum Phillips with the Houston Oilers) were among the first to introduce the 3–4 into the NFL as a base defense.

The 5–2 (or 5–4, or 3–4, or Okie, or 50 defense) is a popular defense at all levels of coaching, in part because it has simple reads, is easy to coach, and allows coaches to concentrate on technique. By the 1990s, however, coaches were having issues with the demands of finding players who could handle the nose guard and defensive tackle positions of this defense. These require "two gap" players of exceptional size and power. Further, the "read then react" nature of the defense made it doubly difficult for teams of smaller size. As a consequence, teams began switching back to more modern four man line defenses, of the kind pioneered by the Miami Hurricanes of college football and the Jimmy Johnson-led Dallas Cowboys.

== Bibliography ==
Carroll, Bob, Gershman, Michael, Neft, David, and Thorn, John, Total Football II: The Official Encyclopedia of the National Football League, HarperCollins, 1999, Chapter 17.

Halas, George, Morgan, Gwen, and Veysey, Arthur, Halas by Halas, McGraw-Hill, 1979.

Jones, Gomer, and Wilkinson, Bud, Modern Defensive Football, Prentice-Hall, 1957, Chapter 9.

Keith, Harold, Forty Seven Straight: The Wilkinson Years at Oklahoma, University of Oklahoma Press, 1984.

Kirwan, Pat and Seigerman, David, Take Your Eye Off the Ball, Triumph Books, 2010.

Owen, Steve, My Kind of Football, David McKay, 1952.

Rand, Jonathan, Riddell Presents The Gridiron's Greatest Linebackers, Sports Publishing, 2003.

Ryan, Rex and Walker, Jeff, Coaching Football's 46 Defense, Coaches Choice, 2000.

Wilkinson, Jay and Hirsch, Gretchen, Bud Wilkinson: An Intimate Portrait of an American Legend, Sagamore Publishing, 1994.

Wilkinson, Bud, Football: Defense, Sports Illustrated, 1973.

Zimmerman, Paul, The New Thinking Man's Guide to Pro Football, Simon and Schuster, 1984, Chapter 6.
