= 1958 Texas A&M Aggies football team =

American college football season

1958 Texas A&M Aggies football
- Conference: Southwest Conference
- Record: 4–6 (2–4 SWC)
- Head coach: Jim Myers (1st season)
- Home stadium: Kyle Field

1958 Southwest Conference football standings
	Conf.					Overall
Team	W		L		T	W		L		T
No. 10 TCU $	5	–	1	–	0	8	–	2	–	1
No. 18 SMU	4	–	2	–	0	6	–	4	–	0
Rice	4	–	2	–	0	5	–	5	–	0
Texas	3	–	3	–	0	7	–	3	–	0
Arkansas	2	–	4	–	0	4	–	6	–	0
Texas A&M	2	–	4	–	0	4	–	6	–	0
Baylor	1	–	5	–	0	3	–	7	–	0
$ – Conference champion; Rankings from AP Poll

The 1958 Texas A&M Aggies football team represented Texas A&M University in the 1958 college football season as a member of the Southwest Conference (SWC). The Aggies were led by head coach Jim Myers in his first season and finished with a record of four wins and six losses (4–6 overall, 2–4 in the SWC).

== Schedule ==
Date	Opponent	Rank	Site	Result	Attendance	Source
September 20	vs. Texas Tech*	No. 20	Cotton Bowl; Dallas, TX (rivalry)	L 14–15	28,000	
September 27	at Houston*		Rice Stadium; Houston, TX	L 7–39	65,131	
October 4	Missouri*		Kyle Field; College Station, TX	W 12–0	15,000	
October 11	at Maryland*		Byrd Stadium; College Park, MD	W 14–10	23,000	
October 18	No. 20 TCU		Kyle Field; College Station, TX (rivalry)	L 8–24	26,500	
October 25	at Baylor		Baylor Stadium; Waco, TX (rivalry)	W 33–27	38,000	
November 1	Arkansas		Kyle Field; College Station, TX (rivalry)	L 8–21		
November 8	at No. 20 SMU		Cotton Bowl; Dallas, TX	L 0–33	53,000	
November 15	at No. 17 Rice		Rice Stadium; Houston, TX	W 28–21	57,000	
November 27	at Texas		Memorial Stadium; Austin, TX (rivalry)	L 0–27	52,000	
*Non-conference game; Rankings from AP Poll released prior to the game

== Roster ==
- QB Charlie Milstead, Jr.
