= 1958 Wichita Shockers football team =

American college football season

1958 Wichita Shockers football
- Conference: Missouri Valley Conference
- Record: 4–5–1 (1–2–1 MVC)
- Head coach: Woody Woodard (2nd season)
- Home stadium: Veterans Field

1958 Missouri Valley Conference football standings
	Conf.					Overall
Team	W		L		T	W		L		T
North Texas State $	2	–	1	–	1	7	–	2	–	1
Cincinnati	1	–	1	–	2	6	–	2	–	2
Tulsa	2	–	2	–	0	7	–	3	–	0
Houston	2	–	2	–	0	5	–	4	–	0
Wichita	1	–	2	–	1	4	–	5	–	1
$ – Conference champion

The 1958 Wichita Shockers football team, sometimes known as the Wheatshockers, was an American football team that represented Wichita University (now known as Wichita State University) as a member of the Missouri Valley Conference during the 1958 college football season. In its second season under head coach Woody Woodard, the team compiled a 4–5–1 record (1–2–1 against conference opponents), finished in last place out of five teams in the MVC, and was outscored by a total of 200 to 148. The team played its home games at Veterans Field, now known as Cessna Stadium.

== Schedule ==
Date	Opponent	Site	Result	Attendance	Source
September 20	Bowling Green*	Veterans Field; Wichita, KS	L 14–20	10,107	
September 27	at Cincinnati*	Nippert Stadium; Cincinnati, OH	T 16–16	17,000	
October 4	Oklahoma State*	Veterans Field; Wichita, KS	L 12–43	14,015	
October 11	at No. T–19 Houston	Rice Stadium; Houston, TX	L 0–44	25,000	
October 25	at Hardin–Simmons*	Parramore Stadium; Abilene, TX	L 6–13	8,000	
November 1	Villanova*	Veterans Field; Wichita, KS	W 21–6	9,280	
November 8	North Texas State	Veterans Field; Wichita, KS	W 15–13	7,839	
November 15	at Drake*	Drake Stadium; Des Moines, IA	W 32–8	1,500	
November 22	George Washington*	Veterans Field; Wichita, KS	W 26–12	8,808	
November 27	at Tulsa	Skelly Stadium; Tulsa, OK	L 6–25	10,818	
*Non-conference game; Source:
