= 1958 Arizona State Sun Devils football team =

American college football season

1958 Arizona State Sun Devils football
- Conference: Border Conference
- Record: 7–3 (4–1 Border)
- Head coach: Frank Kush (1st season)
- MVP: John Hangartner
- Home stadium: Goodwin Stadium, Sun Devil Stadium

1958 Border Conference football standings
	Conf.					Overall
Team	W		L		T	W		L		T
Hardin–Simmons $	4	–	0	–	0	6	–	5	–	0
Arizona State	4	–	1	–	0	7	–	3	–	0
Arizona	2	–	1	–	0	3	–	7	–	0
New Mexico A&M	1	–	3	–	0	4	–	6	–	0
Texas Western	1	–	4	–	0	2	–	7	–	0
West Texas State	1	–	4	–	0	1	–	9	–	0
$ – Conference champion

The 1958 Arizona State Sun Devils football team was an American football team that represented Arizona State University in the Border Conference during the 1958 college football season. In their first season under head coach Frank Kush, the Sun Devils compiled a 7–3 record (4–1 against Border opponents) and outscored their opponents 271 to 131.

The team's statistical leaders included John Hangartner with 1,208 passing yards, Leon Burton with 642 rushing yards, and Bill Spanko with 463 receiving yards. Hangartner was selected as the most valuable player of both the 1957 and 1958 Arizona State teams.

Previously the line coach under Dan Devine, Kush was promoted the previous December and signed a one-year contract at a salary of $10,000.

== Schedule ==
Date	Time	Opponent	Site	Result	Attendance	Source
September 20		Hawaii*	Goodwin Stadium; Tempe, AZ	W 47–6	19,000	
September 27		at Pacific (CA)*	Pacific Memorial Stadium; Stockton, CA	L 16–34	31,008	
October 4	8:00 p.m.	West Texas State	Sun Devil Stadium; Tempe, AZ	W 16–13	28,200	
October 11		Hardin–Simmons	Sun Devil Stadium; Tempe, AZ	L 6–14	26,261	
October 18		San Jose State*	Sun Devil Stadium; Tempe, AZ	L 20–21	29,000	
October 25		at Detroit*	University of Detroit Stadium; Detroit, MI	W 27–6	14,715	
November 1		New Mexico A&M	Sun Devil Stadium; Tempe, AZ	W 23–19	27,300	
November 8		Texas Western^{†}	Sun Devil Stadium; Tempe, AZ	W 27–0	25,400	
November 22		at Arizona	Arizona Stadium; Tucson, AZ (rivalry)	W 47–0	25,000	
November 29		Marquette*	Sun Devil Stadium; Tempe, AZ	W 42–18	24,000	
*Non-conference game; ^{†}Homecoming; All times are in Mountain time

== Game summaries ==
=== Detroit ===
During a flight layover in Kansas City, head coach Frank Kush had the team deplane and practice on field adjacent to the airport. Kush then proceeded to bench the seniors for the first half of the game.

== Personnel ==
1958 Arizona State Sun Devils football team roster
Players
Coaches
Offense

Pos.	#	Name	Class
		Leon Burton
C		Dave Fronner
G		Ken Kerr

Defense

Pos.	#	Name	Class

Special teams

Pos.	#	Name	Class

Head coach

- Frank Kush

Coordinators/assistant coaches

- Chuck Fairbanks

Legend

- (C) Team captain
- (S) Suspended
- (I) Ineligible
- Injured
- Redshirt
