= John Hangartner =

Profile
- Position: Quarterback

Personal information
- Born: c. 1937; Glendale, California, U.S.
- Listed weight: 9 lb (4 kg)

Career information
- College: Arizona State (1972–1974)

John Hangartner (born c. 1937) is a former American football quarterback. He played college football for the Arizona State Sun Devils from 1956 to 1958. He also played defense for the Sun Devils as a defensive back. As a junior in 1957, he led all major-college players with a school record 14 passing touchdowns. He also ranked third in the country with 1,208 passing yards in 1958 and fifth with 1,203 yards in 1957. He was also selected as the most valuable player of both the 1957 and 1958 Arizona State Sun Devils football teams. In three years at Arizona State, he completed 148 of 258 passes (57.1%) for 2,712 passing yards, 26 touchdowns, 19 interceptions, and a 163.6 passer rating.
