= Ralph Hunsaker =

American football quarterback

- Hunsaker, 1956

Profile
- Position: Quarterback

Personal information
- Born: December 1936 (age 89); Mesa, Arizona, U.S.

Career information
- High school: Mesa
- College: Arizona (1955–1958)

Ralph Earl Hunsaker (born December 1936) is an American former football quarterback for the Arizona Wildcats from 1955 to 1958. As a senior in 1958, he ranked among college football's leaders with 106 completions (second), 191 attempts (second), a .555 completion percentage (fourth), 1,129 passing yards (sixth), 13 interceptions (tied for fourth), and a 100.2 passing efficiency rating (sixth).

Hunsaker was born in Mesa, Arizona, in December 1936. He grew up in Mesa and attended Mesa High School. He then attended the University of Arizona on a football scholarship. He remained at the university for both his undergraduate studies and for law school, receiving his law degree in 1962. He worked as a lawyer in Phoenix, Arizona, for over 40 years.

== College statistics ==
Passing and rushing statistics
Season	School	Games	Attempts	Completions	Yards	Interceptions	Passing touchdowns	Completion percentage	Rushing yards	Rushing touchdowns
1955	Arizona		40	22	319		2	.550		
1956	Arizona	10	148	75	823	12	4	.507	124	2
1957	Arizona	10	138	73	717	8	4	.529	-31	2
1958	Arizona	10	191	106	1129	13	5	.555	-91	1
