= 1958 North Texas State Eagles football team =

American college football season

1958 North Texas State Eagles football

MVC champion
- Conference: Missouri Valley Conference
- Record: 7–2–1 (2–1–1 MVC)
- Head coach: Odus Mitchell (13th season)
- Home stadium: Fouts Field

1958 Missouri Valley Conference football standings
	Conf.					Overall
Team	W		L		T	W		L		T
North Texas State $	2	–	1	–	1	7	–	2	–	1
Cincinnati	1	–	1	–	2	6	–	2	–	2
Tulsa	2	–	2	–	0	7	–	3	–	0
Houston	2	–	2	–	0	5	–	4	–	0
Wichita	1	–	2	–	1	4	–	5	–	1
$ – Conference champion

The 1958 North Texas State Eagles football team was an American football team that represented North Texas State College (now known as the University of North Texas) during the 1958 college football season as a member of the Missouri Valley Conference. In their 13th year under head coach Odus Mitchell, the team compiled a 7–2–1 record.

== Schedule ==
Date	Opponent	Site	Result	Attendance	Source
September 24	Texas Western*	Fouts Field; Denton, TX	W 26–8	7,000–10,000	
September 27	at Oklahoma State*	Lewis Field; Stillwater, OK	L 14–21	16,500	
October 4	New Mexico A&M*	Fouts Field; Denton, TX	W 43–12		
October 11	at Drake*	Drake Stadium; Des Moines, IA	W 42–0	3,500	
October 18	at BYU*	Cougar Stadium; Provo, UT	W 12–6	6,594	
October 25	Tulsa^{†}	Fouts Field; Denton, TX	W 8–7	14,000	
November 1	Cincinnati	Fouts Field; Denton, TX	T 8–8	5,000	
November 8	at Wichita	Veterans Field; Wichita, KS	L 13–15	7,839	
November 15	Houston	Fouts Field; Denton, TX	W 10–6	10,000	
November 22	at Louisville*	Fairgrounds Stadium; Louisville, KY	W 21–10	3,000	
*Non-conference game; ^{†}Homecoming
