= 1958 New Mexico A&M Aggies football team =

American college football season

1958 New Mexico A&M Aggies football
- Conference: Border Conference
- Record: 4–6 (1–3 Border)
- Head coach: Warren B. Woodson (1st season)
- Home stadium: Memorial Stadium

1958 Border Conference football standings
	Conf.					Overall
Team	W		L		T	W		L		T
Hardin–Simmons $	4	–	0	–	0	6	–	5	–	0
Arizona State	4	–	1	–	0	7	–	3	–	0
Arizona	2	–	1	–	0	3	–	7	–	0
New Mexico A&M	1	–	3	–	0	4	–	6	–	0
Texas Western	1	–	4	–	0	2	–	7	–	0
West Texas State	1	–	4	–	0	1	–	9	–	0
$ – Conference champion

The 1958 New Mexico A&M Aggies football team was an American football team that represented New Mexico State University in the Border Conference during the 1958 college football season. In its first year under head coach Warren B. Woodson, the team compiled a 4–6 record (1–3 against conference opponents), finished in fourth place in the conference, and was outscored by a total of 228 to 172.

Woodson was later inducted into the College Football Hall of Fame.

== Schedule ==
Date	Time	Opponent	Site	Result	Attendance	Source
September 13		Trinity (TX)*	Memorial Stadium; Las Cruces, NM	L 0–20		
September 20		New Mexico*	Memorial Stadium; Las Cruces, NM (rivalry)	L 7–16	6,500	
September 26		UNAM*	Memorial Stadium; Las Cruces, NM	W 28–14		
October 4		at North Texas State*	Fouts Field; Denton, TX	L 12–43		
October 11		at Western State (CO)*	Gunnison, CO	W 27–24		
October 25		Texas Western	Memorial Stadium; Las Cruces, NM (rivalry)	W 17–16	7,000	
November 1		at Arizona State	Sun Devil Stadium; Tempe, AZ	L 19–23	27,300	
November 8		McMurry*^{†}	Memorial Stadium; Las Cruces, NM	W 10–7	4,500	
November 22	1:00 p.m.	at West Texas State	Buffalo Stadium; Canyon, TX	L 32–39	2,500	
November 28		at Hardin–Simmons	Parramore Stadium; Abilene, TX	L 20–26		
*Non-conference game; ^{†}Homecoming; All times are in Mountain time
