= 5–3 defense =

American football defensive formation

In American football, the 5–3 defense is a defensive alignment consisting of five down linemen and three linebackers.

== Historical ==
Defense is based on two standard formations, the 6–2–3, and the 5–3–3. All else is "variations."

— Steve Owen, My Kind of Football, David McKay, 1952, p. 174

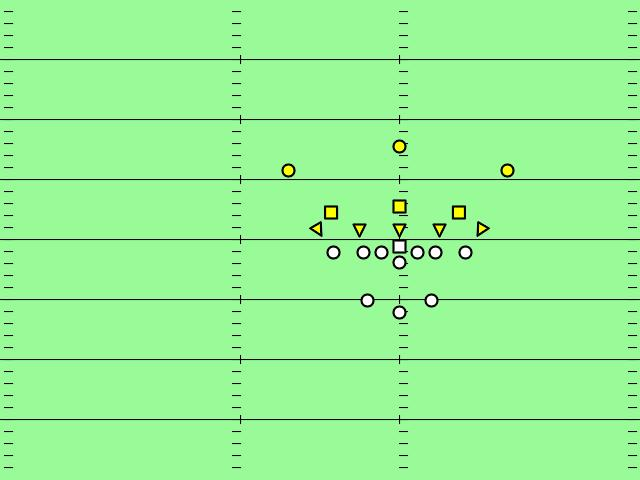
5–3–3 circa 1950. Yellow triangles are defensive linemen, yellow squares are linebackers, yellow circles are defensive backs

The 5–3 is a defense that appeared in the 1930s due to the demands of the ever–improving passing attacks of the time, as well as innovations in the T formation (in 1933, pro football's passing rules were liberalized). One origin story is that of Steve Owen, coach of the New York Giants. He says he invented it to surprise the Bears in 1933. He then goes on to say that the 5–3 was in part responsible for the division championships won by the Giants in 1933, 1934, and 1935.

By the late 1930s, the two standard defenses in college and the NFL were the 6–2 and the 5–3. The 5–3 was regarded as a pass defense, the 6–2 the run defense. The usage of the 5–3 defense accelerated as the T formation became more popular and more effective. Dana Bible, in his 1947 coaching tome, called it the best defense against the T formation. By 1950, the base defenses in the NFL were all five man line defenses, either the 5–3 or the 5–2 Eagle.

Three teams known for their use of the 5–3–3 were the Cleveland Browns, the Pittsburgh Steelers, and the San Francisco 49ers. Paul Brown attributed his loss in the 1951 NFL Championship, in part, to an error in coverage in their three-man backfield. By the later 1950s, the 5–3 had died out in the NFL, replaced by the 5–2 Eagle or the 4–3. Hardy Brown, a 5–3 middle linebacker for the 49ers, and one of the hardest hitting linebackers of his era, was unable to adapt to changing times, and was cut because he could not deal with the demands of the new 4–3 defense.

== Modern usage ==
Colleges tend to have less powerful passing games than professional football, and the use of three man backfields or an overshifted secondary is common practice. In the overshift, one of the safeties plays a monster or rover role, often moving to the strong side of the offensive formation to about linebacker depth. As a consequence, a body of defenses has emerged that have 5 man lines, 2 linebackers and a monster or rover back. This rover is a hybrid player, expected to use a linebacker technique when runs are encountered, and act like a pass defender otherwise.

According to Homer Smith, former head coach of the Army football team, the origin of the overshift, which he called the inverted rotation, is obscure. He first observed it in 1958. However, as widely spread flankers would break the run contain methods of the day (e.g. the "four spoke" contain of the 5–2 Oklahoma), the inverted secondary became popular as a way to stop the rushing attack of formations like Earl Blaik's Lonely End.

=== 5–2 Monster ===
The kinds of defenses seen of this kind are varied. The best known is the 5–2 Monster, combining the 5–2 Oklahoma with the overshifted monster secondary. This defense is often credited with stopping the option rushing attacks that began developing in the 1940s.

=== Desert Swarm and related defenses ===
A more modern variant are a series of defenses with 5 man lines, stemming from defenses Rich Ellerson was exposed to while coaching Canadian football. Adapted to 11 man American football, this defensive system first gained prominence with the Arizona teams of Dick Tomey, whose defense became known as the Desert Swarm defense. The best known practitioner of this defense may be former Patriots linebacker Tedy Bruschi, who played defensive end in Tomey's scheme.

== Bibliography ==
Amorosi, Ted, Coaching Football's Double Eagle Flex Defense, Coaches Choice, 2004.

Beech, Mark, When Saturday Mattered Most, St. Martins Press, 2012. [ebook]

Bible, Dana X. Championship Football, Prentice-Hall, 1947.

Brown, Paul and Clary, Jack, PB: The Paul Brown Story, Atheneum, 1979

Carroll, Bob, Gershman, Michael, Neft, David, and Thorn, John, Total Football II: The Official Encyclopedia of the National Football League, HarperCollins, 1999, Chapter 17.

Halas, George, Morgan, Gwen, and Veysey, Arthur, Halas by Halas, McGraw-Hill, 1979.

Jones, Gomer, and Wilkinson, Bud, Modern Defensive Football, Prentice-Hall, 1957.

Owen, Steve, My Kind of Football, David McKay, 1952.

Tittle, Y.A., and Clark, Kristine S. Nothing Comes Easy, Triumph Books, 2006, Chapter 16.

Tomey, Dick, Ellerson, Rich, Mac Duff, Larry, and Lynn Johnnie, Swarming the Offense in Defensive Football Strategies, American Football Coaches Association, 2000.

Wilkinson, Bud, Football: Defense, Sports Illustrated, 1973.

Zimmerman, Paul, The New Thinking Man's Guide to Pro Football, Simon and Schuster, 1984, Chapter 6.

Zimmerman, Paul, The Past is Prelude, September 1, 1997. Sports Illustrated, retrieved June 22, 2013.
