= Miami 4–3 defense =

Defensive formation in American football made famous by coach Jimmy Johnson

The Miami 4–3, also called the 4–lslide, is a scheme closely associated with the Jimmy Johnson-led Miami Hurricanes, and taken by Johnson to the Dallas Cowboys. Built around Jimmy Johnson's notion of "upfield pressure", it is a penetrating, swarming defense, with a "get there firstest with the mostest" mentality. The focus is to cause opponents to make mistakes, even if the defense might give up a big gain or two. Compared to older 4–3 defenses, such as Tom Landry's 4–3 inside, the defensive line assignments are simpler. Linemen don't read then react, they act then read. Linebackers fill the gaps the linemen leave behind, ignoring gaps away from the play. Coverages are simple, and the playbook small and easy to learn.

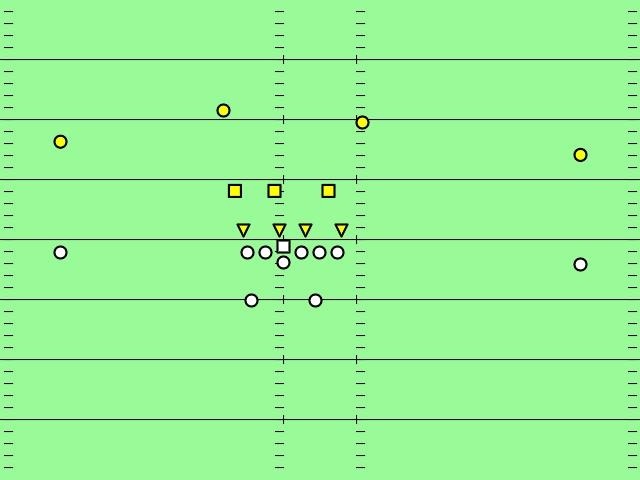
Miami 4–3, Shade front. Yellow triangles are defensive linemen, yellow squares are linebackers, yellow circles are defensive backs.

The base Miami front is an "over" front, with a nose tackle shaded weak side to the center, a defensive tackle shaded outside the strong side guard, a defensive end shaded outside the tight end, and the weakside end outside the offensive tackle. Each lineman is assigned one gap. Linebackers are stationed about 4 to 4.5 yards behind the line of scrimmage. This differs from the old Landry 4–3 defenses, in which linebackers are within 1.5 yards of the line of scrimmage.

The Miami 4–3 uses smaller, faster players than other standard defenses. Defensive ends for the Miami 4–3 are often former linebackers. Outside linebackers are often converted safeties. Players are chosen for speed and aggression more than size and power. The middle linebacker is the one true linebacker, the tackles the two true linemen in this defense.

== Influence of the new defense ==
Once it was realized how effective the scheme could be at stopping the college offenses of the day and was also found successful at the NFL level, it became very popular, and started a resurgence in the use of the 4–3. College coaches that felt overmatched by the increasing size of offensive lines often switched.

The Miami front influenced all other 4–3 defenses that followed, including the Cover 2 and the Tampa 2 schemes. By some accounts it is the most popular 4–3 played today, due to the simplicity and utility of the scheme.

== Bibliography ==
- Bramel, Jene, Guide to N.F.L. Defenses, Part 2: Evolution of 4-3 Front. September 7, 2010. New York Times. retrieved June 25, 2013.
- Brown, Chris Ode to the War Daddies. February 3, 2012. Grantland, retrieved July 22, 2013.
- Golenbock, Cowboys Have Always Been my Heroes, Warner Books, 1997.
- Johnson, Jimmy, and Hinton, Ed, Turning the Thing Around, Hyperion, 1993.
- Kirwin, Pat and Siegerman, David, Take Your Eye Off the Ball, Triumph Books, 2008, pp. 113–118.
- Lombardi, Vince, Vince Lombardi on Football, Volume 1, New York Graphic Society, 1973.
- Novak, Joe, Choosing the 4–3 over the 50 in Defensive Football Strategies, American Football Coaches Association, 2000, pp. 71–73.
- Simons, Tim, and Freeman, Mike, Coaching Football's 4–3 Defense, Second Edition, Coaches Choice, 2003.
- Vanderlinden, Ron, Football's Eagle and Stack Defenses, Human Kinetics, 2008.
