= 1959 Orange Bowl =

American college football game

- 25th Orange Bowl
- Burdine Stadium in Miami, Florida, hosted the Orange Bowl.
Syracuse Orangemen	Oklahoma Sooners
(8–1)	(9–1)
Independent	Big Seven
6	21
Head coach: Ben Schwartzwalder	Head coach: Bud Wilkinson
AP / Coaches; 9 / 10	AP / Coaches; 5 / 5
	1	2	3	4	Total
Syracuse	0	0	0	6	6
Oklahoma	14	0	7	0	21
- Date: January 1, 1959
- Season: 1958
- Stadium: Burdine Stadium
- Location: Miami, Florida
- Favorite: Oklahoma by 13
- Referee: Cliff Ogden (Big Seven; split crew: Big Seven, ECAC)
- Attendance: 75,281

United States TV coverage
- Network: CBS
- Announcers: Joe Boland & Jim McKay

The 1959 Orange Bowl featured the Syracuse Orangemen (8–1) and the Oklahoma Sooners (9–1) in the 25th annual Orange Bowl, played on Thursday, January 1, 1959, at the Miami Orange Bowl in Miami.

== Background ==
This was Oklahoma's fourth Orange Bowl in six seasons while Syracuse was making their second Orange Bowl appearance in six seasons. Oklahoma had won its thirteenth straight Big Seven title and Syracuse was an independent. The first of the day's four major bowl games, kickoff was at 1 p.m. EST on CBS television, and Oklahoma was a thirteen-point favorite.

== Game summary ==
Oklahoma scored early with a Prentice Gautt rushing touchdown three minutes into the game. With the quarter running down, Syracuse fumbled the ball back to the Sooners after driving to the Sooners red zone. With 2:56 left in the quarter, Brewster Hobby caught a lateral and then passed to Ross Coyle, who ran 79 yards for the touchdown and a 14–0 lead. After a scoreless second quarter, Hobby sealed the game when he returned a Syracuse punt 40 yards for a touchdown to make it 21–0 after three quarters.

Mark Weber gave the Orangemen their only points on his touchdown run after a 69-yard drive, but the two-point conversion failed on an incomplete pass, and that was the end of the scoring. Despite Syracuse's run attack, two fumbles by the backs and two passes that were intercepted doomed the Orange as Oklahoma won their fourth Orange Bowl in six seasons.

== Aftermath ==
In the following season, Syracuse went undefeated and won the national title.

== Statistics ==
Statistics	Oklahoma	Syracuse
First downs	12	18
Yards rushing	152	239
Yards passing	93	72
Total yards	245	311
Punts-Average	8–37.0	8–31.2
Fumbles-Lost	2–1	2–2
Interceptions	0	2
Penalties-Yards	3–35	4–20
