= 7–1–2–1 defense =

American football defensive formation

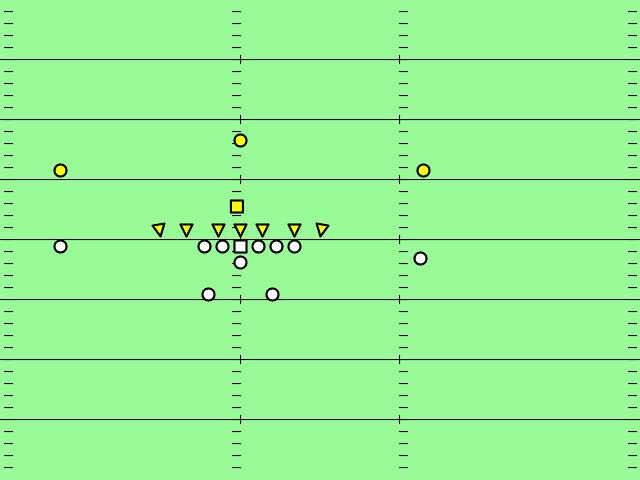
7-diamond, stemming from a wide tackle 6 by replacing one linebacker with a nose guard. This variation was seen from the 1940s to the 1960s. This defense is very similar to the 46 defense popularized by Buddy Ryan.

The 7–1–2–1, or seven-diamond defense, used seven "down linemen", or players on the line of scrimmage at the time of the snap, one linebacker, two safeties relatively close to the line and one safety further downfield. The formation was created by Minnesota Golden Gophers coach Henry L. Williams in 1903, reputedly to stop Michigan back Willie Heston. By some accounts in the mid-1930s, the 7–1–2–1 was considered "almost obsolete" due to its weakness against the forward pass, whereas the 7–2–2 defense was still considered viable. However, Bill Arnsparger notes the use of the seven-diamond from the 1940s into the 1960s, as a defensive adjustment to the common wide tackle 6 defenses of the time. Furthermore, the form of the 7 diamond as derived from a wide tackle 6, with a more compact line spacing than the 1930s era 7 man lines, shows a marked similarity to the 46 defense of Buddy Ryan.

== Background ==
The 1906 football rule reforms mandated that offenses use at least seven down linemen. These players usually stood shoulder-to-shoulder before the snap, a posture defenses tended to match. The defenses of the time are considered unsophisticated by today's standards. The interior defensive linemen were expected to hold their ground against their assigned blockers, while the responsibility of disrupting the offense rested primarily with the tackles and ends, especially those lined up on the "strong" side of the opposing line.

Over time, however, as new offensive formations, such as the single wing, were introduced, and increased lateral running and passing threats, the seven man front changed in character. Box and letter drawings of the seven man front, by coaches such as Bernie Bierman and Steve Owen show a broadly spread front, with the center and two guards versus the interior five offensive linemen, defensive tackles 2–5 yards from the guards, and ends 2–5 yards outside the defensive tackles, and well outside the offensive ends.

Improvements in offensive blocking schemes eventually made the seven-man line defenses vulnerable, but it remained a common formation, particularly against opponents with an unreliable passing attack, even into the 1950s. The abolition of the one-platoon system at all levels of the game by the 1960s effectively ended use of 7-man fronts except in goal-line situations. Free substitution thus allowed bulkier offensive linemen to be taken out and replaced by more agile linebackers, giving defenses increased flexibility.

The 3-4 defense can be viewed as a modern variant of the 7-man defensive front (specifically the 7–2–2), with the cornerbacks (ends), outside linebackers (tackles), "defensive ends" (guards) and the nose tackle (center) all lined up roughly on the line of scrimmage. The key difference is in the spacing of the line (the linebackers and defensive ends are spread wider than in the original 7-man front) and the fact that the outside linebackers and cornerbacks usually stand upright instead of crouching into a three-point stance.
