= 6–2 defense =

American football defensive formation

In American football, the 6–2 defense is a defensive alignment consisting of six down linemen and two linebackers.

== Historical ==
This defense is generally considered to be the best balanced arrangement against a well balanced attack, Dana X. Bible, Championship Football, 1947, p. 154

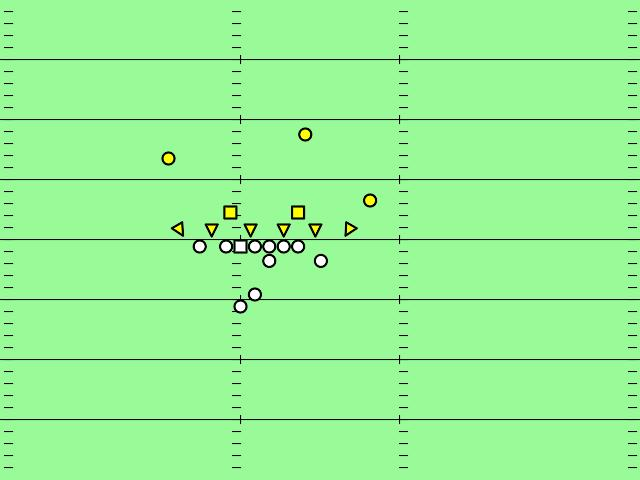
Single wing offense versus a 6–2. This shows a refinement of the 8 man front, where the cornerback clamps tight on the wingback, presenting a de facto 9 man line to the single wing offense. Yellow triangles are linemen, yellow squares are linebackers, yellow circles are defensive backs.

The 6–2 is a defense that became popular in the 1930s due to the demands of the improving passing attacks of the time. In the early 1930s, pro football's passing rules were liberalized. By the late 1930s, the two standard defenses in college and the NFL were the 6–2 and the 5–3. The 5–3 was regarded as a pass defense, and the 6–2, for most teams, was the base defense.

By the 1940s, one could see this defense overshifted or undershifted. Pass defenses were man-to-man, zone, or a combination, the three man secondary lending itself to a Cover 3. Players would pull out of the line, to fall into short zones, as zone blitz teams do today, rushing four and having four players in short zones. Secondary rotations were common as an adjustment to a "man in motion" from the T.

The usage of the 6–2 defense waned as the T formation became more popular and more effective. By 1950, the base defenses in the NFL were all five man line defenses, either the 5–3 or the 5–2 Eagle. 8 man front defenses were still popular in the college ranks, and the six man line evolved. The defensive lines grew tighter, to gain numerical advantages over the five interior linemen. Gap control concepts were introduced, and to defend against the original option offense, the Split-T, rotating backfields were introduced.

== Modern usage ==
The wide tackle six was and remains today a favorite of many. Bill Arnsparger, Arnsparger's Coaching Defensive Football, 1999, p. 56

=== Types of 6–2 defenses ===
Steve Belichick differentiates between three fundamental forms of the 6–2, based on the position of the linebackers. If the linebackers are in the interior of the formation, with three defensive linemen to either side of them, then the formation is called the Split 6. If two guards are found between the two linebackers, then the formation is called the Wide 6 or the Wide Tackle 6. A formation where the linebackers are over the ends, in a fashion akin to the 5–2 Eagle, then the formation is referred to as the Tight 6.

Stemming from the Wide Tackle 6 front is the Stacked 6–2. In this formation, the linebackers line up behind the guards instead.

=== Play of the ends in the six-man front ===
An important function of ends in the original 6–2 or 5–3 defense were as penetrating linemen. Ends were often asked to crash (rush) at 30- to 45- degree angles from the vertical. Even into the early 1940s, as Aldo Forte noted, the crashing ends of the 6–2 could present considerable problems for an opponent. Only occasionally were they asked to fall back into pass defense, take on the role of a "wide" linebacker, or cover an offensive end man-for-man.

The ends and linebackers must have the strength and ability to play the run and the agility to be involved in pass defense., Bill Arnsparger,Arnsparger's Coaching Defensive Football, 1999, p. 56

By the 1950s, however, new contain concepts, such as the "five spoke" unit emerged. In a "five spoke" contain strategy, ends, along with the three man defensive backfield, become part of the contain unit. This means that the ends acquire pass coverage responsibilities, and may have to step off the line and away from the defensive tackles to defend against certain pass patterns. So, instead of being pure run defenders and pass rushers, as 4–3 ends are, 6-man defensive ends with contain responsibilities function in ways much like outside linebackers in other defenses.

== Bibliography ==
Arnsparger, Bill, Arnsparger's Coaching Defensive Football, St. Lucie Press, 1999.

Beech, Mark, When Saturday Mattered Most, St. Martins Press, 2012. [ebook]

Belichick, Steve, Football Scouting Methods, Martino Publishing, 2010. original copyright 1962, by Ronald Press.

Bible, Dana X. Championship Football, Prentice-Hall, 1947.

Brown, Paul and Clary, Jack, PB: The Paul Brown Story, Atheneum, 1979

Carroll, Bob, Gershman, Michael, Neft, David, and Thorn, John, Total Football II: The Official Encyclopedia of the National Football League, HarperCollins, 1999, Chapter 17.

Daly, Dan, National Forgotten League, University of Nebraska Press, 2012. [ebook]

Halas, George, Morgan, Gwen, and Veysey, Arthur, Halas by Halas, McGraw-Hill, 1979.

Jones, Gomer, and Wilkinson, Bud, Modern Defensive Football, Prentice-Hall, 1957.

Owen, Steve, My Kind of Football, David McKay, 1952.

Smith, Homer, Football Coach's Complete Offensive Playbook, Parker Publishing, 1987, Chapter 1.

Zimmerman, Paul, The New Thinking Man's Guide to Pro Football, Simon and Schuster, 1984, Chapter 6.

Zimmerman, Paul, The Past is Prelude, September 1, 1997. Sports Illustrated, retrieved June 22, 2013.
