= 1958 LSU Tigers football team =

American college football season

1958 LSU Tigers football
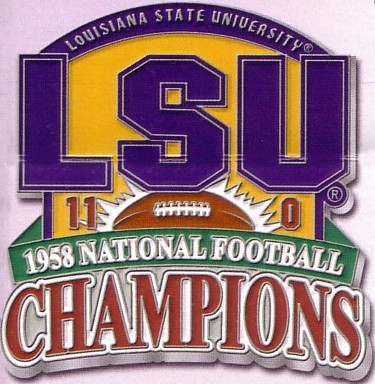

Consensus national champion SEC champion Sugar Bowl champion

Sugar Bowl, W 7–0 vs. Clemson
- Conference: Southeastern Conference

Ranking
- Coaches: No. 1
- AP: No. 1
- Record: 11–0 (6–0 SEC)
- Head coach: Paul Dietzel (4th season)
- Offensive scheme: Wing T
- Home stadium: Tiger Stadium

1958 Southeastern Conference football standings
	Conf.					Overall
Team	W		L		T	W		L		T
No. 1 LSU $	6	–	0	–	0	11	–	0	–	0
No. 4 Auburn	6	–	0	–	1	9	–	0	–	1
No. 11 Ole Miss	4	–	2	–	0	9	–	2	–	0
Vanderbilt	2	–	1	–	3	5	–	2	–	3
Tennessee	4	–	3	–	0	4	–	6	–	0
Alabama	3	–	4	–	1	5	–	4	–	1
Kentucky	3	–	4	–	1	5	–	4	–	1
No. 14 Florida	2	–	3	–	1	6	–	4	–	1
Georgia Tech	2	–	3	–	1	5	–	4	–	1
Georgia	2	–	4	–	0	4	–	6	–	0
Tulane	1	–	5	–	0	3	–	7	–	0
Mississippi State	1	–	6	–	0	3	–	6	–	0
$ – Conference champion; Ole Miss's game against Houston counted in the conference standings.; Rankings from AP Poll

The 1958 LSU Tigers football team represented Louisiana State University (LSU) in American football during the 1958 college football season. After finishing the season with a 10–0 record the team was named consensus national champion by the Associated Press (AP) and the Coaches Poll (UPI). LSU was also selected National Champions by a total of 37 selectors.

This was LSU's second national championship recognized by the NCAA and the college football community at large, the first coming when the Tigers were retro-picked as national champions in 1908 by the National Championship Foundation. However, it is the first national championship claimed by the school. It was also LSU's first undefeated and untied season since 1908, and was the last undefeated season for the school until 2019. This was LSU’s last consensus national championship until 2007.

The Tigers were coached by Paul Dietzel in his fourth season and competed in the Southeastern Conference (SEC), in which the team earned its third SEC championship and sixth conference championship overall.

The Tigers were led by a backfield of Louisiana locals Billy Cannon, Warren Rabb, and Johnny Robinson, all of whom received first-team All-SEC honors after the season. The team is perhaps most remembered for coach Paul Dietzel's unique "three-platoon system", of which the "Chinese Bandits" were a part.

== Before the season ==
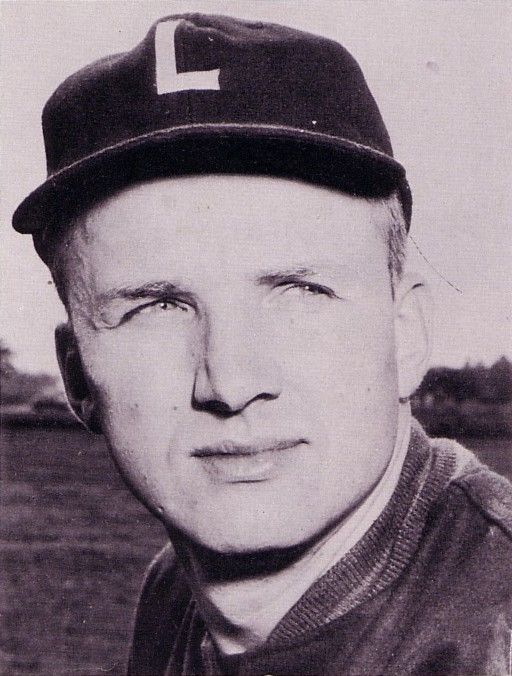
Coach Dietzel

Prior to the season, LSU head coach Paul Dietzel experimented with different methods of keeping players rested. Substitution rules at the time allowed players to re-enter a game only twice per quarter. Dietzel implemented his "three-platoon system", which split the team into the "White Team", the "Go Team", and the "Chinese Bandits." Each platoon was a unit consisting of eleven players. The White Team was the starting unit. It consisted of the team's most talented players who excelled on both offense and defense. The Go Team was the second string unit that played primarily on offense. The Chinese Bandits were the team's second string defense, and was made up of mainly underclassmen. Dietzel's plan was to swap players out in a platoon-like fashion in order to keep them rested throughout the game, since most starters played on both offense and defense during this era. Instead of resting individual players, he replaced all eleven players on the field. This system was part of what Dietzel referred to as "efficient football;" to attempt get the most production out of every player on the team.

Dietzel recruited a talented freshman class for the 1956 season, and had high expectations now that they were upperclassmen. However, in the preseason LSU was picked to finish ninth out of twelve teams in the Southeastern Conference. While they had talent on offense, the Tigers were young and inexperienced on defense. To utilize the team's talented backfield, which consisted of halfbacks Billy Cannon and Johnny Robinson, Dietzel adopted a wing T offensive formation. This formation favored the running game, and it was the first major change in LSU's offense since 1944. Dietzel then named the young defense the "Chinese Bandits", after characters from a Terry and the Pirates comic strip, hoping an identity would instill pride and confidence in what would ordinarily have been substitute players.

== Schedule ==
Date	Opponent	Rank	Site	TV	Result	Attendance	Source
September 20	at Rice*		Rice Stadium; Houston, TX		W 26–6	45,000	
September 27	at Alabama	No. 15	Ladd Stadium; Mobile, AL (rivalry)		W 13–3	34,000	
October 4	Hardin–Simmons*	No. 13	Tiger Stadium; Baton Rouge, LA		W 20–6	45,000	
October 10	at Miami (FL)*	No. 11	Burdine Stadium; Miami, FL		W 41–0	40,614	
October 18	Kentucky	No. 9	Tiger Stadium; Baton Rouge, LA		W 32–7	65,000	
October 25	Florida^{†}	No. 3	Tiger Stadium; Baton Rouge, LA (rivalry)		W 10–7	62,000	
November 1	No. 6 Ole Miss	No. 1	Tiger Stadium; Baton Rouge, LA (rivalry)		W 14–0	68,000	
November 8	Duke*	No. 1	Tiger Stadium; Baton Rouge, LA		W 50–18	63,000	
November 15	at Mississippi State	No. 1	Mississippi Veterans Memorial Stadium; Jackson, MS (rivalry)		W 7–6	26,000	
November 22	at Tulane	No. 1	Tulane Stadium; New Orleans, LA (Battle for the Rag)		W 62–0	83,221	
January 1, 1959	vs. No. 12 Clemson*	No. 1	Tulane Stadium; New Orleans, LA (Sugar Bowl)	NBC	W 7–0	80,331	
*Non-conference game; ^{†}Homecoming; Rankings from AP Poll released prior to the game

== Game summaries ==
=== At Rice ===
Team	1	2	3	4	Total
• LSU	7	6	6	7	26
Rice	0	0	0	6	6

- Date: September 20
- Location: Rice Stadium
  Houston, Texas
- Game attendance: 45,000

LSU opened the season on September 20 with a 26–6 upset win over the defending SWC champion Rice Owls in Rice Stadium. The Tigers were projected as six point underdogs against the Owls, whose coach Jess Neely was entering his eighteenth season with the team. Constant rain throughout the day before and during the game had muddied the field and made handling the ball difficult. This proved to be a problem for the Owls, as they fumbled the ball six times, losing two of them. LSU opened the game with a ten play, 57-yard drive capped by a quarterback scramble by Warren Rabb into the end zone. In the second quarter, LSU's Don Purvis returned a punt 27 yards into Rice territory, and the Tigers again drove down the field and scored on a two-yard run by fullback J.W. Brodnax. Tommy Davis missed the extra point, and LSU went into halftime with a 13–0 lead. Rice was unable to convert a first down until its last possession of the first half.

LSU received the ball to start the third quarter. On the first drive, Cannon ran around the right side for 25 yards. The drive stalled at the Rice 40-yard line, however, and Cannon punted down to the one-inch line. The Owls were forced to punt soon after, and the ball landed at their own 35-yard line, where Cannon picked it up and returned it 30 yards to the Rice five-yard line. Johnny Robinson scored on the next play with a run to the left side. Later in the third, Rice's Charles Knight intercepted a pass on the LSU 37-yard line. The Owls drove down the field and scored on the first play of the fourth quarter. Later in the fourth, Mel Branch of the Chinese Bandits intercepted a pass at the Rice 30-yard line. Nine plays later, Davis scored the final touchdown of the game and kicked the extra point.

LSU had 266 yards of total offense in the game and Rice compiled 144. Passing contributed to only 48 yards between both teams as the rainy conditions forced them to stick to the running game. Cannon gained 53 yards on nine carries as the game's leading rusher. The performance by LSU impressed the pollsters, who ranked the team fifteenth after being unranked prior to the game. Coach Dietzel said in the locker room after the game:

"It was gratifying to score a victory over a team coached by a man that I respect as much as coach Neely. We made mistakes Saturday night [but] we made up for them in hustle and desire. I guess you can sum up what I feel about these boys in four words...I'm proud of them. I do believe that the condition of the playing field and adverse weather conditions prevented either team from finding out their true strength or weaknesses."

=== At Alabama ===
Alabama–LSU

Team	1	2	3	4	Total
• #15 LSU	0	0	7	6	13
Alabama	0	3	0	0	3

- Date: September 27
- Location: Ladd Stadium
  Mobile, Alabama
- Game attendance: 34,000

In the second week of play, LSU traveled to Ladd Stadium in Mobile, Alabama and defeated the Alabama Crimson Tide, 13–3 in coach Bear Bryant's first game with the team. Paul Dietzel had previously served as an assistant coach for Bryant during his tenure at Kentucky. Neither teams' defense allowed a score in the first quarter. In the second quarter, Cannon fumbled at Alabama's 45-yard line, and Duff Morrison picked it up for the Tide and returned it to the LSU 5-yard line. Here, the Chinese Bandits had the first of their famous goal-line stands, and held Alabama to a field goal. Alabama's defensive line and linebackers made it difficult for LSU to run the ball in the first half, and they also put pressure on Rabb during passing plays. The Crimson Tide went into halftime with a 3–0 lead. Midway through the half, a section of bleachers in the north end zone collapsed and resulted in 60 spectators being injured. The collapse caused a stoppage of play while emergency responders worked to assist those injured by the collapse.

LSU took a 7–3 lead in the third quarter when Rabb threw a nine-yard touchdown pass to Robinson that capped a 67-yard drive. Cannon then scored on a 12-yard touchdown run to his right in the fourth quarter. Down by ten and the game winding down, Alabama turned to its passing game but were unable to find success. LSU's pass rush did not give Alabama quarterback Bobby Smith any time to throw the ball. The Tide completed three passes in the game for a net of zero yards. In total, LSU compiled 253 yards of offense in the game to Alabama's 100. Billy Cannon was the game's leading rusher with 86 yards and a touchdown on twelve carries. The victory over Bryant proved to be a rare one for LSU, as the Tigers won only three more games against Alabama in the next 24 seasons.

=== Hardin Simmons ===
Team	1	2	3	4	Total
Hardin Simmons	0	6	0	0	6
• #13 LSU	13	7	0	0	20

- Date: October 4
- Location: Tiger Stadium
  Baton Rouge, Louisiana
- Game attendance: 45,000

In LSU's first home game of the season the team defeated coach Sammy Baugh's Cowboys of Hardin–Simmons, 20–6. It was also the first time the two football teams played each other, and remains the only time. Warren Rabb scored a touchdown on the Tigers' first possession with a roll-out from three yards out. The Cowboys lost a fumble at midfield on their first possession, which LSU took advantage of five plays later with a four-yard touchdown run by Durel Matherne. Hardin Simmons scored its only points of the game on a drive that started on its own 7-yard line in the first quarter, and ended with a touchdown early in the second quarter. LSU responded with an eleven-yard rushing touchdown by Cannon later in the quarter. It was the last score of the game, as neither team scored in the second half.

The Cowboys had a chance to score in the third quarter with the ball on LSU's one-yard line on first down. However, the Tigers came up with another goal-line stand, this time by the White Team with a fumble recovery. In the fourth quarter, Hardin–Simmons had another chance as it drove down to the LSU 14-yard line, but turned the ball over on downs after an incomplete pass on fourth down. The game featured much more passing than LSU had seen in the previous two games. Hardin–Simmons, whose head coach Baugh was a former star quarterback in the National Football League, was a passing-minded team. While LSU rushed for 204 yards, Hardin–Simmons passed for 201 yards on 19 completions. Warren Rabb, who was playing despite the death of his father that morning, completed six passes for 88 yards. For the third game in a row, Cannon was the leading rusher with 83 yards and a touchdown on eleven carries.

=== At Miami (FL) ===
Team	1	2	3	4	Total
• #11 LSU	6	7	8	20	41
Miami (FL)	0	0	0	0	0

- Date: October 10
- Location: Orange Bowl
  Miami
- Game attendance: 40,614

The Tigers had their first shutout of the season in week four, when they traveled to the Orange Bowl and defeated the Miami Hurricanes, 41–0. On its first possession LSU drove down to the Miami 49-yard line, where a pass from Rabb was intercepted and ran back to the LSU 42-yard line. The Hurricanes went three-and-out on their offensive possession and attempted a field goal, but the kick was short. After punts by both teams, the Tigers scored their first touchdown of the game on a 51-yard run by Don Purvis. Miami was forced to punt on the first play of the second quarter and it was downed at the LSU 5-yard line. LSU was also forced to punt, but the Hurricanes fumbled on the return and the Tigers recovered it at Miami's 27-yard line. After a first down run by Cannon, Rabb threw a touchdown pass to Billy Hendrix to make the score 13–0 at halftime.

Billy Cannon took the kickoff to open the second half and returned it from the goal-line to midfield. LSU drove down the field and Brodnax scored on a three-yard run up the middle. Miami quarterback Fran Curci then led the Hurricanes on a drive down to the LSU 20, but the ball was turned over on downs. Neither team scored for the rest of the quarter. LSU opened the fourth quarter with two incomplete passes, and Cannon got off a 51-yard punt down to Miami's 15-yard line. The Hurricanes were also forced to punt, and a fair catch interference penalty on Miami gave LSU the ball at the 16. From there, Rabb passed to Brodnax down to the one-yard line, where Cannon ran it in for a touchdown on the next play. Miami received the kickoff and returned it to its own 35-yard line, but a holding penalty moved the ball back to the twelve. The Hurricanes went three-and-out and punted to midfield, where Purvis received it and ran it back to Miami's 22-yard line. Four plays later, Matherne passed to Don Norwood for a four-yard touchdown. LSU's Henry Lee Roberts intercepted a pass from Curci at midfield and the Tigers drove down the field once more for their last touchdown of the game.

Thirty of the 32 players that traveled for LSU to Miami saw playing time in the game. Dietzel pulled most starters after the first score of the fourth quarter. Fran Curci gave LSU the most trouble; he passed for 62 yards and rushed for 62 more, which led his team in both categories. Tommy Davis was LSU's leading rusher with 62 yards of his own. Miami gained fourteen first downs to LSU's eleven, but three interceptions ended drives early for the Hurricanes. It was another run-dominated game for LSU as both teams had over 200 rushing yards. The win moved LSU into the top ten in the Coaches' Poll, to number nine.

=== Kentucky ===
Team	1	2	3	4	Total
Kentucky	7	0	0	0	7
• #9 LSU	7	6	13	6	32

- Date: October 18
- Location: Tiger Stadium
  Baton Rouge, Louisiana
- Game attendance: 65,000

Before a Tiger Stadium record 65,000 fans, LSU defeated the Kentucky Wildcats, 32–7. It was the first time the stadium sold out since the addition of over 20,000 seats behind the south end zone in 1954. Police officers were called in to control the crowds at ticket booths. Most of the fans were for LSU, as the 4–0 start to the season and blowout win over Miami had generated high interest in the team; it was predicted Kentucky brought only 300 fans. SEC commissioner Bernie Moore, former head coach of LSU, also attended the game. When it was over he was asked which players he would pick from the Tigers if he had to coach again. "I'd just take the first 33 men they offered me", he said. "This is a good team."

LSU scored first early in the first quarter on a two-yard run by Brodnax, which was followed by a Kentucky touchdown late in the same quarter. Dietzel sent in the Chinese Bandits to start the second quarter. The Bandits wore down the Wildcats offense and did not allow a score for the rest of the half. On offense, Billy Hendrix scored on a 19-yard pass from Rabb to give LSU a 13–0 halftime lead. LSU came out in the second half determined to put the game away. Cannon ran for a 19-yard touchdown and kicked the extra point to start the third quarter, followed by a five-yard touchdown pass from Matherne to Norwood. The only score in the fourth quarter was Cannon's second touchdown on a two-yard run up the middle. LSU dominated the game statistically. The Tigers converted 18 first downs and had 364 offensive yards, compared to the Wildcats' eight and 136. Kentucky was focused on stopping the LSU passing game, which had picked up steam over the last few games. Because of this, led by Cannon, the Tigers had a big night in the running game. The team gained 243 yards on the ground, with Cannon rushing for 108 of those on twelve carries. The win moved LSU up to third in the Coaches' Poll and Associated Press Poll.

=== Florida ===
Florida–LSU

Team	1	2	3	4	Total
Florida	0	0	0	7	7
• #3 LSU	0	7	0	3	10

- Date: October 25
- Location: Tiger Stadium
  Baton Rouge, Louisiana
- Game attendance: 62,000

For LSU's homecoming, the Tigers snapped a three-game losing streak to the Florida Gators with a 10–7 defensive struggle that came down to the last three minutes of play. The game featured one of the strongest rushing teams in the nation against one of the league's best run defenses. The Tigers, led by halfbacks Cannon and Robinson, averaged 220 yards rushing per game. The Gators, led by defensive back Don Fleming and tackle Vel Heckman, had held their previous opponents to an average of 65 yards rushing per game. LSU was favored by two touchdowns.

The Gators received the opening kickoff and ran it back to their own 25-yard line. After gaining four yards on three plays, Florida lined up to punt, but it was a fake and punter Bobby Joe Green ran 30 yards down to the LSU 41-yard line. The Gators went no further than that on three more plays and this time they did punt, pinning LSU at its seven-yard line. From there LSU went three-and-out and Cannon punted down to near midfield. After making it into the LSU red zone, a missed field goal by the Gators gave the ball to LSU at its own 20. Again LSU picked up no yards on three plays and punted. At this point Dietzel sent in the Chinese Bandits, who forced a fumble on their first play on the field and recovered it at the LSU 45. Rabb then led the Tigers down to Florida's 6-yard line as the quarter ended. On the first play of the second quarter Florida was penalized for being offside, giving LSU a first down on the one. The Gators held at the goal-line for three straight runs up the middle, but on fourth down Cannon dove into the endzone for the first score of the game.

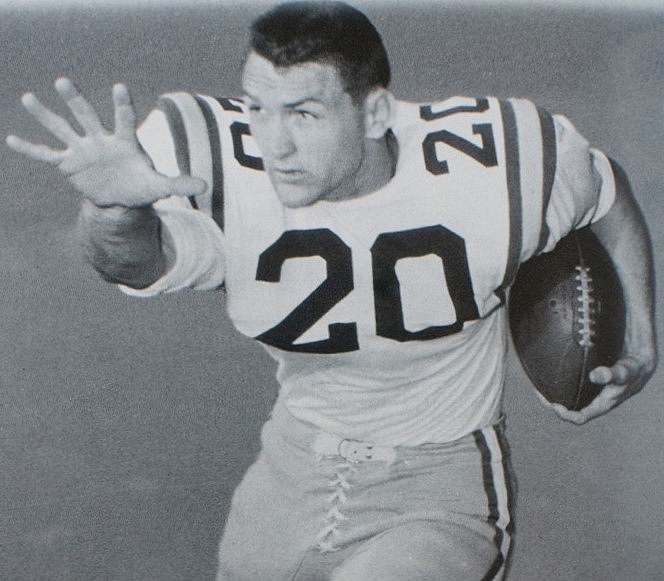
Billy Cannon

The Tigers received the second half kickoff and fumbled on their first drive, and it was recovered by Florida at their 30-yard line. After the Gators made two first downs, Brodnax intercepted a pass and returned it to LSU's 46. Rabb then led the Tigers to Florida's 41-yard line, but LSU was forced to punt after a sack by Heckman for a 15-yard loss. (Note: Sacks were not referred to as "sacks" at the time, nor were they counted in statistics. Rather, it would be said that a quarterback was "tackled for a loss" or "dumped.") After another exchange of punts, the Tigers had the ball at their own 26-yard line, and after going three-and-out, Davis went in to punt. The snap from center was low and Davis could not get the punt off. He was tackled at the 28 where Florida took the ball on downs. The Gators then completed a pass to the LSU 13-yard line for a first down. Jimmy Dunn's next pass was intercepted in the end zone by Daryll Jenkins, who ran the ball out to the ten. An illegal procedure penalty pushed LSU back to the 5-yard line. A poor punt by Cannon gave Florida the ball at the LSU 25. From there quarterback Don Deal was sacked by Max Fugler for a loss of nine to end the quarter.

Florida started the fourth quarter with a new quarterback, Mickey Ellenburg, who then led the Gators into the end zone with a 14-yard pass to Perry McGriff, tying the game at 7–7. LSU received the kickoff and were forced to punt shortly after. Florida again began a drive down the field but were intercepted by Cannon at the LSU 18-yard line, who then lateraled to Hendrix, who ran it down to LSU's 40. Rabb completed a pass to Brodnax and Cannon rushed four times for twenty yards to get LSU within eight yards of the end zone. After two incomplete passes by Rabb, Cannon tried a run up the middle, but was stopped by Heckman for a one-yard gain to bring up fourth down. Dietzel then allowed the play clock to run down and took a five-yard delay of game penalty to give Tommy Davis a better angle for a field goal attempt. From the 19-yard line, Davis stepped back and kicked it through the uprights to give LSU a 10–7 lead with 2:59 left in the game. Florida was unable to score on its final possession.

Dietzel expected a tight game, and even told Davis to "warm up that toe" during pregame warm ups. It was LSU's first field goal of the season. The Tigers were held to a season-low 89 yards rushing and were out-gained 238–181 in total yards. Cannon had 81 of those rushing yards, and Dietzel had high praise for him after the game: "If there's a better college football player in the United States than Billy Cannon, I'd like to see him." The win brought the Tigers to first place in the AP and Coaches' polls.

=== Ole Miss ===
rivalry

Team	1	2	3	4	Total
#6 Ole Miss	0	0	0	0	0
• #1 LSU	0	7	0	7	14

- Date: November 1
- Location: Tiger Stadium
  Baton Rouge, Louisiana
- Game attendance: 68,000

Top-ranked LSU defeated sixth-ranked, rival Ole Miss, 14–0 in a game dominated by defense and penalties. 68,000 fans packed Tiger Stadium to watch the Tigers win their first game against the Rebels since 1950. Ole Miss was LSU's most bitter rival at the time, and fans who heard and read about the Chinese Bandits and Billy Cannon wanted to see them first-hand. "It's not a rivalry because somebody says it is", said Cannon, "or because you've been playing against a team for a long time. It's a rivalry when two good teams meet and either one could walk out the winner. This was a rivalry." Banners were strung around the LSU campus with the words "Go to Hell, Ole Miss." Later, a plane dropped leaflets on campus that read "Go to Hell, LSU." Some thought Dietzel was responsible, hoping to fire up his team for the game, but he denied responsibility.

Neither team made it into their opponent's territory nor made a first down until late in the first quarter, when Davis fumbled the snap on a punt and Ole Miss recovered at the LSU 40-yard line. The Rebels, led by fullback Charlie Flowers, drove to the 12 as the quarter ended. To begin the second quarter Ole Miss made it down to the 2-yard line. Quarterback Bobby Franklin then kept it on a quarterback sneak and was stopped by Fugler at the one-foot line. LSU was offside on the play, but Rebels captain Kent Lovelace declined the penalty, choosing to have the ball at the one-foot line with three downs rather than the one-yard line with four. "I didn't think any team in the country could keep us from scoring from the one-foot line in three downs", Lovelace later explained. On the next run, Fugler again stopped the Rebels short of the goal-line, and Rabb made the next tackle on third down. On fourth down, Cannon and Fugler broke through the line to stop Lovelace three yards short of the end zone, where the Tigers took over on downs. The teams exchanged punts three times before a twenty-yard run by Purvis put LSU at the Ole Miss 25, where Davis attempted a field goal that fell short. The Tigers then recovered a fumble on the Rebels' 21-yard line, and from there drove into the end zone with a scramble by Rabb. The half ended with LSU leading 7–0.

The Rebels received the second half kickoff and Flowers and Franklin led a drive down the field. They made it to the LSU 32-yard line after an unsportsmanlike conduct penalty by the Tigers, where the Rebels attempted a field goal. It was blocked by Merle Schexnaildre and Fugler and LSU took over on downs. A personal foul penalty erased a 15-yard run by Cannon, which was followed by an Ole Miss sack for a loss of twelve. The Tigers punted but the Rebels were penalized for roughing the kicker, giving the ball back to LSU. To start the fourth quarter, LSU drove down to the 2-yard line, but the Rebels held there and took over on downs. They punted soon after and LSU drove to the Ole Miss 33, where Davis missed his second field goal, followed by another punt by the Rebels. At its own 30-yard line, LSU gained 19 yards on a run by Purvis, and a personal foul on the Rebels put the ball on the Ole Miss 37. After losing seven yards the Tigers punted and it was blocked, but recovered by LSU at the 33. (Note: Any punt that is blocked beyond the line of scrimmage by the defense is considered live and may be recovered by either team. If recovered by the kicking team, it is a first down for the kicking team at the spot of recovery.) After a run of 13 yards and a personal foul on Ole Miss, Matherne scrambled five yards into the end zone to give the Tigers their second touchdown and the final score. "It was the most wonderful victory I've ever been associated with", Dietzel told his players after the game. "I'm proud of you. Now go ahead and act like the number one team in the nation should act."

=== Duke ===
Team	1	2	3	4	Total
Duke	6	0	6	6	18
• #1 LSU	6	22	8	14	50

- Date: November 8
- Location: Tiger Stadium
  Baton Rouge, Louisiana
- Game attendance: 63,000

LSU's defense gave up 18 points—the most they had allowed all season—but the offense made up for it by scoring fifty against Duke in what The Times-Picayune headline at the time described as a "TD orgy." The offensive statistics for the game were deceiving; Duke picked up 24 first downs and 353 yards, to LSU's 11 first downs and 285 yards. However, the Blue Devils lost five fumbles and the Tigers were able to take advantage of them with touchdowns.

Duke scored first with a 63-yard drive capped by a touchdown catch by Wray Carlton, on what was the first touchdown scored against the Chinese Bandits all season. LSU tied the score on their next drive with a 63-yard touchdown pass from Rabb to Cannon that brought the crowd to their feet. In the second quarter, Duke attempted a quick kick that was blocked by Emile Fournet and recovered by Gaynell Kinchen at the Blue Devils' one-yard line. Schexnaildre ran it in on the next play to give the Tigers the lead. After a poor punt by Duke, LSU drove down and scored on another one-yard run, this time by Brodnax. Duke fumbled on its next drive and it was recovered on its 39-yard line by LSU. The Tigers scored their third touchdown of the quarter with a pass from Rabb to Hendrix to give LSU a 28–6 halftime lead.

The deficit proved too much for Duke to overcome, as LSU scored another touchdown on a 45-yard run by Robinson less than four minutes into the second half. The Blue Devils kept fighting, however, and scored touchdowns in each of the final two quarters. The first of these touchdowns came in the third quarter with a touchdown pass by Bob Brodhead, who later served as athletic director for LSU in the 1980s. In the fourth quarter the Tigers scored on long touchdown runs from Cannon and Matherne to put the game out of reach.

=== At Mississippi State ===
LSU–Mississippi St.

Team	1	2	3	4	Total
• #1 LSU	0	0	7	0	7
#20 Miss. St.	0	6	0	0	6

- Date: November 15
- Location:
  Mississippi Veterans Memorial Stadium
  Jackson, Mississippi
- Game attendance: 26,000

LSU's closest game of the season was a 7–6 victory over the Mississippi State Maroons, (Note: Mississippi State's official moniker for sports teams was changed to the Bulldogs in 1961.) in which a missed extra point was the difference in the score. Persistent rain before the game made the field wet and muddy, which contributed to six lost fumbles between the teams. It was fumbles that led to each team's scoring opportunities. Mississippi State's touchdown came at the start of the second quarter, after Donnie Daye fumbled and the Maroons recovered it on LSU's 23-yard line. Quarterback Billy Stacy ran it in from eleven yards out, but the extra point was missed. The Tigers scored their touchdown early in the third quarter after Brodnax recovered a fumble by Gil Peterson at the Maroon 34. Cannon and Brodnax led LSU down to the five, where Rabb passed to Hendrix for the touchdown and Davis kicked the extra point for the winning score.

As was common with inclement conditions, the game featured many punts and very few passes. The teams combined for 274 yards on the ground and only 73 yards in the air. Cannon was the game's leading rusher with 53 yards on thirteen carries, but he also fumbled twice, both times deep in LSU territory. "We had to wait for the rain to stop before we went out and warm up", Cannon remembered, "and when it finally quit raining, things weren't much better. They had these plank bridges over pools of water and slop to get you onto the field." His first fumble came in the first quarter at the LSU twenty, but the Bandits were able to hold Mississippi State to a missed field goal attempt. His second fumble was in the fourth quarter at the 13, and the Tigers again were able to hold the Maroons to a missed field goal.

=== At Tulane ===
Battle for the Rag

Team	1	2	3	4	Total
• #1 LSU	0	6	21	35	62
Tulane	0	0	0	0	0

- Date: November 22
- Location: Tulane Stadium
  New Orleans
- Game attendance: 83,221

With one win away from claiming the national championship, (Note: At the time, the wire services named their national champions prior to the bowl games.) LSU blew-out in-state rival Tulane, 62–0. Although the Green Wave had a 3–6 record, they were dangerous and unpredictable; they had defeated Alabama and sixth-ranked Navy. Some viewed the game as a trap game, and Tulane halfback Claude "Boo" Mason even told reporters the previous week, "We'll beat LSU because they'll choke." When Dietzel read Mason's quote in the newspaper, he cut it out, made copies of it, and taped it all over the LSU locker room to serve as motivation.

Before an SEC record 83,221 fans the Tigers get off to a slow start, leading by six points at halftime. "There wasn't panic or anything", said Johnny Robinson. "There was, maybe, a little sense of apprehension because things weren't going the way they were drawn up. There was an uneasy feeling that we'd better start getting things together—and quickly." Soon after the third quarter began, Fugler intercepted a pass from Richie Petitbon and returned it to the Tulane 30-yard line. From here the Tigers took complete control of the game. Rabb scored on a quarterback keep, and later rushing touchdowns by Robinson and Cannon made the score 27–0 at the end of the third quarter. The fourth quarter saw LSU take advantage of Tulane's lack of roster depth with multiple long plays. The first was a 55-yard pass from Matherne to Purvis for a touchdown. Later, Robinson returned a punt 47 yards to the goal line, where Cannon ran it in. The final score of the game was a 45-yard touchdown run by Cannon.

Overall, LSU's offense accounted for 485 yards, with 304 of them coming on the ground. Conversely, Tulane had 81 total yards and were intercepted four times and lost three fumbles. Times-Picayune sportswriter Bill Keefe described the game as such: "Tulane's only mistake was running tame while LSU was running wild."

With a 10–0 regular season record, LSU was crowned national champion by the Associated Press and the Coaches' Poll (UPI), as well as by 37 other selectors. LSU's total first place votes was 130 to win the 1958 National Championship in the AP poll. LSU received 29 of the 35 first-place votes to win the #1 ranking in the Coaches poll. LSU earned the #1 rankings in the AP and Coaches poll during week 6 and held on to the #1 rankings for the rest of the year to win the 1958 National Championship in both major polls.

=== Vs. Clemson (Sugar Bowl) ===
Sugar Bowl

Team	1	2	3	4	Total
#12 Clemson	0	0	0	0	0
• #1 LSU	0	0	7	0	7

- Date: January 1
- Location: Tulane Stadium
  New Orleans
- Game attendance: 80,331

LSU capped off its undefeated season with a 7–0 victory over the Clemson Tigers in the Sugar Bowl. The game's only score was a touchdown in the third quarter, when Cannon completed a nine-yard pass to Mangham in the end zone. LSU's shutout victory over #12 Clemson was convincing and highlighted LSU as the only team in the country to go undefeated. Army, Auburn, and Air Force did not lose all season but they each had one game that ended in a tie.

== Tiger Stadium Championship Plaque ==
The legendary 1958 team compiled LSU's first perfect season since 1908 and became the first squad in school history to win the national title. Looking to build on a previous season record of 5-5, Coach Paul Dietzel's innovative three-platoon system -- the White Team, the Go Team, and the Chinese Bandits -- revolutionized college football. The 1958 Tigers blew through SEC opponents, finishing the league slate with a perfect 6-0 record to win the SEC title. Among the wins was a Homecoming showdown against Florida in front of the first sellout crowd in Tiger Stadium history. LSU capped off the season with a Sugar Bowl win over Clemson, propelling the Tigers to a flawless 11-0 record.

== Roster ==
Roster
No.	Player	Position	Height	Weight	Hometown
White Team
12	Warren Rabb	quarterback	6-0	190	Baton Rouge, Louisiana
20	Billy Cannon	left halfback	6-1	204	Baton Rouge, Louisiana
34	Johnny Robinson	right halfback	6-0	185	Baton Rouge, Louisiana
40	J.W. Brodnax	fullback	6-0	203	Bastrop, Louisiana
51	Max Fugler	center	6-1	203	Ferriday, Louisiana
64	Larry Kahlden	left guard	6-1	210	Weimar, Texas
67	Ed McCreedy	right guard	6-1	195	Biloxi, Mississippi
70	Lynn Leblanc	left tackle	6-2	201	Crowley, Louisiana
72	Bo Strange	right tackle	6-1	202	Baton Rouge, Louisiana
85	Billy Hendrix	left end	6-0	185	Rayville, Louisiana
86	Mickey Mangham	Right end	6-1	192	Kensington, Maryland
Go Team
16	Durel Matherne	quarterback	5-11	188	Lutcher, Louisiana
23	Don Purvis	left halfback	5-7	160	Crystal Springs, Mississippi
33	Donnie Daye	right halfback	5-10	184	Ferriday, Louisiana
44	Tommy Davis	kicker, fullback	6-0	205	Shreveport, Louisiana
50	Bobby Greenwood	center	5-10	195	Lake Charles, Louisiana
63	Al Dampier	left guard	6-1	201	Clayton, Louisiana
66	Mike Stupka	right guard	6-0	205	Bogalusa, Louisiana
73	Jack Frayer	right tackle	6-2	210	Toledo, Ohio
74	Dave McCarty	left tackle	6-2	200	Rayville, Louisiana
82	Don Norwood	right end	6-3	202	Baton Rouge, Louisiana
83	Scotty McClain	left end	6-2	180	Smackover, Arkansas
Chinese Bandits
10	Darryl Jenkins	quarterback	6-1	163	Franklinton, Louisiana
22	Hart Bourque	right halfback	5-8	165	Gonzales, Louisiana
32	Henry Lee Roberts	left halfback	6-0	172	North Little Rock, Arkansas
43	Merle Schexnaildre	fullback	5-9	182	Houma, Louisiana
53	John Langan	center	6-0	183	Carbondale, Illinois
61	Tommy Lott	right guard	5-9	188	Texarkana, Arkansas
65	Emile Fournet	left guard	5-11	195	Bogalusa, Louisiana
71	Duane Leopard	right tackle	6-2	205	Baton Rouge, Louisiana
75	Mel Branch	left tackle	6-1	210	DeRidder, Louisiana
80	Andy Bourgeois	left end	5-10	174	New Orleans, Louisiana
81	Gaynell Kinchen	right end	6-3	196	Baton Rouge, Louisiana
Others
11	Elton Upshaw	quarterback	6-1	185	Monroe, Louisiana
14	Edgar Charbonnet	quarterback	5-10	170	Ponchatoula, Louisiana
21	Tommy Neck	left halfback	5-11	180	Marksville, Louisiana
24	Ken McMichael	right halfback	5-11	195	Minden, Louisiana
30	Frank Pannebaker	fullback	5-10	205	Mifflintown, Pennsylvania
31	Al Ott	right halfback	5-9	165	Gretna, Louisiana
41	Charles Tarter	fullback	6-3	218	Birmingham, Alabama
52	Ken Wittman	center	5-11	190	Pass Christian, Mississippi
54	John Dunham	center	6-4	215	Shreveport, Louisiana
55	George O'Neal	center	6-1	195	Baton Rouge, Louisiana
60	Freddie Davidson	right guard	6-1	190	New Iberia, Louisiana
62	Manson Nelson	right guard	5-9	185	Ferriday, Louisiana
68	Herb Lacassagne	left guard	6-2	215	New Orleans, Louisiana
69	GeraLd Frey	right guard	5-11	200	Iota, Louisiana
76	Bobby Richards	left tackle	6-2	210	Oak Ridge, Tennessee
77	Carroll Bergeron	right tackle	6-0	215	Houma, Louisiana
78	Joe Dosher	right tackle	6-4	215	Jena, Louisiana
79	Gus Riess	left tackle	6-0	215	New Orleans, Louisiana
84	Jimmy Bond	left end	6-1	190	Bogalusa, Louisiana
87	Jimmy Givens	left end	6-1	185	Bogalusa, Louisiana
88	David Parish	right end	6-3	200	Hammond, Louisiana
89	Fred Blankenship	right end	6-4	199	North Little Rock, Arkansas

== See also ==
- List of undefeated NCAA Division I football teams
