= 1958 Alabama Crimson Tide football team =

American college football season

1958 Alabama Crimson Tide football
- Conference: Southeastern Conference
- Record: 5–4–1 (3–4–1 SEC)
- Head coach: Bear Bryant (1st season)
- Captains: Dave Sington; Bobby Smith
- Home stadium: Denny Stadium; Legion Field; Ladd Stadium

1958 Southeastern Conference football standings
	Conf.					Overall
Team	W		L		T	W		L		T
No. 1 LSU $	6	–	0	–	0	11	–	0	–	0
No. 4 Auburn	6	–	0	–	1	9	–	0	–	1
No. 11 Ole Miss	4	–	2	–	0	9	–	2	–	0
Vanderbilt	2	–	1	–	3	5	–	2	–	3
Tennessee	4	–	3	–	0	4	–	6	–	0
Alabama	3	–	4	–	1	5	–	4	–	1
Kentucky	3	–	4	–	1	5	–	4	–	1
No. 14 Florida	2	–	3	–	1	6	–	4	–	1
Georgia Tech	2	–	3	–	1	5	–	4	–	1
Georgia	2	–	4	–	0	4	–	6	–	0
Tulane	1	–	5	–	0	3	–	7	–	0
Mississippi State	1	–	6	–	0	3	–	6	–	0
$ – Conference champion; Ole Miss's game against Houston counted in the conference standings.; Rankings from AP Poll

The 1958 Alabama Crimson Tide football team (variously "Alabama", "UA" or "Bama") represented the University of Alabama in the 1958 college football season. It was the Crimson Tide's 64th overall and 25th season as a member of the Southeastern Conference (SEC). The team was led by head coach Bear Bryant, in his first year, and played their home games at Denny Stadium in Tuscaloosa, Legion Field in Birmingham and at Ladd Stadium in Mobile, Alabama. They finished with a record of five wins, four losses and one tie (5–4–1 overall, 3–4–1 in the SEC). As they finished the season above .500, Alabama secured its first winning season since 1953, and their five victories gave Bryant more wins games in one season than former head coach Jennings B. Whitworth did in previous three.

On December 3, 1957, the university formally introduced then Texas A&M head coach and former Crimson Tide player Bear Bryant as the new head coach of the Crimson Tide. In the season opener, Bama led eventual national champion LSU 3–0 at the half before they lost 13–3, and the next week played a ranked Vanderbilt team to a scoreless tie. In their third game, the Crimson Tide defeated Furman for the first victory of the Bryant era. After a loss at Tennessee, Alabama then defeated then No. 19 Mississippi State for their first victory over a ranked team since 1953 and followed that with a win over Georgia on homecoming.

The Crimson Tide were then upset at Tulane on a Friday evening, but bounced back with wins over Georgia Tech and Memphis State that secured Alabama's first winning season since 1953. After they closed the season with a loss against Auburn, Alabama declined an invitation to compete in the Bluegrass Bowl to end Bryant's first season and became the only Bryant coached team at Alabama not to participate in a bowl game.

== Schedule ==
Date	Opponent	Site	Result	Attendance	Source
September 27	No. 15 LSU	Ladd Stadium; Mobile, AL (rivalry)	L 3–13	34,000	
October 4	No. 20 Vanderbilt	Legion Field; Birmingham, AL	T 0–0	36,000	
October 11	Furman*	Denny Stadium; Tuscaloosa, AL	W 29–6	17,000	
October 18	at Tennessee	Shields–Watkins Field; Knoxville, TN (Third Saturday in October)	L 7–14	34,200	
October 25	at No. 19 Mississippi State	Scott Field; Starkville, MS (rivalry)	W 9–7	26,000	
November 1	Georgia^{†}	Denny Stadium; Tuscaloosa, AL (rivalry)	W 12–0	28,500	
November 7	at Tulane	Tulane Stadium; New Orleans, LA	L 7–13	34,000	
November 15	at No. 20 Georgia Tech	Grant Field; Atlanta, GA (rivalry)	W 17–8	44,726	
November 22	No. T–19 (small) Memphis State*	Denny Stadium; Tuscaloosa, AL	W 14–0	26,500	
November 29	vs. No. 2 Auburn	Legion Field; Birmingham, AL (Iron Bowl)	L 8–14	44,000	
*Non-conference game; ^{†}Homecoming; Rankings from AP Poll released prior to the game

== Game summaries ==
=== LSU ===
Team	1	2	3	4	Total
• #15 LSU	0	0	7	6	13
Alabama	0	3	0	0	3

- Date: September 27
- Location: Ladd Stadium
  Mobile, AL
- Game attendance: 34,000

To open the Bear Bryant era, Alabama led 3–0 at halftime but lost 13–3 to the eventual national champion LSU Tigers in Ladd Stadium in Mobile. After a scoreless first quarter, the Crimson Tide took a 3–0 halftime lead after Fred Sington Jr. connected on an 18-yard field goal. Midway through the half, a section of bleachers in the north end zone collapsed and resulted in 60 spectators being injured. The collapse resulted in a stoppage of play while emergency responders worked to assist those injured by the collapse.

LSU took a 7–3 lead in the third quarter when Warren Rabb threw a nine-yard touchdown pass to Johnny Robinson that capped a 67-yard drive. Billy Cannon then scored on a 12-yard touchdown run in the fourth quarter that made the final score 13–3. For the game, the Tigers were led by head coach Paul Dietzel who previously served as an assistant coach for Bryant during his tenure at Kentucky.

=== Vanderbilt ===
Team	1	2	3	4	Total
#20 Vanderbilt	0	0	0	0	0
Alabama	0	0	0	0	0

- Date: October 4
- Location: Legion Field
  Birmingham, AL
- Game attendance: 36,000

In their first Legion Field game of the 1958 season, the Crimson Tide played the Vanderbilt Commodores to a 0–0 tie in Birmingham.

=== Furman ===
Team	1	2	3	4	Total
Furman	0	0	6	0	6
• Alabama	20	3	6	0	29

- Date: October 11
- Location: Denny Stadium
  Tuscaloosa, AL
- Game attendance: 17,000

In their first Denny Stadium game of the 1958 season, the Crimson Tide notched the first victory of the Bryant era with this 29–6 win over the Furman Purple Hurricane in Tuscaloosa. The Crimson Tide took an early 20–0 lead after they scored three touchdowns in the final four minutes of the first quarter. Bobby Jackson scored first on a two-yard run, the second was scored on a 16-yard Jackson pass to Laurien Stapp and the third on a 56-yard Gary O'Steen punt return. A 24-yard Pete Reaves field goal in the second quarter extended the Alabama lead to 23–0 at halftime. In the third quarter, Furman scored their only points of the game on a nine-yard Roy Nickles touchdown run. The Crimson Tide responded with a 61-yard Bobby Smith touchdown pass to O'Steen that made the final score 29–6.

=== Tennessee ===
Third Saturday in October

Team	1	2	3	4	Total
Alabama	0	0	0	7	7
• Tennessee	0	7	7	0	14

- Date: October 18
- Location: Shields-Watkins Field
  Knoxville, TN
- Game attendance: 34,200

In their annual rivalry game against Tennessee, a pair of Billy Majors touchdowns for the Volunteers provided for the final margin in their 14–7 victory in Knoxville. After a scoreless first quarter, the Vols took a 7–0 halftime lead when Majors scored on a one-yard run on the first play of the second quarter. He then extended the Tennessee lead to 14–0 in the third on a seven-yard run, before Alabama made the final score 14–7 on a one-yard Bobby Jackson touchdown run. In the game, Alabama fumbled the ball five times and Tennessee recovered three of them.

=== Mississippi State ===
Team	1	2	3	4	Total
• Alabama	3	0	6	0	9
#19 Mississippi State	0	0	0	7	7

- Date: October 25
- Location: Scott Field
  Starkville, MS

On what was homecoming in Starkville, the Crimson Tide upset the Mississippi State Maroons 9–7 and secured Bryant's first SEC victory. Alabama took a 3–0 first quarter lead after Fred Sington Jr. connected on a 22-yard field goal. Still up by three in the third quarter, the Crimson Tide scored their only touchdown of the game on a 21-yard Bobby Jackson pass to Norbie Ronsonet and extended their lead to 9–0. The Maroons managed their only points late in the fourth on a six-yard Billy Stacy touchdown run that made the final score 9–7. The victory was Alabama's first over a ranked opponent since their win over Auburn in 1953.

=== Georgia ===
Team	1	2	3	4	Total
Georgia	0	0	0	0	0
• Alabama	6	0	0	6	12

- Date: November 1
- Location: Denny Stadium
  Tuscaloosa, AL
- Game attendance: 28,500

On homecoming in Tuscaloosa, Alabama shutout the Georgia Bulldogs 12–0 for their second consecutive conference victory. The Crimson Tide took a 6–0 first quarter lead after Gary O'Steen scored on a 14-yard run and then made the final score 12–0 late in the fourth quarter on a short Bobby Jackson touchdown run. The victory gave Alabama their first two-game winning streak since the 1954 season.

=== Tulane ===
Team	1	2	3	4	Total
Alabama	0	0	0	7	7
• Tulane	6	0	7	0	13

- Date: November 7
- Location: Tulane Stadium
  New Orleans, LA
- Game attendance: 34,000

On a Friday evening at New Orleans, the Crimson Tide were defeated 13–7 by the Tulane Green Wave after they turned the ball over on downs late in the fourth quarter. Richie Petitbon gave Tulane an early 6–0 lead with his two-yard touchdown run in the first quarter. Petitbon then extended the Green Wave lead to 13–0 late in the third on a one-yard run before Alabama scored their lone touchdown of the game. The only Crimson Tide points came on a one-yard Bobby Jackson touchdown run that capped a 73-yard drive in the fourth quarter.

=== Georgia Tech ===
Team	1	2	3	4	Total
• Alabama	17	0	0	0	17
#20 Georgia Tech	0	0	8	0	8

- Date: November 15
- Location: Grant Field
  Atlanta, GA
- Game attendance: 44,726

Behind a 17-point first quarter, the Crimson Tide upset the Georgia Tech Yellow Jackets 17–8 on homecoming at Grant Field. All 17 first quarter points were scored on drives that immediately followed a turnover. Bobby Jackson first scored on a one-yard touchdown run to cap a drive that started after a fumble was recovered by Baxter Booth. Duff Morrison's interception then set up the next Alabama scoring drive that ended when Pete Reaves connected on a 19-yard field goal for a 10–0 lead. The lead was then extended to 17–0 on a five-yard Jackson run that completed a drive started at the Tech 20-yard line when Milton Frank recovered a fumble. The only Yellow Jacket points came in the third quarter when a Calvin James fumble was recovered by Billy Shaw for a touchdown that made the final score 17–8 after a successful two-point conversion.

=== Memphis State ===
Team	1	2	3	4	Total
Memphis State	0	0	0	0	0
• Alabama	6	8	0	0	14

- Date: November 22
- Location: Denny Stadium
  Tuscaloosa, AL
- Game attendance: 26,500

In what was the first all-time meeting against Memphis State, the Crimson Tide shutout the Tigers 14–0 in the final Denny Stadium game of the season. Alabama took a 6–0 first quarter lead after Bobby Jackson threw a 62-yard touchdown pass to Marlin Dyess on the first offensive play of the game. Jackson then scored what proved to be the final points of the game with his 18-yard touchdown run in the second quarter. He then successfully converted the two-point conversion that made the final score 14–0.

=== Auburn ===
Iron Bowl

Team	1	2	3	4	Total
• #2 Auburn	7	0	0	7	14
Alabama	0	0	0	8	8

- Date: November 29
- Location: Legion Field
  Birmingham, AL
- Game attendance: 44,000

Against rival Auburn, the Crimson Tide nearly upset the No. 2 ranked Tigers but lost 14–8 at Legion Field in what was the closest game between the schools since the 1953 season. The Tigers' took an early 7–0 lead after Dick Wood threw a three-yard touchdown pass to Jim Pettus in the first quarter. Neither team would score again until late in the fourth quarter when Auburn went up 14–0 on a one-yard Jim Reynolds touchdown run. Alabama responded with a nine-yard Marlin Dyess touchdown run that cut the Tigers' lead to 14–8 after they converted a two-point conversion.

== Bluegrass Bowl ==
After their victory over Memphis State, Alabama players voted to accept any potential bowl bid if one was extended to the team. As they entered their final game of the season against Auburn, officials from the Bluegrass Bowl announced that the Crimson Tide was their top choice to participate in the inaugural event regardless of the outcome against the Tigers. Although the Crimson Tide were their top choice, on December 1, bowl officials announced that Florida State and Oklahoma State would participate in the game.

It was reported that prior to the announcement, the game was to have seen a rematch of Alabama against Vanderbilt, but that no deal was reached. After the Crimson Tide declined the invitation, Florida State accepted it. Years later, Bryant stated he regretted he did not accept the bid as it would have allowed for additional practice time at the conclusion of the season. The 1958 season also marked the only one where a Bryant-led team at Alabama failed to participate in a bowl game.

== Freshmen squad ==
Prior to the 1972 NCAA University Division football season, NCAA rules prohibited freshmen from participating on the varsity team, and as such many schools fielded freshmen teams. For the 1958 season, the Alabama freshmen squad was coached by Sam Bailey and finished their season with a record of two wins, zero losses and one tie (2–0–1). In their first game against the Mississippi State Baby Maroons, a 27-yard Jimmy Spencer field goal fell short with under a minute left, and the game ended in a scoreless tie at Starkville. In their second game, the Crimson Tide defeated Tulane 25–6 before 3,000 fans at Denny Stadium. After the game was tied 6–6 at halftime, Alabama scored 19 unanswered points in the second half to win. Touchdowns were scored by Mal Moore on a one-yard run, a 37-yard Moore pass to Tommy Brooker and on a 22-yard Ronnie Davis pass to Steve Anderson. The Baby Tide then closed the season with a 14–6 win over Auburn in a game that saw touchdowns scored of runs of 10-yards by Jerry Rich and one-yard by Pat Trammell.

== Personnel ==
=== Varsity letter winners ===
Player	Hometown	Position
Charles Allen	Athens, Alabama	Tackle
Jim Blevins	Moulton, Alabama	Tackle
Baxter Booth	Athens, Alabama	End
Jerre Brannen	Anniston, Alabama	End
Marshall Brown	Ladysmith, Wisconsin	Fullback
Donald Cochran	Birmingham, Alabama	Guard
Marlin Dyess	Elba, Alabama	Halfback
Milton Frank	Huntsville, Alabama	Guard
Charles Gray	Pell City, Alabama	End
William Hannah	Indianapolis, Indiana	Tackle
Bobby Jackson	Mobile, Alabama	Quarterback
Bud Moore	Birmingham, Alabama	End
Duff Morrison	Memphis, Tennessee	Halfback
Robert O'Steen	Anniston, Alabama	Fullback
Don Parsons	Houston, Texas	Guard
Gary Phillips	Dothan, Alabama	Guard
John Paul Poole	Florence, Alabama	End
Pete Reaves	Bessemer, Alabama	Guard
Kenneth Roberts	Anniston, Alabama	Center
Norbie Ronsonet	Biloxi, Mississippi	End
Walter Sansing	West Blocton, Alabama	Fullback
Wayne Sims	Columbiana, Alabama	Guard
Dave Sington	Birmingham, Alabama	Tackle
Fred Sington Jr.	Birmingham, Alabama	Tackle
Bobby Smith	Brewton, Alabama	Quarterback
Laurien “Goobie” Stapp	Birmingham, Alabama	Quarterback/Placekicker
Carl Valletto	Oakmont, Pennsylvania	End
William “Buddy” Wesley	Talladega, Alabama	Fullback
Tommy White	West Blocton, Alabama	Fullback
Mack Wise	Elba, Alabama	Halfback

=== Coaching staff ===
Name	Position	Seasons at Alabama	Alma mater
Bear Bryant	Head coach	1	Alabama (1936)
Sam Bailey	Assistant coach	1	Ouachita Baptist (1949)
Jerry Claiborne	Assistant coach	1	Kentucky (1950)
Phil Cutchin	Assistant coach	1	Kentucky (1943)
Jim Goostree	Assistant coach	2	Tennessee (1952)
Pat James	Assistant coach	1	Kentucky (1951)
Bobby Drake Keith	Assistant coach	1	Texas A&M (1957)
Carney Laslie	Assistant coach	2	Alabama (1934)
Bobby Luna	Assistant coach	1	Alabama (1954)
Dee Powell	Assistant coach	1	Texas A&M (1957)
Hayden Riley	Assistant coach	1	Alabama (1948)
Gene Stallings	Assistant coach	1	Texas A&M (1957)

== NFL draft ==
At the conclusion of the season several members of the 1958 squad were drafted into the National Football League. These players included: Bobby Jackson in the seventh round to the Green Bay Packers, Ernie Moore in the 29th round to the Los Angeles Rams and Dave Sington in the 30th round to the New York Giants.
