= Max Fugler =

American football player

No. 51
- Positions: Center, running back

Personal information
- Listed height: 6 ft 1 in (1.85 m)
- Listed weight: 203 lb (92 kg)

Career information
- High school: Ferriday (LA)
- College: LSU (1957–1959)

Awards and highlights
- National champion (1958); First-team All-American (1958); Third-team All-American (1959); First-team All-SEC (1958)

Max Fugler is an American former football player for the LSU Tigers of Louisiana State University. He played center on the 1958 team that won the national championship and the 1959 Sugar Bowl.

== High school ==
Fugler played at Ferriday High School where his team won three straight Class A state championships from 1954–1956 under coach Johnny Robertson.

== College ==
Fugler began his LSU career as a running back in 1957, seeing limited playing time as he rushed 16 times on the season for 54 yards. In 1958 and 1959, Fugler was a part of the "White Team," the starting unit in coach Paul Dietzel's 3-platoon system and played both offense and defense. He made several key plays and goal-line stands on defense during LSU's championship season in 1958, and blocked for All-SEC backs Billy Cannon, Johnny Robinson, and Warren Rabb on offense. He was named an All-American in 1958 by the Football Writers Association of America (FWAA), and an All-SEC selection by United Press International (UPI).
