= 1958 All-SEC football team =

American college football all-star team

The 1958 All-SEC football team consists of American football players selected to the All-Southeastern Conference (SEC) chosen by various selectors for the 1958 college football season. LSU won the conference.

== All-SEC selections ==
=== Ends ===
- Jerry Wilson, Auburn (AP-1, UPI-1)
- Don Fleming, Florida (AP-1, UPI-1)
- Larry Grantham, Ole Miss (AP-2, UPI-2)
- Billy Hendrix, LSU (AP-2, UPI-2)
- Dave Hudson, Florida (AP-3)
- Jerry Burch, Georgia Tech (AP-3)

=== Tackles ===
- Vel Heckman, Florida (AP-1, UPI-1)
- Cleve Wester, Auburn (AP-1, UPI-1)
- Nat Dye, Georgia (AP-2, UPI-2)
- Charles Strange, LSU (AP-2)
- Dave Sington, Alabama (AP-3, UPI-2)
- Bob Lindon, Kentucky (AP-3)

=== Guards ===
- George Deiderich, Vanderbilt (AP-1, UPI-1)
- Zeke Smith, Auburn (AP-1, UPI-1)
- Don Cochran, Alabama (AP-2)
- Jack Benson, Miss. St. (AP-2, UPI-2)
- Bobby Urano, Tennessee (AP-3, UPI-2)
- Larry Kahlden, LSU (AP-3)

=== Centers ===
- Jackie Burkett, Auburn (AP-1, UPI-2)
- Max Fugler, LSU (AP-2, UPI-1)
- Maxie Baughan, Georgia Tech (College Football Hall of Fame)(AP-3)

=== Quarterbacks ===
- Warren Rabb, LSU (AP-1)
- Richie Petitbon, Tulane (AP-2, UPI-1)
- Billy Stacy, Miss. St. (AP-3, UPI-2)
- Bobby Franklin, Ole Miss (UPI-2)

=== Halfbacks ===
- Billy Cannon, LSU (College Football Hall of Fame) (AP-1, UPI-1)
- Johnny Robinson, LSU (AP-1)
- Tom Moore, Vanderbilt (AP-2, UPI-1)
- Bobby Cravens, Kentucky (AP-2, UPI-2)
- Tommy Lorino, Auburn (AP-3)
- Floyd Faucette, Georgia Tech (AP-3)

=== Fullbacks ===
- Charlie Flowers, Ole Miss (College Football Hall of Fame) (AP-1, UPI-2)
- Theron Sapp, Georgia (AP-2, UPI-1)
- J. W. Brodnax, LSU (AP-3)

== Key ==
AP = Associated Press.

UPI = United Press International

Bold = Consensus first-team selection by both AP and UPI

== See also ==
- 1958 College Football All-America Team
