= 1958 Georgia Tech Yellow Jackets football team =

American college football season

1958 Georgia Tech Yellow Jackets football
- Conference: Southeastern Conference
- Record: 5–4–1 (2–3–1 SEC)
- Head coach: Bobby Dodd (14th season)
- Captain: Foster Watkins
- Home stadium: Grant Field

1958 Southeastern Conference football standings
	Conf.					Overall
Team	W		L		T	W		L		T
No. 1 LSU $	6	–	0	–	0	11	–	0	–	0
No. 4 Auburn	6	–	0	–	1	9	–	0	–	1
No. 11 Ole Miss	4	–	2	–	0	9	–	2	–	0
Vanderbilt	2	–	1	–	3	5	–	2	–	3
Tennessee	4	–	3	–	0	4	–	6	–	0
Alabama	3	–	4	–	1	5	–	4	–	1
Kentucky	3	–	4	–	1	5	–	4	–	1
No. 14 Florida	2	–	3	–	1	6	–	4	–	1
Georgia Tech	2	–	3	–	1	5	–	4	–	1
Georgia	2	–	4	–	0	4	–	6	–	0
Tulane	1	–	5	–	0	3	–	7	–	0
Mississippi State	1	–	6	–	0	3	–	6	–	0
$ – Conference champion; Ole Miss's game against Houston counted in the conference standings.; Rankings from AP Poll

The 1958 Georgia Tech Yellow Jackets football team represented the Georgia Institute of Technology during the 1958 college football season. The Yellow Jackets were led by 14th-year head coach Bobby Dodd, played their home games at Grant Field in Atlanta, and compiled a 5–4–1 record.

The team's statistical leaders included Fred Braselton with 310 passing yards and Floyd Faucette with 473 rushing yards.

== Schedule ==
Date	Opponent	Rank	Site	Result	Attendance	Source
September 20	at Kentucky		McLean Stadium; Lexington, KY	L 0–13	30,000	
September 26	Florida State*		Grant Field; Atlanta, GA	W 17–3	40,391	
October 4	Tulane		Grant Field; Atlanta, GA	W 14–0	38,000	
October 11	Tennessee		Grant Field; Atlanta, GA (rivalry)	W 21–7	44,726	
October 18	No. 2 Auburn		Grant Field; Atlanta, GA (rivalry)	T 7–7	44,726	
October 25	at SMU*	No. 17	Cotton Bowl; Dallas, TX	L 0–20	27,000	
November 1	at Duke*		Duke Stadium; Durham, NC	W 10–8	30,000	
November 8	No. 17 Clemson*		Grant Field; Atlanta, GA (rivalry)	W 13–0	44,726	
November 15	Alabama^{†}	No. 20	Grant Field; Atlanta, GA (rivalry)	L 8–17	44,726	
November 29	at Georgia		Sanford Stadium; Athens, GA (rivalry)	L 3–16	50,000	
*Non-conference game; ^{†}Homecoming; Rankings from AP Poll released prior to the game
