= 1958 Miami Hurricanes football team =

American college football season

1958 Miami Hurricanes football
- Conference: Independent
- Record: 2–8
- Head coach: Andy Gustafson (11th season)
- Home stadium: Burdine Stadium

1958 Southern major college football independents records
	Conf.			Overall
Team	W	L	T	W		L		T
No. 19 Oklahoma State		–		8	–	3	–	0
Florida State		–		7	–	4	–	0
Navy		–		6	–	3	–	0
Texas Tech		–		3	–	7	–	0
Miami (FL)		–		2	–	8	–	0
Rankings from AP poll

The 1958 Miami Hurricanes football team represented the University of Miami as an independent during the 1958 college football season. Led by 11th-year head coach Andy Gustafson, the Hurricanes played their home games at Burdine Stadium in Miami, Florida. Miami finished the season 2–8.

== Schedule ==
Date	Opponent	Rank	Site	Result	Attendance	Source
September 26	No. 14 Wisconsin	No. 15	Burdine Stadium; Miami, FL	L 0–20	62,084	
October 4	at Baylor		Baylor Stadium; Waco, TX	W 14–8	20,000	
October 10	No. 11 LSU		Burdine Stadium; Miami, FL	L 0–41	40,614	
October 25	at Boston College		Alumni Stadium; Chestnut Hill, MA	L 2–6	11,000	
October 31	Vanderbilt		Burdine Stadium; Miami, FL	L 15–28	25,400	
November 7	Florida State		Burdine Stadium; Miami, FL (rivalry)	L 6–17	31,879	
November 14	Maryland		Burdine Stadium; Miami, FL	L 14–26	26,747	
November 21	Houston		Burdine Stadium; Miami, FL	L 26–37	24,822	
November 29	vs. No. 14 Florida		Gator Bowl Stadium; Jacksonville, FL (rivalry)	L 9–12	24,000–24,641	
December 6	Oregon		Burdine Stadium; Miami, FL	W 2–0	22,898	
Rankings from AP Poll released prior to the game

== Roster ==
- Jim Otto, Jr.
