= Charlie Flowers =

American football player (1937–2014)

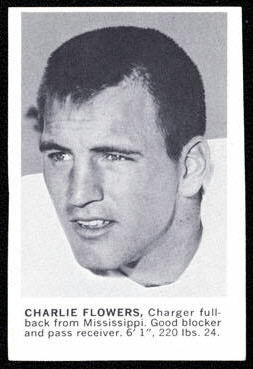

No. 41
- Position: Fullback

Personal information
- Born: June 28, 1937; Marianna, Arkansas, U.S.
- Died: December 7, 2014 (aged 77); Atlanta, U.S.
- Listed height: 6 ft 1 in (1.85 m)
- Listed weight: 220 lb (100 kg)

Career information
- High school: Lee (Marianna)
- College: Ole Miss
- NFL draft: 1959: 12th round, 142nd overall pick
- AFL draft: 1960: 2nd round

Career history
- Los Angeles/San Diego Chargers (1960-1961); New York Titans (1962)

Awards and highlights
- Unanimous All-American (1959); 2× First-team All-SEC (1958, 1959)

Career AFL statistics
- Rushing yards: 416
- Rushing average: 3.7
- Receptions: 35
- Receiving yards: 383
- Total touchdowns: 5
- Stats at Pro Football Reference
- College Football Hall of Fame

Flavy Charles (Charlie) Flowers (June 28, 1937 – December 7, 2014) was an American professional football player. He played college football for the Ole Miss Rebels of the University of Mississippi, and was elected to the College Football Hall of Fame in 1997.

== Early life ==
Flowers was born on June 28, 1937, in Marianna, Arkansas. His parents were both from Mississippi and he had a large family in Mississippi. As a high school sophomore, his Marianna High School coach Bill Landers took him to a University of Mississippi (Ole Miss) football game, and introduced Flowers to Ole Miss coach John Vaught. Flowers continued attending Ole Miss games during his high school years.

== College football ==
Flowers eventually attended the University of Mississippi, where he excelled as a football player and academically. He was 6 ft (1.83 m) and 198 pounds (89.8 kg) during his college playing days.

He played three varsity seasons on the football team (1957-1959), playing fullback and outside linebacker, under coach John Vaught. In his first season, he had only 59 rushing attempts, but averaged 7.4 yards per attempt. By his junior year, he had 107 attempts for 557 yards and two touchdowns, and in his senior year, Waters had 141 attempts for 733 yards (5.2 yards per carry) and 11 touchdowns. He led the Southeastern Conference (SEC) in rushing yards and touchdowns in 1959.

In 1959, Flowers was a first-team consensus All-American, and an Academic All-American for the second time. He was also named to the All-South team. He was twice named the national and SEC Back of the Week that year, and led the SEC in scoring, rushing, and rushing touchdowns. He was second nationally in rushing touchdowns and sixth in rushing yards. He was fifth in Heisman Trophy voting. As a linebacker, he lined up behind three year teammate Larry Grantham at defensive end.

The 1959 Ole Miss team had a 10–1 record and won the 1960 Sugar Bowl over Louisiana State University (LSU) 21–0; the only team Ole Miss lost to during the season. He was team captain that year, and its leader. During the year, Ole Miss outscored its opponents 350–21 with eight shutouts. Flowers took particular pride in the fact that 42 of the team's 43 players graduated, and many earned considerable achievements in their lives. The team was ranked number 2 at the end of the season, behind 10–0 Syracuse, which Flowers believed was because of the one loss to LSU. He blamed himself for missing the tackle on LSU Heisman Trophy winner Billy Cannon that allowed the one, winning, touchdown in the game.

In his three years at Ole Miss, the team was 28–4–1, and also won the 1958 Sugar Bowl over the University of Texas, 39–7. On December 27, 1958, Ole Miss won the Gator Bowl over the University of Florida, 7–3. In 1957, Ole Miss went 8–1–1 and was ranked 7th, and in 1958, it had an 8–2 record and was ranked 11th nationally. Flowers was twice named All-SEC as a player. At the end of his college career, Flowers had gained 1,730 yards rushing, which was a school record at the time, as was his 5.64 yards per carry average.

== Professional football ==
Flowers was selected by the National Football League's (NFL) New York Giants in the 12th round of the 1959 NFL draft (heading into the 1960 season). In December 1959, he was signed by the Giants. However, in order to retain his eligibility to play in the Sugar Bowl, he requested to keep the contract a secret until January 2, 1960. Wellington Mara accepted this request and the team did not submit the contract to league commissioner Pete Rozelle for approval. Flowers was also drafted by the Los Angeles Chargers in late 1959, in the first American Football League Draft. The Chargers offered him more money to play for them. He accepted their offer and withdrew from his contract with the Giants. The Giants attempted to enforce the contract, but their plea was rejected due to their unclean hands.

As a professional player, Flowers was listed at 6 ft 1 in (1.85 m) and 220 pounds (99.8 kg). Flowers professional career was limited by an ankle injury. He played sparingly in his first season, starting only two games. The team moved to San Diego the following year, and Flowers started 9 games, but still only had 51 rushing attempts (to go along with 16 receptions). In August 1962, he was traded to the New York Titans (known later as the New York Jets) for a draft pick, for what would be his final season. He started three games that year, dislocating his ankle in the Titans' third game, against the Buffalo Bills. He was released by the Titans after their fourth game, and never played again.

== Honors and awards ==
Flowers has received the following awards and honors, among others;

- College Football Hall of Fame (1997)
- Arkansas Sports Hall of Fame (2010)
- SEC Legends Class of 1999
- Ole Miss Sports Hall of Fame (1988)
- Mississippi Sports Hall of Fame (1985)
- All-Time Sugar Bowl Team for 1955-62
- Ole Miss Team of the Century (1992)
- Distinguished American Award, Ole Miss Chapter of the National Football Foundation and College Hall of Fame (1985)

== Personal life ==
In 1962, Flowers received his law degree from Ole Miss. After moving to Atlanta in 1965, he sold municipal bonds for various large firms, eventually holding the position of vice-president, until his retirement.

== Death ==
Flowers died on December 7, 2014, at the age of 77 following a long illness. He was married to his wife Sharon for 55 years, and had three children. After his death, the Charlie Flowers Leadership Fund for Athletics was established at Ole Miss, aimed at student-athletes.
