= Vel Heckman =

American football player (1936–2024)

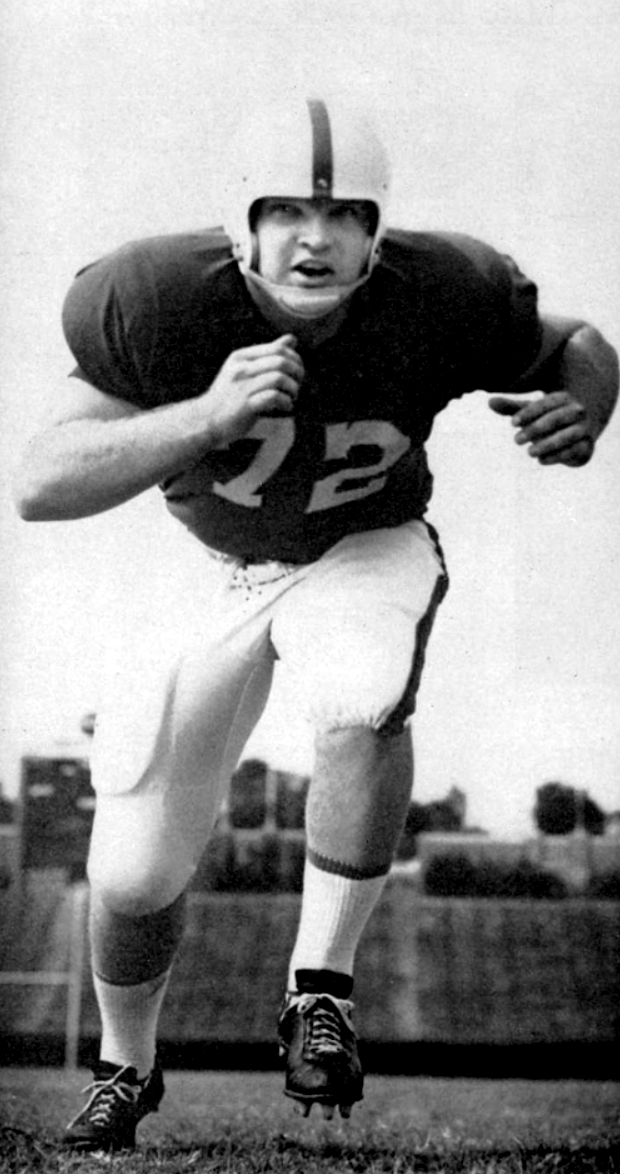
- Heckman from 1959 Seminole yearbook

No. 72 – Florida Gators
- Position: Tackle
- Class: Graduate

Personal information
- Born: July 27, 1936
- Died: September 24, 2024 (aged 88)

Career information
- College: Florida (1956–1958)

Awards and highlights
- First-team All-American (1958); First-team All-SEC (1958)

Velles Alvin Heckman (July 27, 1936 – September 24, 2024) was an American college football player. He played at the tackle position for the Florida Gators football team of the University of Florida, and was selected as a first-team All-American in 1958.

== College football ==
Heckman was raised in Allentown, Pennsylvania. He enrolled at the University of Florida in 1954, but dropped out of the university in 1955. He returned in 1956 and played at the tackle position for head coach Bob Woodruff's Florida Gators football teams from 1956 to 1958. After the 1956 season, he was ranked as one of the best sophomores in the Southeastern Conference (SEC). He became a star as a senior in 1958. Bill Kastelz, the sports editor of the Jacksonville Times-Union, wrote that Heckman's play reached All-American levels against No. 3-ranked LSU on October 25, 1958. The following week, an injury to one of Florida's tackles led coach Woodruff to use an unorthodox strategy of shifting Heckman between the right and left tackle positions during the Auburn-Florida rivalry game. After the game, Woodruff said, "Heckman probably will be selected All America for his play." Bill Kastelz wrote: "Big, fast and tough, he outshone all of Auburn's great linemen." Auburn coach Shug Jordan said of the strategy: "There should be a law to prevent things like that. We were supposed to run plays where Heckman wasn't, and he's there now."

After the 1958 season, Heckman was selected as a first-team All-American tackle by the Football Writers Association of America, Notre Dame Scholastic, and Football Digest. He also received first-team All-SEC honors from the Associated Press and United Press International, as well as the Daytona Beach Quarterback Club's award as the outstanding senior college football player in the State of Florida. In May 1959, Heckman and golfer Tommy Aaron were the first recipients of the "Gold Gator" award presented to a University of Florida student with "nationally recognized athletic prowess."

== Later career ==
Heckman was selected by the San Francisco 49ers in the 10th round (119th overall pick) of the 1958 NFL draft. He signed with the 49ers in January 1959, and indicated in the 1959 Seminole yearbook that he intended to play pro football after graduating. However, he did not appear in any regular season NFL games. He later worked as a high school football coach in Winter Garden, Florida.

== Later life and death ==
Heckman was married to Frances Carol Geddings from April 1999 until his death in September 2024. Together they had 11 grandchildren and two great grandchildren.

Heckman was inducted into the University of Florida Athletic Hall of Fame as a "Gator Great".

Vel Heckman died on September 24, 2024, at the age of 88.

== See also ==
- 1958 College Football All-America Team
- Florida Gators football, 1950–59
- List of Florida Gators football All-Americans
- List of University of Florida Athletic Hall of Fame members
