= 1958 Mississippi State Maroons football team =

American college football season

1958 Mississippi State Maroons football
- Conference: Southeastern Conference
- Record: 3–6 (1–6 SEC)
- Head coach: Wade Walker (3rd season)
- Home stadium: Scott Field; Mississippi Veterans Memorial Stadium

1958 Southeastern Conference football standings
	Conf.					Overall
Team	W		L		T	W		L		T
No. 1 LSU $	6	–	0	–	0	11	–	0	–	0
No. 4 Auburn	6	–	0	–	1	9	–	0	–	1
No. 11 Ole Miss	4	–	2	–	0	9	–	2	–	0
Vanderbilt	2	–	1	–	3	5	–	2	–	3
Tennessee	4	–	3	–	0	4	–	6	–	0
Alabama	3	–	4	–	1	5	–	4	–	1
Kentucky	3	–	4	–	1	5	–	4	–	1
No. 14 Florida	2	–	3	–	1	6	–	4	–	1
Georgia Tech	2	–	3	–	1	5	–	4	–	1
Georgia	2	–	4	–	0	4	–	6	–	0
Tulane	1	–	5	–	0	3	–	7	–	0
Mississippi State	1	–	6	–	0	3	–	6	–	0
$ – Conference champion; Ole Miss's game against Houston counted in the conference standings.; Rankings from AP Poll

The 1958 Mississippi State Maroons football team were an American football team that represented Mississippi State University in the Southeastern Conference (SEC) during the 1958 college football season. In their third year under head coach Wade Walker, the team had a 3–6 record (1–6 in conference play), finishing 12th in the SEC.

== Schedule ==
Date	Opponent	Rank	Site	Result	Attendance	Source
September 27	at No. 18 Florida	No. 11	Florida Field; Gainesville, FL	W 14–7	31,102	
October 4	vs. Tennessee	No. 11	Crump Stadium; Memphis, TN	L 8–13	27,279	
October 11	No. T–20 (small) Memphis State*		Scott Field; Starkville, MS	W 28–6	12,000	
October 18	Arkansas State*		Scott Field; Starkville, MS	W 38–0	12,000	
October 25	Alabama	No. 19	Scott Field; Starkville, MS (rivalry)	L 7–9	26,000	
November 1	at Kentucky		McLean Stadium; Lexington, KY	L 12–33	27,000	
November 8	at No. 5 Auburn		Cliff Hare Stadium; Auburn, AL	L 14–33	36,000	
November 15	No. 1 LSU		Mississippi Veterans Memorial Stadium; Jackson, MS (rivalry)	L 6–7	26,000	
November 29	at No. 13 Ole Miss		Hemingway Stadium; Oxford, MS (Egg Bowl)	L 0–21	33,500	
*Non-conference game; Rankings from AP Poll released prior to the game
