= 1958 Kentucky Wildcats football team =

American college football season

1958 Kentucky Wildcats football
- Conference: Southeastern Conference
- Record: 5–4–1 (3–4–1 SEC)
- Head coach: Blanton Collier (5th season)
- Home stadium: McLean Stadium

1958 Southeastern Conference football standings
	Conf.					Overall
Team	W		L		T	W		L		T
No. 1 LSU $	6	–	0	–	0	11	–	0	–	0
No. 4 Auburn	6	–	0	–	1	9	–	0	–	1
No. 11 Ole Miss	4	–	2	–	0	9	–	2	–	0
Vanderbilt	2	–	1	–	3	5	–	2	–	3
Tennessee	4	–	3	–	0	4	–	6	–	0
Alabama	3	–	4	–	1	5	–	4	–	1
Kentucky	3	–	4	–	1	5	–	4	–	1
No. 14 Florida	2	–	3	–	1	6	–	4	–	1
Georgia Tech	2	–	3	–	1	5	–	4	–	1
Georgia	2	–	4	–	0	4	–	6	–	0
Tulane	1	–	5	–	0	3	–	7	–	0
Mississippi State	1	–	6	–	0	3	–	6	–	0
$ – Conference champion; Ole Miss's game against Houston counted in the conference standings.; Rankings from AP Poll

The 1958 Kentucky Wildcats football team represented the University of Kentucky as a member of the Southeastern Conference (SEC) during the 1958 college football season. Led by fifth-year head coach Blanton Collier, the Wildcats compiled an overall record of 5–4–1 with a mark of 3–4–1 in conference play, placing tied for sixth in the SEC.

== Season ==
Kentucky opened with a 51–0 win over Hawaii at Fairgrounds Stadium in Louisville. A 13–0 win in the SEC opener against Georgia Tech followed. 2–0 Kentucky, then ranked #17 in the AP poll, then lost four games in a row: 27–6 to #9 Ole Miss in Memphis, 8–0 to #1 Auburn, 32–7 at #9 LSU and 28–0 at Georgia. A 33–12 win over Mississippi State was followed by a 0–0 tie against Vanderbilt. After a 20–6 win against Xavier, Kentucky closed the season with a 6–2 victory at Tennessee.

The victory over Tennessee was Kentucky's second in a row, and second in a stretch of four games in which Kentucky denied Tennessee a win. The Wildcats were invited to participate in the 1958 Bluegrass Bowl but declined due to what they considered to be poor treatment during their season opener, a win against Hawaii in the stadium in which the Bluegrass Bowl would be played. Florida State and Oklahoma State played in the 1958 Bluegrass Bowl instead.

== Schedule ==
Date	Opponent	Rank	Site	Result	Attendance	Source
September 13	vs. Hawaii*		Fairgrounds Stadium; Louisville, KY	W 51–0	16,000	
September 20	Georgia Tech		McLean Stadium; Lexington, KY	W 13–0	30,000	
September 27	at No. 9 Ole Miss	No. 17	Crump Stadium; Memphis, TN	L 6–27	26,626	
October 11	No. 1 Auburn		McLean Stadium; Lexington, KY	L 0–8	36,000	
October 18	at No. 9 LSU		Tiger Stadium; Baton Rouge, LA	L 7–32	65,000	
October 25	at Georgia		Sanford Stadium; Athens, GA	L 0–28	31,000	
November 1	Mississippi State		McLean Stadium; Lexington, KY	W 33–12	27,000	
November 8	Vanderbilt		McLean Stadium; Lexington, KY (rivalry)	T 0–0	28,000	
November 15	Xavier*		McLean Stadium; Lexington, KY	W 20–6	25,000	
November 22	at Tennessee		Shields–Watkins Field; Knoxville, TN (rivalry)	W 6–2	41,600	
*Non-conference game; Rankings from AP Poll released prior to the game

Schedule source:

== Team players in the 1959 NFL draft ==
Player	Position	Round	Pick	NFL club
Jim Bowie	Tackle	22	254	Philadelphia Eagles
