= 1958 Vanderbilt Commodores football team =

American college football season

1958 Vanderbilt Commodores football
- Conference: Southeastern Conference
- Record: 5–2–3 (2–1–3 SEC)
- Head coach: Art Guepe (6th season)
- Home stadium: Dudley Field

1958 Southeastern Conference football standings
	Conf.					Overall
Team	W		L		T	W		L		T
No. 1 LSU $	6	–	0	–	0	11	–	0	–	0
No. 4 Auburn	6	–	0	–	1	9	–	0	–	1
No. 11 Ole Miss	4	–	2	–	0	9	–	2	–	0
Vanderbilt	2	–	1	–	3	5	–	2	–	3
Tennessee	4	–	3	–	0	4	–	6	–	0
Alabama	3	–	4	–	1	5	–	4	–	1
Kentucky	3	–	4	–	1	5	–	4	–	1
No. 14 Florida	2	–	3	–	1	6	–	4	–	1
Georgia Tech	2	–	3	–	1	5	–	4	–	1
Georgia	2	–	4	–	0	4	–	6	–	0
Tulane	1	–	5	–	0	3	–	7	–	0
Mississippi State	1	–	6	–	0	3	–	6	–	0
$ – Conference champion; Ole Miss's game against Houston counted in the conference standings.; Rankings from AP Poll

The 1958 Vanderbilt Commodores football team represented Vanderbilt University in the 1958 college football season. The Commodores were led by head coach Art Guepe in his sixth season and finished the season with a record of five wins, two losses and three ties (5–2–3 overall, 2–1–3 in the SEC).

== Schedule ==
Date	Opponent	Rank	Site	Result	Attendance	Source
September 20	at Missouri*		Memorial Field; Columbia, MO	W 12–8	24,000	
September 27	Georgia		Dudley Field; Nashville, TN (rivalry)	W 21–14	24,000	
October 5	at Alabama	No. 20	Legion Field; Birmingham, AL	T 0–0	36,000	
October 11	No. 8 Clemson*		Dudley Field; Nashville, TN	L 7–12	26,000	
October 18	at No. 18 Florida		Florida Field; Gainesville, FL	T 6–6	40,105	
October 25	Virginia*		Dudley Field; Nashville, TN	W 39–6	21,000	
October 31	at Miami (FL)*		Burdine Stadium; Miami, FL	W 28–15	25,400	
November 8	at Kentucky		McLean Stadium; Lexington, KY (rivalry)	T 0–0	28,000	
November 15	Tulane		Dudley Field; Nashville, TN	W 12–0	23,500	
November 29	Tennessee	No. 15	Dudley Field; Nashville, TN (rivalry)	L 6–10	27,967	
*Non-conference game; Rankings from AP Poll released prior to the game
