= 1958 Ole Miss Rebels football team =

American college football season

1958 Ole Miss Rebels football

Gator Bowl champion

Gator Bowl, W 7–3 vs. Florida
- Conference: Southeastern Conference

Ranking
- Coaches: No. 12
- AP: No. 11
- Record: 9–2 (4–2 SEC)
- Head coach: Johnny Vaught (12th season)
- Captains: Milton Crain; Kent Lovelace
- Home stadium: Hemingway Stadium; Crump Stadium

1958 Southeastern Conference football standings
	Conf.					Overall
Team	W		L		T	W		L		T
No. 1 LSU $	6	–	0	–	0	11	–	0	–	0
No. 4 Auburn	6	–	0	–	1	9	–	0	–	1
No. 11 Ole Miss	4	–	2	–	0	9	–	2	–	0
Vanderbilt	2	–	1	–	3	5	–	2	–	3
Tennessee	4	–	3	–	0	4	–	6	–	0
Alabama	3	–	4	–	1	5	–	4	–	1
Kentucky	3	–	4	–	1	5	–	4	–	1
No. 14 Florida	2	–	3	–	1	6	–	4	–	1
Georgia Tech	2	–	3	–	1	5	–	4	–	1
Georgia	2	–	4	–	0	4	–	6	–	0
Tulane	1	–	5	–	0	3	–	7	–	0
Mississippi State	1	–	6	–	0	3	–	6	–	0
$ – Conference champion; Ole Miss's game against Houston counted in the conference standings.; Rankings from AP Poll

The 1958 Ole Miss Rebels football team represented the University of Mississippi as a member of the Southeastern Conference (SEC) during the 1958 college football season. Led by 12th-year head coach Johnny Vaught, the Rebels compiled an overall record of 9–2 with a mark of 4–2 in conference play, placing third in the SEC. Ole Miss was ranked 11th in the final AP poll, conducted at the end of the regular season. The Rebels were invited to the 1958 Gator Bowl, where they defeated fellow SEC member Florida, 7–3. The team played most of their home games at Hemingway Stadium in Oxford, Mississippi, with the game vs. Kentucky at Crump Stadium in Memphis.

== Schedule ==
Date	Opponent	Rank	Site	Result	Attendance	Source
September 20	at Memphis State*	No. 6	Crump Stadium; Memphis, TN (rivalry)	W 17–0	11,392	
September 27	vs. No. 17 Kentucky	No. 9	Crump Stadium; Memphis, TN	W 27–6	26,626	
October 4	at Trinity (TX)*	No. 6	Alamo Stadium; San Antonio, TX	W 21–0	6,511	
October 11	at Tulane	No. 7	Tulane Stadium; New Orleans, LA (rivalry)	W 19–8		
October 18	Hardin–Simmons*	No. 8	Hemingway Stadium; Oxford, MS	W 24–0	18,500	
October 25	at Arkansas*	No. 6	War Memorial Stadium; Little Rock, AR (rivalry)	W 14–12	36,000	
November 1	at No. 1 LSU	No. 6	Tiger Stadium; Baton Rouge, LA (rivalry)	L 0–14	68,000	
November 8	Houston (Note: Ole Miss's game against Houston counted in the SEC standings.)^{†}	No. 9	Hemingway Stadium; Oxford, MS	W 56–7	20,000	
November 15	at Tennessee	No. 7	Shields–Watkins Field; Knoxville, TN (rivalry)	L 16–18	27,100	
November 29	Mississippi State	No. 13	Hemingway Stadium; Oxford, MS (Egg Bowl)	W 21–0	33,500	
December 27	vs. No. 14 Florida*	No. 11	Gator Bowl Stadium; Jacksonville, FL (Gator Bowl)	W 7–3	40,000	
*Non-conference game; ^{†}Homecoming; Rankings from AP Poll released prior to the game

== Roster ==
- DB Billy Brewer
