= 1959 Sugar Bowl =

American college football game

- 25th Sugar Bowl
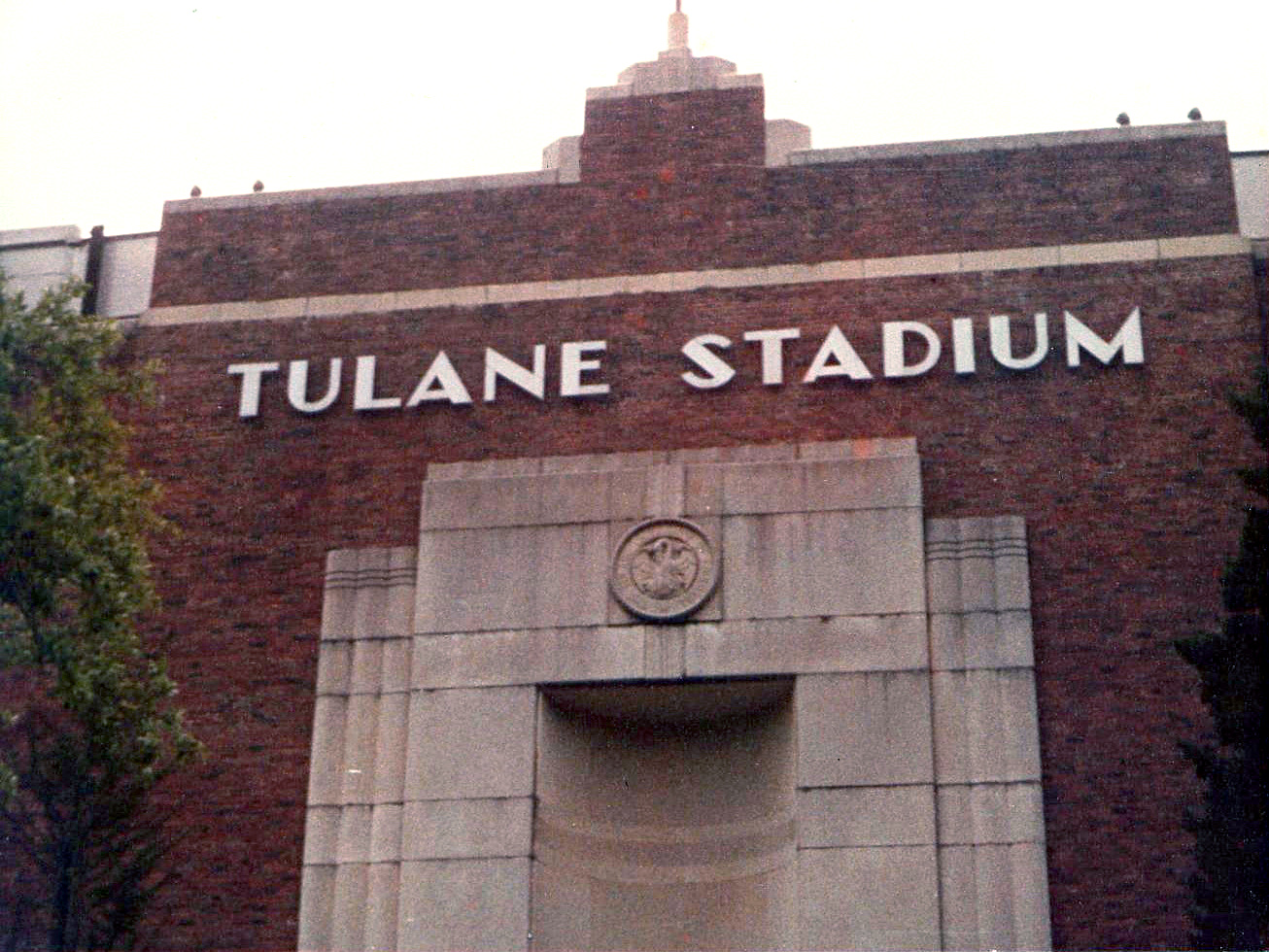
- Tulane Stadium in New Orleans, Louisiana, hosted the Sugar Bowl.
Clemson Tigers	LSU Tigers
(8–2)	(10–0)
ACC	SEC
0	7
Head coach: Frank Howard	Head coach: Paul Dietzel
AP / Coaches; 12 / 13	AP / Coaches; 1 / 1
	1	2	3	4	Total
Clemson	0	0	0	0	0
LSU	0	0	7	0	7
- Date: January 1, 1959
- Season: 1958
- Stadium: Tulane Stadium
- Location: New Orleans, Louisiana
- MVP: Billy Cannon, LSU
- Favorite: LSU by 15 points
- Referee: John J. Lynch (SEC) (split crew between SEC & ACC)

United States TV coverage
- Network: NBC

The 1959 Sugar Bowl featured the top-ranked LSU Tigers and the 12th-ranked Clemson Tigers. LSU had already secured the consensus national title, as the final editions of both major polls were released a month earlier in early December. Also, 37 other selectors selected LSU as National Champions. With Heisman Trophy winner Billy Cannon at halfback, LSU was favored to win by fifteen points.

Coincidentally, LSU clinched the national championship on the same field Nov. 22, scoring 56 second half points to swamp Tulane 62–0.

The game's only score came in the late third quarter, when Cannon threw a 9-yard touchdown pass to Mickey Mangham for a 7–0 lead. LSU had recovered a poor snap from punt formation deep in Clemson territory to set up the score. LSU quarterback Warren Rabb broke his hand on the third play of the game, but it was not discovered until late in the second quarter.

LSU's defense shut out Clemson and Cannon was named Sugar Bowl MVP.

LSU's shutout victory over #12 Clemson was convincing and highlighted LSU as the only team in the country to go undefeated. Army, Auburn, and Air Force did not lose all season but they each had one game that ended in a tie. LSU's total first place votes was 130 to win the 1958 National Championship in the AP poll. LSU received 29 of the 35 first-place votes to win the #1 ranking in the Coaches poll. LSU earned the #1 rankings in the AP and Coaches poll during week 6 and held on to the #1 rankings for the rest of the year to win the 1958 National Championship in both major polls. LSU also was awarded the national championship by 37 other selectors.

== Aftermath ==
Cannon won the Heisman Trophy in 1959. One week after Cannon's 89-yard punt return for a touchdown allowed the Bayou Bengals to defeat Ole Miss, LSU's bid to repeat as national champion died when Cannon was stopped on a two-point conversion in a 14–13 loss at Tennessee. LSU and Ole Miss staged a rematch in the Sugar Bowl, with the Rebels prevailing 21–0 in a game which was not as close as the final.

LSU and Clemson did not meet again until the 1996 Peach Bowl, with the Bayou Bengals winning 10–7. Clemson exacted revenge in the same bowl sixteen years later, winning 25–24 on a Chandler Catanzaro field goal as time expired.

Clemson did not return to the Sugar Bowl until the 2017 season, where it lost 24–6 to Alabama in a college football playoff semifinal. The 2020 Tigers went back to the Sugar Bowl and lost 49–28 to Ohio State in another playoff semifinal.

Clemson and LSU next met in New Orleans in the 2020 College Football Playoff National Championship, with Heisman Trophy winner Joe Burrow leading LSU to a 42–25 victory for its fourth national championship, completing a 15–0 season and denying Clemson a repeat championship. The Tigers won the CFP in the 2016 and 2018 seasons.

LSU is 6–7 in the Sugar Bowl. It has not appeared in the game since the 2006 season, when it defeated Notre Dame 41–14 in the 2007 edition, its third victory in six seasons in the classic. However, LSU has played in three national championship games (two BCS, one CFP) in New Orleans since that Sugar Bowl.
