= 1958 Auburn Tigers football team =

American college football season

1958 Auburn Tigers football

National Champion (Montgomery Full Season Championship)
- Conference: Southeastern Conference

Ranking
- Coaches: No. 4
- AP: No. 4
- Record: 9–0–1 (6–0–1 SEC)
- Head coach: Ralph Jordan (8th season)
- Home stadium: Cliff Hare Stadium

1958 Southeastern Conference football standings
	Conf.					Overall
Team	W		L		T	W		L		T
No. 1 LSU $	6	–	0	–	0	11	–	0	–	0
No. 4 Auburn	6	–	0	–	1	9	–	0	–	1
No. 11 Ole Miss	4	–	2	–	0	9	–	2	–	0
Vanderbilt	2	–	1	–	3	5	–	2	–	3
Tennessee	4	–	3	–	0	4	–	6	–	0
Alabama	3	–	4	–	1	5	–	4	–	1
Kentucky	3	–	4	–	1	5	–	4	–	1
No. 14 Florida	2	–	3	–	1	6	–	4	–	1
Georgia Tech	2	–	3	–	1	5	–	4	–	1
Georgia	2	–	4	–	0	4	–	6	–	0
Tulane	1	–	5	–	0	3	–	7	–	0
Mississippi State	1	–	6	–	0	3	–	6	–	0
$ – Conference champion; Ole Miss's game against Houston counted in the conference standings.; Rankings from AP Poll

The 1958 Auburn Tigers football team represented Auburn University in the 1958 college football season. It was the Tigers' 67th overall and 26th season as a member of the Southeastern Conference (SEC). The team was led by head coach Ralph "Shug" Jordan, in his eighth year, and played their home games at Cliff Hare Stadium in Auburn and Legion Field in Birmingham, Alabama. They finished with a record of nine wins, zero losses and one tie (9–0–1 overall, 6–0–1 in the SEC). On August 19, 2025, Auburn University formally recognized the 1958 football team as national champions, based on the Montgomery Full Season Championship rankings.

== Schedule ==
Date	Opponent	Rank	Site	TV	Result	Attendance	Source
September 27	Tennessee	No. 3	Legion Field; Birmingham, AL	NBC	W 13–0	46,000	
October 4	No. 4 (small) Chattanooga*	No. 2	Cliff Hare Stadium; Auburn, AL		W 30–8	20,000	
October 11	at Kentucky	No. 1	McLean Stadium; Lexington, KY		W 8–0	36,000	
October 18	at Georgia Tech	No. 2	Grant Field; Atlanta, GA (rivalry)		T 7–7	44,726	
October 25	Maryland*	No. 5	Cliff Hare Stadium; Auburn, AL		W 20–7	28,000	
November 1	at Florida	No. 4	Florida Field; Gainesville, FL (rivalry)		W 6–5	36,474	
November 8	Mississippi State^{†}	No. 5	Cliff Hare Stadium; Auburn, AL		W 33–14	36,000	
November 15	vs. Georgia	No. 4	Memorial Stadium; Columbus, GA (rivalry)		W 21–6	28,000	
November 22	Wake Forest*	No. 2	Cliff Hare Stadium; Auburn, AL		W 21–7	20,000	
November 29	vs. Alabama	No. 2	Legion Field; Birmingham, AL (Iron Bowl)		W 14–8	44,000	
*Non-conference game; ^{†}Homecoming; Rankings from AP Poll released prior to the game
