= J. W. Brodnax =

American football player (1936–2006)

No. 36, 31
- Position: Fullback

Personal information
- Born: March 6, 1936; Bastrop, Louisiana, U.S.
- Died: January 6, 2006 (aged 69); Morgan City, Louisiana, U.S.
- Listed height: 6 ft 0 in (1.83 m)
- Listed weight: 208 lb (94 kg)

Career information
- High school: Bastrop
- College: LSU
- NFL draft: 1959: 15th round, 175th overall pick

Career history
- Pittsburgh Steelers (1959)*; Denver Broncos (1960)
- * Offseason or practice squad member only

Awards and highlights
- National champion (1958); Nils V. "Swede" Nelson Award (1958); Jacobs Blocking Trophy (1958)

Career AFL statistics
- Rushing yards: 18
- Rushing average: 1.2
- Receptions: 5
- Receiving yards: 39
- Total touchdowns: 1
- Stats at Pro Football Reference

John Willis "Red" Brodnax Jr. (March 6, 1936 – January 6, 2006) was an American football player. Brodnax played college football for the LSU Tigers and played professionally for both the Pittsburgh Steelers of the National Football League (NFL) and Denver Broncos of the American Football League (AFL).

Brodnax was a member of coach Paul Dietzel's 1958 national championship team. He was the starting fullback on the "White Team" of Dietzel's three-platoon system, in the backfield with Warren Rabb and Billy Cannon. Brodnax was awarded the Jacobs Blocking Trophy as the best blocker in the Southeastern Conference. He was also awarded the Nils V. "Swede" Nelson Award for "the strength of his unselfish sacrifice of personal achievement to aid his team to an unbeaten record and a Sugar Bowl berth against Clemson."

Brodnax's lone score as a professional was a short touchdown reception from quarterback Frank Tripucka with the Broncos in 1960 against the Buffalo Bills.
