= 1958 Florida Gators football team =

American college football season

1958 Florida Gators football

Gator Bowl, L 3–7 vs. Ole Miss
- Conference: Southeastern Conference

Ranking
- Coaches: No. 15
- AP: No. 14
- Record: 6–4–1 (2–3–1 SEC)
- Head coach: Bob Woodruff (9th season)
- Home stadium: Florida Field

1958 Southeastern Conference football standings
	Conf.					Overall
Team	W		L		T	W		L		T
No. 1 LSU $	6	–	0	–	0	11	–	0	–	0
No. 4 Auburn	6	–	0	–	1	9	–	0	–	1
No. 11 Ole Miss	4	–	2	–	0	9	–	2	–	0
Vanderbilt	2	–	1	–	3	5	–	2	–	3
Tennessee	4	–	3	–	0	4	–	6	–	0
Alabama	3	–	4	–	1	5	–	4	–	1
Kentucky	3	–	4	–	1	5	–	4	–	1
No. 14 Florida	2	–	3	–	1	6	–	4	–	1
Georgia Tech	2	–	3	–	1	5	–	4	–	1
Georgia	2	–	4	–	0	4	–	6	–	0
Tulane	1	–	5	–	0	3	–	7	–	0
Mississippi State	1	–	6	–	0	3	–	6	–	0
$ – Conference champion; Ole Miss's game against Houston counted in the conference standings.; Rankings from AP Poll

The 1958 Florida Gators football team represented the University of Florida during the 1958 college football season. The season was the ninth of ten for Bob Woodruff as the head coach of the Florida Gators football team. Woodruff's 1958 Florida Gators finished with an overall record of 6–4–1 and a Southeastern Conference (SEC) record of 2–3–1, placing eighth in the twelve-member SEC.

== Schedule ==
Date	Opponent	Rank	Site	Result	Attendance	Source
September 20	Tulane		Florida Field; Gainesville, FL	W 34–14	26,641	
September 27	No. 11 Mississippi State	No. 18	Florida Field; Gainesville, FL	L 7–14	31,102	
October 10	at UCLA*		Los Angeles Memorial Coliseum; Los Angeles, CA	W 21–14	31,175	
October 18	Vanderbilt^{†}	No. 18	Florida Field; Gainesville, FL	T 6–6	40,105	
October 25	at No. 3 LSU		Tiger Stadium; Baton Rouge, LA (rivalry)	L 7–10	62,000	
November 1	No. 4 Auburn		Florida Field; Gainesville, FL (rivalry)	L 5–6	36,474	
November 8	vs. Georgia	No. 19	Gator Bowl Stadium; Jacksonville, FL (rivalry)	W 7–6	38,234	
November 15	Arkansas State*	No. 18	Florida Field; Gainesville, FL	W 51–7	19,030	
November 22	Florida State*	No. 12	Florida Field; Gainesville, FL (rivalry)	W 21–7	44,403	
November 29	vs. Miami (FL)*	No. 14	Gator Bowl Stadium; Jacksonville, FL (rivalry)	W 12–9	24,000–24,641	
December 27	vs. No. 11 Ole Miss*	No. 14	Gator Bowl Stadium; Jacksonville, FL (Gator Bowl)	L 3–7	41,312	
*Non-conference game; ^{†}Homecoming; Rankings from AP Poll released prior to the game

== Before the season ==
The prospects for the 1958 season were devastated by Bernie Parrish deciding to play baseball with the Cincinnati Reds. The Gators were led by quarterback Jimmy Dunn, defensive back Don Fleming, halfback and punter Bobby Joe Green and All-American tackle Vel Heckman.

== Game summaries ==
=== Tulane ===
The season opened with a 34–14 a conference win over the Tulane Green Wave

=== Mississippi State ===
The first disappointment of the season came in the second week, when the Gators lost, 14–7, to the 11-ranked Mississippi State Bulldogs.

=== UCLA ===
In the third week of play, Florida had an intersectional victory over the UCLA Bruins team, 21–14, on the road in Los Angeles.

=== Vanderbilt ===
Florida tied Vanderbilt, 6–6.

=== LSU ===
Florida–LSU

Team	1	2	3	4	Total
Florida	0	0	0	7	7
• No. 3 LSU	0	7	0	3	10

- Date: October 25
- Location: Tiger Stadium
  Baton Rouge, Louisiana
- Game attendance: 62,000

The Gators lost to the eventual consensus national champion LSU Tigers at the latter's homecoming. The Tigers snapped a three-game losing streak to the Gators with a 10–7 defensive struggle that came down to the last three minutes of play. The game featured one of the strongest rushing teams in the nation against one of the league's best run defenses. The Tigers, led by halfbacks Billy Cannon and Johnny Robinson, averaged 220 yards rushing per game. The Gators had held their previous opponents to an average of 65 yards rushing per game. LSU was favored by two touchdowns. Bill Kastelz, the sports editor of the Jacksonville Times-Union, wrote that Heckman's play reached All-American levels against No. 3-ranked LSU on October 25, 1958.

=== Auburn ===
In a 5–6 loss to fourth-ranked Auburn, an injury to a Florida tackles led Woodruff to employ the unorthodox strategy of shifting Heckman between right and left tackle. Bill Kastelz, the sports editor of the Jacksonville Times-Union, wrote: "Big, fast and tough, he outshone all of Auburn's great linemen." According to Auburn coach Shug Jordan, "There should be a law to prevent things like that. We were supposed to run plays where Heckman wasn't, and he's there now."

Coach Bob Woodruff's Gators and coach Shug Jordan's Tigers played nine games against each other between 1951 and 1959, only three of which were decided by more than ten points. However, none was closer than the game between the unranked Gators and the defending national champions and fourth-ranked Tigers in 1958, a game in which neither team scored more than six points. Late in the fourth quarter, with the Tigers leading 6–3 on the strength of a single touchdown and a missed extra point, the stingy Gators defense pinned the Tigers offense behind their own three-yard-line. Rather than risk a turnover, Jordan ordered Tigers quarterback Johnny Kern to kneel in their own end zone, intentionally scoring a safety for the Gators, but earning a free punt for the Tigers. The Tigers kicked it away, and their defense held on to win 6–5.

=== Georgia ===
The Gators beat the rival Georgia Bulldogs, 7–6.

=== Arkansas State ===
Florida beat Arkansas State, 51–7.

=== Florida State ===
Team	1	2	3	4	Total
Florida State	7	0	0	0	7
• Florida	7	14	0	0	21

- Date: November 22
- Location: Florida Field, Gainesville, Florida
- Game attendance: 43,000

Scoring summary
1	11:42	FSU	Fred Pickard 1 yard run (Johnny Sheppard kick)	FSU 7-0
1	6:59	FLA	recovered blocked punt in end zone (kick good)	Tie 7-7
2	3:38	FLA	Jimmy Dunn 9 yard run (kick good)	FLA 14-7
2	0:57	FLA	Jimmy Dunn 12 yard run (kick good)	FLA 21-7

The Gators had a 21–7 victory in their meeting wit the new in-state rival Florida State Seminoles.

=== Miami (FL) ===
The season included a 12–9 upset of the Miami Hurricanes.

=== Ole Miss—Gator Bowl ===
The Gators capped the year with a season-ending 3–7 loss to the 11th-ranked Ole Miss Rebels in a defensive struggle in the December 1958 Gator Bowl in Jacksonville, Florida.

== Roster ==
- QB Jimmy Dunn, Sr.
