= Bobby Joe Green =

American football player and coach (1936–1993)

No. 89, 88
- Position: Punter

Personal information
- Born: May 7, 1936; Vernon, Texas, U.S.
- Died: May 28, 1993 (aged 57); Gainesville, Florida, U.S.
- Listed height: 5 ft 11 in (1.80 m)
- Listed weight: 175 lb (79 kg)

Career information
- High school: College (Bartlesville, Oklahoma)
- College: Oklahoma (1955–1956); Florida (1957–1959)
- NFL draft: 1959: 9th round, 102nd overall pick
- AFL draft: 1960

Career history

Playing
- Pittsburgh Steelers (1960–1961); Chicago Bears (1962–1973)

Coaching
- Florida (1979–1989) Kickers coach

Awards and highlights
- NFL champion (1963); Pro Bowl (1970); 2× NFL punting yards leader (1960, 1966); 100 greatest Bears of All-Time; National champion (1956); University of Florida Athletic Hall of Fame

Career NFL statistics
- Punts: 970
- Punting yards: 41,317
- Punting average: 42.6
- Longest punt: 74
- Stats at Pro Football Reference

Bobby Joe Green (May 7, 1936 – May 28, 1993) was an American professional football player who was a punter for 14 seasons in the National Football League (NFL) with the Pittsburgh Steelers and the Chicago Bears. He played college football for the Florida Gators.

== Early life ==
Green was born in Vernon, Texas, in 1936. He attended College High School in Bartlesville, Oklahoma, and he played high school football for the College High Wildcats.

== College career ==
Green accepted an athletic scholarship to attend the University of Florida in Gainesville, Florida, where he was a punter and halfback for coach Bob Woodruff's Gators teams from 1958 and 1959. As a senior in 1959, he kicked fifty-four punts for an average distance of 44.9 yards—still the Gators' single-season record. Woodruff ranked him and Don Chandler as the Gators' best kickers of the 1950s. His 82-yard punt against the Georgia Bulldogs in 1958 remains the longest punt by a Gator in the modern era. Green was also a sprinter and high jumper on the Florida Gators track and field team. He was later inducted into the University of Florida Athletic Hall of Fame as a "Gator Great."

Green also appeared on Oklahoma's 1956 National Championship roster.

== Professional career ==
Green was selected in the ninth round (102nd pick overall) of the 1959 NFL draft by the San Francisco 49ers, and played fourteen seasons for the Pittsburgh Steelers and the Chicago Bears. He played for the Steelers in 1960 and 1961, and then was traded to the Bears, for whom he played from 1962 to 1973. Green was a member of the Bears' 1963 NFL Championship team, and was selected to the Pro Bowl after the 1970 season. Green was one of the last NFL players to play without a face mask and can be seen doing so in the late 1960s.

During his fourteen-season NFL career, Green appeared in 187 games, kicking 970 punts for 41,317 yards (an average of 42.6 yards per kick). He also completed six of ten passing attempts for 103 yards.

== Life after the NFL ==
Green returned to Gainesville, Florida after his professional football career ended, and started a specialty advertising business. Green also served as a volunteer kicking coach for the Florida Gators under head football coaches Charley Pell and Galen Hall from 1979 to 1989. In May 2019 Green was rated #97 on the Chicago Bears top 100 list.

Green died as a result of a heart attack in his Gainesville home on the morning of May 28, 1993; he was 57 years old. He was survived by his wife Martha Jane and their son and daughter.

== See also ==
- Florida Gators football, 1950–59
- List of Chicago Bears players
- List of Florida Gators in the NFL draft
- List of Pittsburgh Steelers players
- List of University of Florida alumni
- List of University of Florida Athletic Hall of Fame members
