= Mickey Mangham =

American football player (1939–2010)

- Mangham's game winning catch in 1959 Sugar Bowl

No. 86
- Position: End

Personal information
- Born: August 25, 1939
- Died: September 16, 2010 (aged 71); Lafayette, Louisiana, U.S.
- Listed height: 6 ft 1 in (1.85 m)
- Listed weight: 190 lb (86 kg)

Career information
- College: LSU (1958–1960)

Awards and highlights
- National champion (1958); Second-team All-SEC (1959)

Michael Ray Mangham (August 25, 1939 – September 16, 2010) was an American football player for the LSU Tigers from 1958 to 1960. He played at the end position on both offense and defense and was selected as an Academic All-America and All-SEC player. He is most remembered for catching the winning touchdown pass in the Sugar Bowl on January 1, 1959, to give LSU the national championship for the 1958 college football season.

== Football star at LSU ==
Mangham came to LSU from Kensington, Maryland. His mother was the former Louise Ratliff (1913–2005). His father, Francis Ray "Fanny" Mangham (1911–1981), had played basketball and football for Louisiana Tech University in Ruston. He enrolled without an athletic scholarship and played as a walk-on for the freshman football team in 1957. When LSU's head coach Paul Dietzel asked the freshman coach how the freshman ends were doing, he was told, "Not so good, but this Mangham is looking good." Dietzel heard the story so often that he put Mangham on scholarship.

In 1958, Coach Dietzel played Mangham, then a 6-foot, 1-inch, 190-pound sophomore, in the first two games of the season against Rice and Alabama. Mangham played so well he became a starter. He helped lead the 1958 LSU Tigers football team to a perfect 12–0 record and the national championship. He scored LSU's only touchdown on a nine-yard pass from College Football Hall of Famer Billy Cannon in its 7-0 win over Clemson in the 1959 Sugar Bowl.

As a junior, Mangham was a starter for the 1959 LSU Tigers football team that compiled a 9–2 record, finished the season ranked third in the AP and Coaches' poll, and lost to Ole Miss, 21-0, in the 1960 Sugar Bowl. At the conclusion of the 1959 season, Mangham was selected by a vote of the nation's sports writers to the 1959 first-team Academic All-America team. He was a three-year starter for LSU, playing on both defense and offense. At the start of the 1960 season, one Louisiana newspaper profiled Mangham as follows:

During the past two seasons, Mangham, a 6'1", 202-pound senior from Kensington, Maryland, has been one of the Tigers' top defensive players, and enters the 1960 campaign with all-star recommendations. He was a pre-season All-Southeastern Conference selection, and has the size, speed and experience to live up to that billing.

Mangham concluded his college football career playing in two post-season all-star games. He played for the South in the 1960 Blue–Gray Football Classic in Montgomery, Alabama. Mangham scored the only touchdown of the game for the South on a 16-yard touchdown pass from future All-Pro quarterback, Norm Snead.

The following week, Mangham played for the East team in the 1961 Hula Bowl in Honolulu, Hawaii. Mangham was injured early in the game, and Pittsburgh end Mike Ditka was required to play in his place.

In September 1961, Coach Dietzel praised Mangham. Dietzel noted that Mangham had "played every down on defense for us the last two years," and said that replacing him was one of his "toughest problems" for the 1961 season.

== Later life ==
Mangham graduated in 1962 from LSU with a degree in petroleum engineering. In 1966, he procured a law degree from LSU Law School. He served as chairman of LSU's Tiger Athletic Foundation during the 1990s. He worked as an oil-and-gas attorney in the Acadiana region of Louisiana until his death.

On September 16, 2010, Mangham died of a heart attack at his home in Lafayette.

He was married to the former Melinda Waller. His daughter was Elizabeth. Services were held on September 18 at the Episcopal Church of the Ascension in Lafayette.
