= Nat Dye =

American gridiron football player

Profile
- Position: Defensive end

Personal information
- Born: June 10, 1937; Blythe, Georgia
- Died: March 19, 2024 (aged 86); Blythe, Georgia
- Listed height: 6 ft 3 in (1.91 m)
- Listed weight: 220 lb (100 kg)

Career information
- College: Georgia

Career history
- 1959–1964: Edmonton Eskimos
- 1964–1965: Saskatchewan Roughriders

Awards and highlights
- Second-team All-SEC (1958)

Nathaniel Slaughter Dye, Sr. (June 10, 1937 – March 19, 2024) was an American professional football player who played for the Edmonton Eskimos and Saskatchewan Roughriders. He played college football at the University of Georgia. He is the brother of Pat Dye.
