= 1958 Tulane Green Wave football team =

American college football season

1958 Tulane Green Wave football
- Conference: Southeastern Conference
- Record: 3–7 (1–5 SEC)
- Head coach: Andy Pilney (5th season)
- Home stadium: Tulane Stadium

1958 Southeastern Conference football standings
	Conf.					Overall
Team	W		L		T	W		L		T
No. 1 LSU $	6	–	0	–	0	11	–	0	–	0
No. 4 Auburn	6	–	0	–	1	9	–	0	–	1
No. 11 Ole Miss	4	–	2	–	0	9	–	2	–	0
Vanderbilt	2	–	1	–	3	5	–	2	–	3
Tennessee	4	–	3	–	0	4	–	6	–	0
Alabama	3	–	4	–	1	5	–	4	–	1
Kentucky	3	–	4	–	1	5	–	4	–	1
No. 14 Florida	2	–	3	–	1	6	–	4	–	1
Georgia Tech	2	–	3	–	1	5	–	4	–	1
Georgia	2	–	4	–	0	4	–	6	–	0
Tulane	1	–	5	–	0	3	–	7	–	0
Mississippi State	1	–	6	–	0	3	–	6	–	0
$ – Conference champion; Ole Miss's game against Houston counted in the conference standings.; Rankings from AP Poll

The 1958 Tulane Green Wave football team was an American football team that represented Tulane University during the 1958 college football season as a member of the Southeastern Conference (SEC). In its fifth year under head coach Andy Pilney, Tulane compiled a 3–7 record (1–5 in conference games), finished in 11th place in the SEC, and was outscored by a total of 189 to 105.

Tulane defeated Alabama, playing its first season under coach Bear Bryant, a victory that remains the Green Wave's last against the Crimson Tide.

The team gained an average of 110.7 rushing yards and 115.5 passing yards per game. On defense, it gave up an average of 185.7 rushing yards and 87.8 passing yards per game. Tulane's individual leaders included Richie Petitbon with 728 passing yards, Percy Colon with 288 rushing yards, and Pete Abadie with 266 receiving yards.

The Green Wave played its home games at Tulane Stadium in New Orleans.

== Schedule ==
Date	Opponent	Site	Result	Attendance	Source
September 20	at Florida	Florida Field; Gainesville, FL	L 14–34	26,641	
September 26	Texas*	Tulane Stadium; New Orleans, LA	L 20–21	35,000	
October 4	at Georgia Tech	Grant Field; Atlanta, GA	L 0–14	38,000	
October 11	No. 7 Ole Miss	Tulane Stadium; New Orleans, LA (rivalry)	L 8–19		
October 18	vs. No. 6 Navy*	Foreman Field; Norfolk, VA (Oyster Bowl)	W 14–6	32,000–32,169	
October 25	at Kansas*	Memorial Stadium; Lawrence, KS	L 9–14	17,000–20,000	
October 31	Texas Tech*	Tulane Stadium; New Orleans, LA	W 27–0	27,000	
November 7	Alabama	Tulane Stadium; New Orleans, LA	W 13–7	34,000	
November 15	at Vanderbilt	Dudley Field; Nashville, TN	L 0–12	23,500	
November 22	No. 1 LSU	Tulane Stadium; New Orleans, LA (Battle for the Rag)	L 0–62	83,221	
*Non-conference game; Rankings from AP Poll released prior to the game
