= 1958 Tennessee Volunteers football team =

American college football season

1958 Tennessee Volunteers football
- Conference: Southeastern Conference
- Record: 4–6 (4–3 SEC)
- Head coach: Bowden Wyatt (4th season)
- Home stadium: Shields–Watkins Field

1958 Southeastern Conference football standings
| | Conf. | | | | | Overall |
| Team | W | | L | | T | W | | L | | T |
|---|---|---|---|---|---|---|---|---|---|---|
| No. 1 LSU $ | 6 | – | 0 | – | 0 | 11 | – | 0 | – | 0 |
| No. 4 Auburn | 6 | – | 0 | – | 1 | 9 | – | 0 | – | 1 |
| No. 11 Ole Miss | 4 | – | 2 | – | 0 | 9 | – | 2 | – | 0 |
| Vanderbilt | 2 | – | 1 | – | 3 | 5 | – | 2 | – | 3 |
| Tennessee | 4 | – | 3 | – | 0 | 4 | – | 6 | – | 0 |
| Alabama | 3 | – | 4 | – | 1 | 5 | – | 4 | – | 1 |
| Kentucky | 3 | – | 4 | – | 1 | 5 | – | 4 | – | 1 |
| No. 14 Florida | 2 | – | 3 | – | 1 | 6 | – | 4 | – | 1 |
| Georgia Tech | 2 | – | 3 | – | 1 | 5 | – | 4 | – | 1 |
| Georgia | 2 | – | 4 | – | 0 | 4 | – | 6 | – | 0 |
| Tulane | 1 | – | 5 | – | 0 | 3 | – | 7 | – | 0 |
| Mississippi State | 1 | – | 6 | – | 0 | 3 | – | 6 | – | 0 |
$ – Conference champion; Ole Miss's game against Houston counted in the conference standings.; Rankings from AP Poll

The 1958 Tennessee Volunteers (variously Tennessee, UT, or the Vols) represented the University of Tennessee in the 1958 college football season. Playing as a member of the Southeastern Conference (SEC), the team was led by head coach Bowden Wyatt, in his fourth year, and played their home games at Shields–Watkins Field in Knoxville, Tennessee. They finished the season with a record of four wins and six losses (4–6 overall, 4–3 in the SEC).

== Schedule ==
| Date | Opponent | Site | TV | Result | Attendance | Source |
|---|---|---|---|---|---|---|
| September 27 | at No. 3 Auburn | Legion Field; Birmingham, AL (rivalry) | NBC | L 0–13 | 46,000 | |
| October 4 | vs. No. 11 Mississippi State | Crump Stadium; Memphis, TN | | W 13–8 | 27,279 | |
| October 11 | at Georgia Tech | Grant Field; Atlanta, GA (rivalry) | | L 7–21 | 44,726 | |
| October 18 | Alabama | Shields–Watkins Field; Knoxville, TN (Third Saturday in October) | | W 14–7 | 34,200 | |
| October 25 | Florida State* | Shields–Watkins Field; Knoxville, TN | | L 0–10 | 23,700 | |
| November 1 | No. 17 North Carolina* | Shields–Watkins Field; Knoxville, TN | | L 7–21 | 25,290 | |
| November 8 | No. 11 (small) Chattanooga* | Shields–Watkins Field; Knoxville, TN | | L 6–14 | | |
| November 15 | No. 7 Ole Miss^{†} | Shields–Watkins Field; Knoxville, TN (rivalry) | | W 18–16 | 27,100 | |
| November 22 | Kentucky | Shields–Watkins Field; Knoxville, TN (rivalry) | | L 2–6 | 41,600 | |
| November 29 | at No. 15 Vanderbilt | Dudley Field; Nashville, TN (rivalry) | | W 10–6 | 27,967 | |
*Non-conference game; ^{†}Homecoming; Rankings from AP Poll released prior to the game

== Roster ==
- TB Bill Majors, So.

== Team players drafted into the NFL ==
| Player | Position | Round | Pick | NFL club |
|---|---|---|---|---|
| Carl Smith | Back | 9 | 101 | Detroit Lions |
| Lebron Shields | Tackle | 22 | 256 | Detroit Lions |
