= 1958 Georgia Bulldogs football team =

American college football season

1958 Georgia Bulldogs football
- Conference: Southeastern Conference
- Record: 4–6 (2–4 SEC)
- Head coach: Wally Butts (20th season)
- Home stadium: Sanford Stadium

1958 Southeastern Conference football standings
	Conf.					Overall
Team	W		L		T	W		L		T
No. 1 LSU $	6	–	0	–	0	11	–	0	–	0
No. 4 Auburn	6	–	0	–	1	9	–	0	–	1
No. 11 Ole Miss	4	–	2	–	0	9	–	2	–	0
Vanderbilt	2	–	1	–	3	5	–	2	–	3
Tennessee	4	–	3	–	0	4	–	6	–	0
Alabama	3	–	4	–	1	5	–	4	–	1
Kentucky	3	–	4	–	1	5	–	4	–	1
No. 14 Florida	2	–	3	–	1	6	–	4	–	1
Georgia Tech	2	–	3	–	1	5	–	4	–	1
Georgia	2	–	4	–	0	4	–	6	–	0
Tulane	1	–	5	–	0	3	–	7	–	0
Mississippi State	1	–	6	–	0	3	–	6	–	0
$ – Conference champion; Ole Miss's game against Houston counted in the conference standings.; Rankings from AP Poll

The 1958 Georgia Bulldogs football team represented the University of Georgia as a member of the Southeastern Conference (SEC) during the 1958 college football season. Led by 20th-year head coach Wally Butts, the Bulldogs compiled an overall record of 4–6 with a mark of 2–4 in conference play, and placed 10th in the SEC.

== Schedule ==
Date	Opponent	Site	Result	Attendance	Source
September 20	at No. 11 Texas*	Memorial Stadium; Austin, TX	L 8–13	32,000	
September 27	at Vanderbilt	Dudley Field; Nashville, TN (rivalry)	L 14–21	24,000	
October 4	South Carolina*	Sanford Stadium; Athens, GA (rivalry)	L 14–24	28,000	
October 11	vs. Florida State*	Gator Bowl Stadium; Jacksonville, FL	W 28–13	16,023	
October 25	Kentucky^{†}	Sanford Stadium; Athens, GA	W 28–0	31,000	
November 1	at Alabama	Denny Stadium; Tuscaloosa, AL (rivalry)	L 0–12	28,500	
November 8	vs. No. 19 Florida	Gator Bowl Stadium; Jacksonville, FL (rivalry)	L 6–7	38,234	
November 15	vs. No. 4 Auburn	Memorial Stadium; Columbus, GA (rivalry)	L 6–21	28,000	
November 22	The Citadel*	Sanford Stadium; Athens, GA	W 76–0	26,000	
November 29	Georgia Tech	Sanford Stadium; Athens, GA (rivalry)	W 16–3	50,000	
*Non-conference game; ^{†}Homecoming; Rankings from AP Poll released prior to the game

== Roster ==
- Fran Tarkenton, So.
