= 1958 Gator Bowl =

American college football game

Florida Gators	Ole Miss Rebels
(6–3–1)	(8–2)
SEC	SEC
3	7
Head coach: Bob Woodruff	Head coach: Johnny Vaught
AP / Coaches; 14 / 15	AP / Coaches; 11 / 12
	1	2	3	4	Total
Florida	3	0	0	0	3
Ole Miss	7	0	0	0	7
- Date: December 27, 1958
- Season: 1958
- Stadium: Gator Bowl Stadium
- Location: Jacksonville, Florida
- MVP: QB Bobby Franklin, Ole Miss; End Dave Hudson, Florida
- Referee: E.D. Cavette (SEC)
- Attendance: 41,312

United States TV coverage
- Network: CBS

The 1958 Gator Bowl was a college football postseason bowl game between the Florida Gators and the Ole Miss Rebels.

== Background ==
The Gators finished eighth in the Southeastern Conference (SEC), with four teams above them having fewer overall wins. This was their first Gator Bowl since the 1953 game. The Rebels finished third in the SEC, earning an invitation to their second straight bowl game and first Gator Bowl.

== Game summary ==
The first two drives turned out to be the only scores in the game. On the opening kickoff, the Rebels returned the ball 80 yards, which set up Jim Anderson's 1-yard touchdown run to give Ole Miss a 7–0 lead. On the ensuing kickoff, the Gators drove into the Rebels' territory, scoring on a 27-yard field goal by Billy Booker. There was 7:44 remaining in the first quarter, but for the rest of the game, there were no more points, with Florida and Ole Miss combining for six turnovers. The Gators had two chances late in the game, both in the fourth quarter. The Gators recovered a fumble after a quick kick at the Ole Miss 10. On 4th-and-2, the Rebels stuffed Florida to get the ball back. After a punt, the Gators had the ball at the Rebels 26. They managed to drive the ball to the 15, but Bill Churchwell caused a fumble, recovering the ball for Ole Miss. Later in the contest, Jimmy Dunn fumbled a punt return at the 48 of the Gators, with the Rebels recovering with 3:10 remaining. The Rebels held onto the ball for the rest of the game, winning their second straight bowl game.

== Aftermath ==
The Gators reached the Gator Bowl two years later. The Rebels went to the Sugar Bowl the next two years, winning both times to claim a share of the national championship.

== Statistics ==
Statistics	Florida	Ole Miss
First downs	12	9
Rushing yards	157	155
Passing yards	58	27
Total offense	215	182
Passing (C–A–I)	5–11–1	2–7–0
Punts–average	7–44.1	10–34.4
Fumbles–lost	5–3	5–2
Penalties–yards	3–25	2–10
