= 1958 Navy Midshipmen football team =

American college football season

1958 Navy Midshipmen football
- Conference: Independent
- Record: 6–3
- Head coach: Eddie Erdelatz (9th season)
- Captain: Dick Dagampat
- Home stadium: Thompson Stadium

1958 Southern major college football independents records
	Conf.			Overall
Team	W	L	T	W		L		T
No. 19 Oklahoma State		–		8	–	3	–	0
Florida State		–		7	–	4	–	0
Navy		–		6	–	3	–	0
Texas Tech		–		3	–	7	–	0
Miami (FL)		–		2	–	8	–	0
Rankings from AP poll

The 1958 Navy Midshipmen football team represented the United States Naval Academy (USNA) as an independent during the 1958 college football season. They began the season ranked 7th in the pre-season AP Poll. The team was led by ninth-year head coach Eddie Erdelatz.

== Schedule ==
Date	Time	Opponent	Rank	Site	TV	Result	Attendance	Source
September 27		William & Mary^{†}	No. 12	Thompson Stadium; Annapolis, MD		W 14–0	12,000	
October 4		at Boston University	No. 15	Nickerson Field; Boston, MA		W 28–14	20,000	
October 11		at No. 14 Michigan	No. 12	Michigan Stadium; Ann Arbor, MI		W 20–14	82,220	
October 18		vs. Tulane	No. 6	Foreman Field; Norfolk, VA (Oyster Bowl)		L 6–14	32,000–32,169	
October 25		at Penn	No. 18	Franklin Field; Philadelphia, PA		W 50–8	18,914	
November 1		Notre Dame	No. 15	Memorial Stadium; Baltimore, MD (rivalry)		L 20–40	57,773	
November 8		vs. Maryland		Memorial Stadium; Baltimore, MD (rivalry)		W 40–14	30,035	
November 15		at George Washington		Griffith Stadium; Washington, DC		W 28–8	12,000–14,500	
November 29	1:15 p.m.	vs. No. 5 Army		Philadelphia Municipal Stadium; Philadelphia, PA (Army–Navy Game)	NBC	L 6–22	102,000	
^{†}Homecoming; Rankings from AP Poll released prior to the game; All times are in Eastern time; Source:
