= Don Fleming (American football) =

American football player (1937–1963)

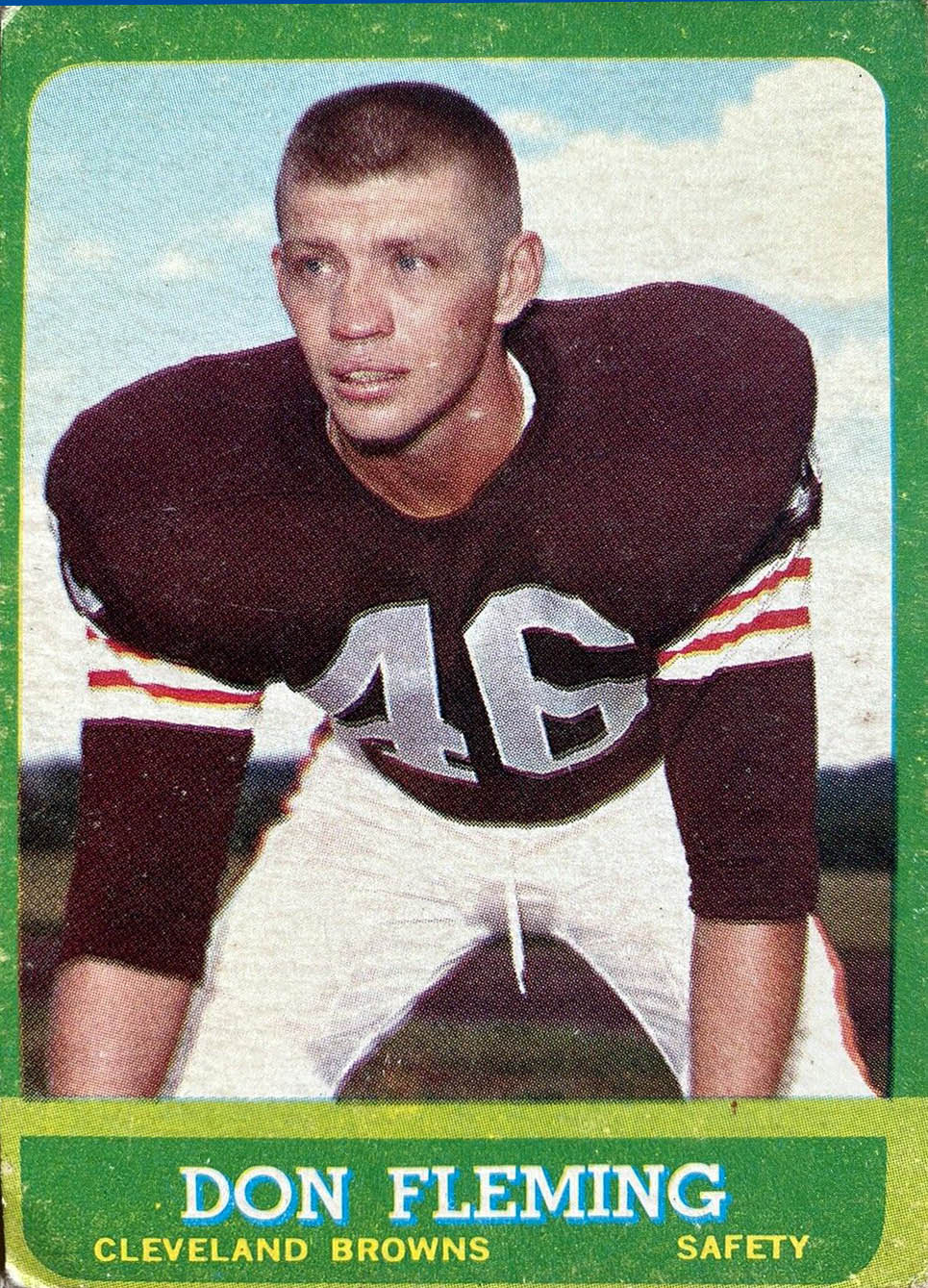
- Fleming on a 1963 Topps card

No. 46
- Position: Safety

Personal information
- Born: June 11, 1937; Bellaire, Ohio, U.S.
- Died: June 4, 1963 (aged 25); Winter Park, Florida, U.S.
- Listed height: 6 ft 0 in (1.83 m)
- Listed weight: 188 lb (85 kg)

Career information
- High school: Shadyside (Shadyside, Ohio)
- College: Florida
- NFL draft: 1959: 28th round, 327th overall pick

Career history
- Cleveland Browns (1960–1962)

Awards and highlights
- Cleveland Browns No. 46 retired; First-team All-SEC (1958); University of Florida Athletic Hall of Fame

Career NFL statistics
- Interceptions: 10
- Interception yards: 160
- Fumble recoveries: 4
- Stats at Pro Football Reference

Donald Denver Fleming (June 11, 1937 – June 4, 1963) was an American professional football player who was a safety for three seasons during the early 1960s with the Cleveland Browns of the National Football League (NFL). Fleming played college football for the Florida Gators, and thereafter, he played professionally for the Cleveland Browns of the NFL. His career was cut short by his accidental death by electrocution in 1963.

== Early life ==
Fleming was born in Bellaire, Ohio, in 1937 to Denver Fleming. He attended Shadyside High School in Shadyside, Ohio, where he was a standout prep player for the Shadyside Tigers high school football team.

== College career ==
Fleming attended the University of Florida in Gainesville, Florida, where he played for coach Bob Woodruff's Florida Gators football team from 1956 to 1958. Fleming was the Gators' team captain in 1958, and he finished his college football career as a first-team All-Southeastern Conference (SEC) selection. Woodruff ranked him as the Gators' best receiver of the 1950s.

Fleming catching a touchdown pass at Florida.

The Chicago Cardinals drafted Fleming following his senior football season, but he chose to remain in school and exhaust his remaining NCAA baseball eligibility playing for coach Dave Fuller's Florida Gators baseball team from 1958 to 1960. He was the captain of the Gators baseball team, and led the Gators in home runs and stolen bases.

== Professional career ==
Fleming was selected by the Chicago Cardinals in the 28th round (327th pick overall) of the 1959 NFL draft, but he remained at the University of Florida and did not play during the 1959 NFL season. He successfully urged Chicago management to trade him to the Cleveland Browns before the start of the 1960 season. Fleming was a close friend of another Browns defensive back, Bernie Parrish, a fellow Florida graduate, and the two were said to be almost inseparable during the NFL season. Over the following three years, Fleming played regularly at safety, intercepted ten passes, recovered four fumbles, and made The Sporting News All-NFL team in 1962.

== Death and legacy ==
Fleming, his wife Rosalie and their son Ty lived in his hometown of Shadyside, Ohio, during football season, and in Winter Park, Florida, during the NFL off-season. As a 25-year-old NFL All-Conference selection, Fleming was already planning for when his professional football career ended. He had majored in building construction at the University of Florida, and had been working as a foreman for a Central Florida construction company during the off-season to stay in shape and gain industry experience. On June 4, 1963, Fleming and a co-worker, Walter Smith, were operating a crane on a construction site west of Orlando, Florida, when the boom of the crane brushed an overhead 12,000-volt high-tension electrical transmission line. Fleming and Smith were electrocuted, and attempts to revive them at the hospital failed.

Earlier the same day, the Browns had announced that Fleming had signed his contract for the 1963 season. His death came only 17 days after that of Ernie Davis, the overall No. 1 pick in the 1962 NFL draft, whom the Browns had acquired in a trade. The Browns retired both Davis' uniform number No. 45 and Fleming's No. 46 in memory of the players. Fleming Field at Shadyside High School, Fleming's alma mater, is named in his memory. When the Browns practiced at Western Reserve Eclectic Institute (Hiram College), the field house they used also carried Fleming's name.

Fleming was nominated for the Florida Sports Hall of Fame within days of his death, and he was later inducted into the University of Florida Athletic Hall of Fame as a "Gator Great."

== See also ==
- History of the Cleveland Browns
- List of Florida Gators in the NFL draft
- List of University of Florida alumni
- List of University of Florida Athletic Hall of Fame members
- List of gridiron football players who died during their careers
