= 1958 Florida State Seminoles football team =

American college football season

1958 Florida State Seminoles football

Bluegrass Bowl, L 6–15 vs. Oklahoma State
- Conference: Independent
- Record: 7–4
- Head coach: Tom Nugent (6th season)
- Captains: Vic Prinzi; Bobby Renn
- Home stadium: Doak Campbell Stadium

1958 Southern major college football independents records
	Conf.			Overall
Team	W	L	T	W		L		T
No. 19 Oklahoma State		–		8	–	3	–	0
Florida State		–		7	–	4	–	0
Navy		–		6	–	3	–	0
Texas Tech		–		3	–	7	–	0
Miami (FL)		–		2	–	8	–	0
Rankings from AP poll

The 1958 Florida State Seminoles football team represented Florida State University as an independent during the 1958 college football season. Led by Tom Nugent in his sixth and final season as head coach, the Seminole compiled a record of 7–4. Florida State was invited to the Bluegrass Bowl, where the Seminoles lost to Oklahoma State. 1958 was the beginning of the longstanding rivalry with the Florida Gators. The Gators won the first meeting by a score of 21–7. This season also marked the first time the Seminoles defeated the Miami Hurricanes.

== Schedule ==
Date	Opponent	Site	Result	Attendance	Source
September 13	Tennessee Tech	Doak Campbell Stadium; Tallahassee, FL	W 22–7	18,200	
September 20	Furman	Doak Campbell Stadium; Tallahassee, FL	W 42–6	14,800	
September 26	at Georgia Tech	Grant Field; Atlanta, GA	L 3–17	40,391	
October 4	Wake Forest	Doak Campbell Stadium; Tallahassee, FL	W 27–24	19,700	
October 11	vs. Georgia	Gator Bowl Stadium; Jacksonville, FL	L 13–28	16,023	
October 18	VPI	Doak Campbell Stadium; Tallahassee, FL	W 28–0	8,000	
October 25	at Tennessee	Shields–Watkins Field; Knoxville, TN	W 10–0	23,700	
November 1	Tampa	Doak Campbell Stadium; Tallahassee, FL	W 43–0	17,083	
November 7	at Miami (FL)	Burdine Stadium; Miami, FL (rivalry)	W 17–6	31,879	
November 22	at No. 12 Florida	Florida Field; Gainesville, FL (rivalry)	L 7–21	44,403	
December 13	vs. No. 19 Oklahoma State	Fairgrounds Stadium; Louisville, KY (Bluegrass Bowl)	L 6–15	7,000	
Rankings from AP Poll released prior to the game

== Roster ==
- QB Joe Majors, Jr.
