= Richie Petitbon =

American football player and coach (born 1938)

No. 17, 16
- Position: Safety

Personal information
- Born: April 18, 1938 (age 88); New Orleans, Louisiana, U.S.
- Listed height: 6 ft 3 in (1.91 m)
- Listed weight: 206 lb (93 kg)

Career information
- High school: Jesuit (New Orleans)
- College: Loyola (LA); Tulane (1957–1958)
- NFL draft: 1959: 2nd round, 21st overall pick

Career history

Playing
- Chicago Bears (1959–1968); Los Angeles Rams (1969–1970); Washington Redskins (1971–1972)

Coaching
- Houston Oilers (1973–1977) Assistant coach; Washington Redskins (1978–1980) Defensive backs coach; Washington Redskins (1981–1992) Defensive coordinator; Washington Redskins (1993) Head coach

Awards and highlights
- As a player: NFL champion (1963); First-team All-Pro (1963); 2× Second-team All-Pro (1962, 1967); 4× Pro Bowl (1962, 1963, 1966, 1967); 100 greatest Bears of All-Time; First-team All-SEC (1958); As a coach: 3× Super Bowl champion (XVII, XXII, XXVI); Washington Commanders 90 Greatest; Washington Commanders Ring of Fame

Career NFL statistics
- Interceptions: 48
- Interception yards: 801
- Fumble recoveries: 13
- Defensive touchdowns: 3
- Stats at Pro Football Reference

Head coaching record
- Career: 4–12 (.250)
- Coaching profile at Pro Football Reference

Richard Alvin Petitbon (born April 18, 1938) is an American former professional football player and coach in the National Football League (NFL). Petitbon first attended Loyola University New Orleans on a track and field scholarship and left after his freshman year to play college football for the Tulane Green Wave.

After playing as a quarterback at Tulane, he played as a safety for the Chicago Bears from 1959 to 1968, Los Angeles Rams in 1969 and 1970, and Washington Redskins in 1971 and 1972. Petitbon recorded the second most interceptions in Bears history with 37 during his career, trailing Gary Fencik.

Petitbon also holds the Bears' record for the longest interception return, after scoring on a 101-yard return against the Rams in 1962. As of 2019, he also holds the Bears record for the most interceptions in a game—3 against the Green Bay Packers in 1967—and most interception return yards in a season (212 in 1962).

== Early life ==
Petitbon was born in New Orleans on April 18, 1938 to a French immigrant father and American mother. He attended Jesuit High School in New Orleans, where he played on the football team as quarterback and on defense, winning a state championship. In a 1954 game against archrival Holy Cross, Petitbon threw an 88-yard touchdown pass to Billy Ladner, the longest completion in school history.

Petitbon's Jesuit High record stood for 66 years until it was broken in 2020, on an 89-yard pass from Luke LaForge to Max Milano. The new record was broken the following year, on a 96-yard pass from Jack Larriviere to Jace Larsen, in the 101st meeting between Jesuit High and Holy Cross for the Golden Football.

== College career ==
Petitbon had run the 100-yard dash in 9.7 seconds in high school, and initially went to Loyola University in New Orleans on a track scholarship, in 1957. After his freshman year, Petitbon transferred to Tulane University, where he became the Green Wave's quarterback under coach Andy Pilney. In 1958, Petitbon was named All-Southeastern Conference quarterback. In 20 games, his completion percentage was 47.3, with five passing touchdowns, five running touchdowns, thirteen interceptions, and 336 rushing yards. He also averaged 27.6 yards per kickoff return that year, second best in school history. His Tulane career average of 24.3 yards per kick return set a school record, which has since been surpassed.

== NFL playing career ==
=== Chicago Bears ===
Petitbon was drafted by the Bears in the second round of the 1959 draft, the 21st player taken overall. In his first year, he played cornerback, with three interceptions and one touchdown return on an interception. In 1960, Hall of Fame coach George Halas switched Petitbon to safety, where he would play the next 13 years. One of his defensive coordinators with the Bears was future Hall of Fame coach George Allen. Petitbon also played under defensive coordinator Clark Shaughnessy with the Bears, whom Petitbon considered a genius.

In 1962, he returned an interception against the Los Angeles Rams 101 yards for a touchdown, the longest return in Bears' history. He had six interceptions that year, and a league leading 212 return yards on interceptions. The Associated Press (AP) named him second-team All-Pro.

In 1963, Petitbon had eight interceptions. In the 1963 NFL championship game, Petitbon intercepted Y. A. Tittle's last second pass into the endzone, securing a 14-10 victory for the Bears as NFL champions. He had recovered a fumble earlier in the game. He was named first-team All-Pro that season by the AP and United Press International (UPI).

In 1966, The Sporting News named him first team All-Conference at strong safety. In 1967, he was again selected to the Pro Bowl. In the Pro Bowl game, played in January 1968, Petitbon intercepted a Fran Tarkenton pass, and returned it 70 yards for a touchdown, then a Pro Bowl record. Petitbon was named second-team All-Pro by the AP, UPI and Newspaper Enterprise Association (NEA). He played 10 years total with the Bears. His 38 interceptions with the Bears ranks second in team history. He also had three interceptions in a single game against the Green Bay Packers in 1967.

Petitbon announced his possible retirement in July 1968 because of a need to attend to business in New Orleans, and desire to play only for the New Orleans Saints, but Halas and the Saints could not reach an agreement to trade Petitbon. He came back to play that season for the Bears.

During his time with the Bears, he had captained the team and called defensive signals.

=== Rams, Redskins and George Allen ===
After 1968, Petitbon played out his option with the Bears. He wanted to join Allen in 1969, who was the Los Angeles Rams head coach. Petitbon had great respect for Allen as the architect of the Bears 1963 championship defense, and for how Allen treated his players. Halas unsuccessfully had tried to stop Allen from going to the Rams, and tried to stop Petitbon from joining Allen there as well. Petitbon threatened a lawsuit to test the scope of free agency under NFL contracts, and the Bears traded him to the Rams for player Lee Calland and two draft choices.

George Allen traded for Petitbon again two years later when he became head coach in Washington. He was the ninth former Ram Allen brought to Washington. In his first game with Washington in 1971, against the St. Louis Cardinals, Petitbon had three interceptions. Washington reached the Super Bowl in 1972, losing to the Miami Dolphins 14-7, in the year the Dolphin's were a perfect 17-0. Petitbon retired at the end of the year.

=== Career ===
In his career, Petitbon had 48 interceptions, recovered 13 fumbles, and scored three defensive touchdowns. He appeared in four Pro Bowls during his time with the Bears, and was first-team All-Pro in 1963.

== Coaching career ==
Petitbon was an assistant coach with the Houston Oilers for four years. He returned to the Redskins in 1978 as the defensive backs coach under Jack Pardee. In 1981, future Hall of Fame coach Joe Gibbs became head coach, and he made Petitbon defensive coordinator. From 1981 to 1992, Petitbon was the Redskins' defensive coordinator and/or assistant head coach/defense under Gibbs, either acting as coordinator alone or sharing the job with Larry Peccatiello. Washington linebacker Matt Millen, who would go on to be a network broadcaster and president of the Detroit Lions, observed that an excellent coach like Petitbon can determine a defense's success as much as the talent of the team's personnel.

During this time period, Petitbon was considered one of the top defensive minds and innovators in football. He led Washington's defense while Gibbs led the offense. During his tenure in Washington, the team won Super Bowls XVII, XXII, and XXVI. Petitbon and Peccatiello created a blitz scheme on the day of Super Bowl XXVI that led to an interception later in the day on the first play of the second half.

In 1982, the Redskins had the first-ranked defense, allowing only 14.2 points per game. In 1983, his team forced 61 turnovers. In the Redskins's 1991 Super Bowl-winning season, the defense allowed the second fewest points of any defense in the NFL, holding opponents to 14 points or less 10 times.

When Gibbs initially retired in 1993, Petitbon was named his successor. He did not find the same success as a head coach, lasting only one season. Aging and underachieving, the team finished 4–12 and Petibon was dismissed by Redskins owner Jack Kent Cooke in favor of archrival Dallas Cowboys offensive coordinator Norv Turner. Following his firing, Petitbon never took another job in the NFL.

== Personal life and family ==
Petitbon's older brother, John Petitbon, also attended Jesuit High School and led it to the Louisiana AA football championship in 1946. John attended Notre Dame for college, and played in the NFL. His NFL career was interrupted by his service as a marine in Korea, winning an NFL championship in 1955 with the Cleveland Browns after his return from the war.

Petitbon's son, Richie Petitbon Jr., played football for the University of Maryland Terrapins in the 1980s, and Petitbon Jr.'s son, Carson Petitbon, played quarterback at St. Mary's High School in Annapolis, Maryland, his home town. He is a current player for the Terrapins. Carson's brother, Richie Petitbon III played offensive line at the University of Alabama and the University of Illinois, and his other brother Luke was an offensive lineman at Wake Forest University and Florida State University.

After the NFL, Richie Petitbon joined his son's Alarm Company called "Petitbon Alarm Company."

== Honors ==
In 1969, Petitbon was selected by the Louisiana Sports Writers Association at quarterback, along with Y.A. Tittle, to the all-time Louisiana collegiate football team, based on Petitbon's 1955 season with Tulane. Both Petitbon brothers are members of the Louisiana Sports Hall of Fame, the Greater New Orleans Sports Hall of Fame, and the Louisiana High School Sports Hall of Fame. Richie was inducted into the Tulane Athletic Hall of Fame in 1980. He was inducted into Washington's Ring of Fame in 2015.

As of October 17, 2024, Petitbon was among 12 candidates selected for possible induction to the Pro Football Hall of Fame Class of 2025, as a coach. He was not among those selected for the class of 2025.

== Head coaching record ==
Team	Year	Regular season					Postseason			
Team	Year	Won	Lost	Ties	Win %	Finish	Won	Lost	Win %	Result
WAS	1993	4	12	0	.250	5th in NFC East	–	–	–	–
