= Warren Rabb =

American gridiron football player (born 1937)

No. 18, 17, 31
- Position: Quarterback

Personal information
- Born: December 12, 1937 (age 88); Baton Rouge, Louisiana, U.S.
- Listed height: 6 ft 3 in (1.91 m)
- Listed weight: 204 lb (93 kg)

Career information
- High school: Baton Rouge
- College: LSU
- NFL draft: 1960: 2nd round, 15th overall pick
- AFL draft: 1960: 2nd round

Career history
- Detroit Lions (1960); Buffalo Bills (1961-1962); Montreal Alouettes (1963)

Awards and highlights
- National champion (1958); First-team All-SEC (1958); Second-team All-SEC (1959)

Career NFL/AFL statistics
- Passing attempts: 251
- Passing completions: 101
- Completion percentage: 40.2%
- TD–INT: 15–16
- Passing yards: 1,782
- Passer rating: 58.6
- Stats at Pro Football Reference

Samuel Warren Rabb (born December 12, 1937) is an American former professional football player who was a quarterback for the Detroit Lions of the National Football League (NFL) and the Buffalo Bills of the American Football League (AFL). He played college football for the LSU Tigers and was selected in the second round of the 1960 NFL draft. He completed his professional career with the Montreal Alouettes of the Canadian Football League (CFL) in 1963.

He was the quarterback of the national championship winning 1958 LSU Tigers football team. He was named to the 1958 All-SEC football team by the Associated Press.

== See also ==
- List of American Football League players
