= 1958–59 NCAA football bowl games =

College football postseason game series

- Season: 1958
- Number of bowls: 8
- All-star games: Blue–Gray Football Classic; East–West Shrine Game; North–South Shrine Game; Senior Bowl
- Bowl games: December 13, 1958 – January 1, 1959 (Note: Excludes all-star games.)
- Champions: Iowa Hawkeyes (FWAA); LSU Tigers (AP, Coaches)
Bowl record by conference
Conference	Bowls	Record	Number of teams in final AP poll
Independents	4	1–2–1 (0.375)	5
SEC	3	2–1 (0.667)	4
Big Ten	1	1–0 (1.000)	4
Big Seven	1	1–0 (1.000)	1
Lone Star	1	1–0 (1.000)	0
Mountain States	1	1–0 (1.000)	0
SWC	1	0–0–1 (0.500)	2
ACC	1	0–1 (0.000)	2
PCC	1	0–1 (0.000)	1
MCAU	1	0–1 (0.000)	0
Border	1	0–1 (0.000)	0
Middle Atlantic	0	0–0 (–)	1

The 1958–59 NCAA football bowl games were a series of post-season games played in December 1958 and January 1959 to end the 1958 college football season. A total of eight team-competitive games, and four all-star games, were played. The post-season began with the Bluegrass Bowl on December 13, 1958, and concluded on January 3, 1959, with the season-ending Senior Bowl all-star game.

== Schedule ==
The following table lists bowl games involving University Division teams; (Note: Teams in this seasons's Tangerine Bowl were not from the University Division, but the bowl is included due to its history with such teams.) bowl games at lower levels are listed in the See also section.

The eight team-competitive bowls consisted of the seven played the prior season plus the first (and only) edition of the Bluegrass Bowl.

Notably, Tangerine Bowl organizers initially invited the University at Buffalo, hoping that the Orlando High School Athletic Association (OHSAA), which operated the Tangerine Bowl stadium, would waive its rule that prohibited integrated sporting events. When it refused, the team unanimously voted to skip the bowl because its two black players (halfback Willie Evans and end Mike Wilson) would not have been allowed on the field.

Date	Game	Site	Time (US EST)	TV	Matchup (pre-game record)	AP pre-game rank	UPI (Coaches) pre-game rank
12/13	Bluegrass Bowl	Cardinal Stadium; Louisville, Kentucky	2:00 p.m.	ABC	Oklahoma State 15 (7–3) (Independent), Florida State 6 (7–3) (Independent)	#19; NR	NR; NR
12/27	Tangerine Bowl	Tangerine Bowl (stadium); Orlando, Florida	2:30 p.m.	—	East Texas State 26 (9–1) (Lone Star), Missouri Valley 7 (8–0) (MCAU)	n/a	n/a
12/27	Gator Bowl	Gator Bowl Stadium; Jacksonville, Florida	2:00 p.m.	CBS	Ole Miss 7 (8–2) (SEC), Florida 3 (6–3–1) (SEC)	#11 #14	#12 #15
12/31	Sun Bowl	Kidd Field; El Paso, Texas	4:00 p.m.	—	Wyoming 14 (7–3) (Mountain States), Hardin–Simmons 6 (6–4) (Border†)	NR; NR	NR; NR
1/1	Orange Bowl	Burdine Stadium; Miami, Florida	1:00 p.m.	CBS	Oklahoma 21 (9–1) (Big Seven†), Syracuse 6 (8–1) (Independent)	#5 #9	#5 #10
1/1	Sugar Bowl	Tulane Stadium; New Orleans, Louisiana	2:00 p.m.	NBC	LSU 7 (10–0) (SEC†), Clemson 0 (8–2) (ACC†)	#1 #12	#1 #13
1/1	Cotton Bowl Classic	Cotton Bowl; Dallas, Texas	3:30 p.m.	CBS	TCU 0 (8–2) (SWC†), Air Force 0 (9–0–1) (Independent)	#10 #6	#9 #8
1/1	Rose Bowl	Rose Bowl; Pasadena, California	5:00 p.m.	NBC	Iowa 38 (7–1–1) (Big Ten†), California 12 (7–3) (PCC†)	#2 #16	#2 #16

† denotes conference champion

== See also ==
- Holiday Bowl (NAIA)
- Prairie View Bowl
