= UCLA Bruins coaches =

UCLA Bruins coaches may refer to:

- List of UCLA Bruins football head coaches
- List of UCLA Bruins men's basketball head coaches

== See also ==
- Category:UCLA Bruins coaches
