= List of UCLA Bruins head football coaches =

The UCLA Bruins college football team represents University of California, Los Angeles (UCLA) in the Big Ten Conference (Big Ten). The Bruins compete as part of the NCAA Division I Football Bowl Subdivision. The program has had 20 head coaches and five interim head coaches since it began play during the 1919 season. From November 2017 to February 2024, Chip Kelly served as head coach of the Bruins. Since December 2025, Bob Chesney has served as the head coach at UCLA.

Terry Donahue is the leader in both total wins and seasons coached with 151 wins during his 20 year tenure as head coach of the program. Red Sanders has the highest winning percentage at 0.773. Harry Trotter has the lowest winning percentage of those who have coached more than one game, with 0.156. Of the 19 different head coaches who have led the Bruins, Edwin C. Horrell, Sanders, Tommy Prothro, and Donahue have been inducted into the College Football Hall of Fame.

== Key ==
Key to symbols in coaches list
| General | | Overall | | Conference | | Postseason (Note: Although the first Rose Bowl Game was played in 1902, it has been continuously played since the 1916 game, and is recognized as the oldest bowl game by the NCAA. "—" indicates any season prior to 1916 when postseason games were not played.) | |
|---|---|---|---|---|---|---|---|
| No. | Order of coaches (Note: A running total of the number of head coaches, with coaches who served separate tenures being counted only once. Interim head coaches are represented with "Int" and are not counted in the running total. "—" indicates the team played but either without a coach or no coach is on record. "X" indicates an interim year without play.) | GC | Games coached | CW | Conference wins | PW | Postseason wins |
| DC | Division championships | OW | Overall wins | CL | Conference losses | PL | Postseason losses |
| CC | Conference championships | OL | Overall losses | CT | Conference ties | PT | Postseason ties |
| NC | National championships | OT | Overall ties (Note: Overtime rules in college football were introduced in 1996, making ties impossible in the period since.) | C% | Conference winning percentage | | |
| † | Elected to the College Football Hall of Fame | O% | Overall winning percentage (Note: When computing the win–loss percentage, a tie counts as half a win and half a loss.) | | | | |

== Coaches ==
List of head football coaches showing season(s) coached, overall records, conference records, postseason records, championships and selected awards (Note: Statistics correct as of the end of the 2025 NCAA Division I FBS football season.)
| No. | Name | Season(s) | GC | OW | OL | OT | O% | CW | CL | CT | C% | PW | PL | PT | CC | NC | Awards |
|---|---|---|---|---|---|---|---|---|---|---|---|---|---|---|---|---|---|
| 1 | Fred Cozens | 1919 | 8 | 2 | 6 | 0 | 0.250 | — | — | — | — | — | — | — | — | — | — |
| 2 | Harry Trotter | 1920–1922 | 16 | 2 | 13 | 1 | 0.156 | 1 | 13 | 1 | 0.100 | — | — | — | 0 | — | — |
| 3 | James J. Cline | 1923–1924 | 15 | 2 | 10 | 3 | 0.233 | 0 | 9 | 1 | 0.050 | — | — | — | 0 | — | — |
| 4 | William H. Spaulding | 1928–1938 | 131 | 72 | 51 | 8 | 0.580 | 33 | 34 | 6 | 0.493 | 1 | 0 | 0 | 1 | — | — |
| 5 | Edwin C. Horrell^{†} | 1939–1944 | 61 | 24 | 31 | 6 | 0.443 | 16 | 17 | 5 | 0.487 | 0 | 1 | 0 | 1 | — | — |
| 6 | Bert LaBrucherie | 1945–1948 | 39 | 23 | 16 | 0 | 0.590 | 15 | 11 | 0 | 0.577 | 0 | 1 | 0 | 1 | — | — |
| 7 | Red Sanders^{†} | 1949–1957 | 86 | 66 | 19 | 1 | 0.773 | 47 | 11 | 1 | 0.805 | 0 | 2 | 0 | 3 | 1; 1954 | — |
| 8 | George W. Dickerson | 1958 | 3 | 1 | 2 | 0 | 0.333 | 0 | 1 | 0 | .000 | 0 | 0 | 0 | 0 | 0 | — |
| 9 | Bill Barnes | 1958–1964 | 68 | 31 | 34 | 3 | 0.492 | 15 | 13 | 0 | 0.556 | 0 | 1 | 0 | 2 | 0 | — |
| 10 | Tommy Prothro^{†} | 1965–1970 | 62 | 41 | 18 | 3 | 0.685 | 22 | 10 | 2 | 0.676 | 1 | 0 | 0 | 1 | 0 | — |
| 11 | Pepper Rodgers | 1971–1973 | 32 | 19 | 12 | 1 | 0.609 | 12 | 7 | 1 | 0.625 | 0 | 0 | 0 | 0 | 0 | — |
| 12 | Dick Vermeil | 1974–1975 | 23 | 15 | 5 | 3 | 0.717 | 10 | 3 | 1 | 0.750 | 1 | 0 | 0 | 1 | 0 | — |
| 13 | Terry Donahue^{†} | 1976–1995 | 233 | 151 | 74 | 8 | 0.665 | 98 | 51 | 5 | 0.653 | 8 | 4 | 1 | 5 | 0 | — |
| 14 | Bob Toledo | 1996–2002 | 81 | 49 | 32 | — | 0.605 | 32 | 24 | — | 0.571 | 1 | 2 | — | 2 | 0 | — |
| Int. | Ed Kezirian | 2002 | 1 | 1 | 0 | — | 1.000 | 0 | 0 | — | 0.000 | 0 | 0 | — | 0 | 0 | — |
| 15 | Karl Dorrell | 2003–2007 | 62 | 35 | 27 | — | 0.565 | 24 | 18 | — | 0.571 | 1 | 3 | — | 0 | 0 | — |
| Int. | DeWayne Walker | 2007 | 1 | 0 | 1 | — | 0.000 | 0 | 0 | — | 0.000 | 0 | 0 | — | 0 | 0 | — |
| 16 | Rick Neuheisel | 2008–2011 | 50 | 21 | 29 | — | 0.420 | 13 | 23 | — | 0.361 | 1 | 0 | — | 0 | 0 | — |
| Int. | Mike Johnson | 2011 | 1 | 0 | 1 | — | 0.000 | 0 | 0 | — | 0.000 | 0 | 0 | — | 0 | 0 | — |
| 17 | Jim L. Mora | 2012–2017 | 76 | 46 | 30 | — | 0.605 | 28 | 25 | — | 0.528 | 2 | 2 | — | 0 | 0 | — |
| Int. | Jedd Fisch | 2017 | 2 | 1 | 1 | — | 0.500 | 1 | 0 | — | 1.000 | 0 | 1 | — | 0 | 0 | — |
| 18 | Chip Kelly | 2018–2023 | 69 | 35 | 34 | — | 0.507 | 26 | 25 | — | 0.500 | 1 | 1 | — | 0 | 0 | — |
| 19 | DeShaun Foster | 2024–2025 | 15 | 5 | 10 | — | 0.333 | 3 | 6 | — | 0.333 | 0 | 0 | — | 0 | 0 | — |
| Int. | Tim Skipper | 2025 | 9 | 3 | 6 | — | 0.333 | 3 | 6 | — | 0.333 | 0 | 0 | — | 0 | 0 | — |
| 20 | Bob Chesney | 2026– | 10 | 10 | 0 | — | 1.000 | 7 | 0 | — | 1.000 | 0 | 0 | — | 0 | 0 | — |
