= 1958 Washington State Cougars football team =

American college football season

1958 Washington State Cougars football
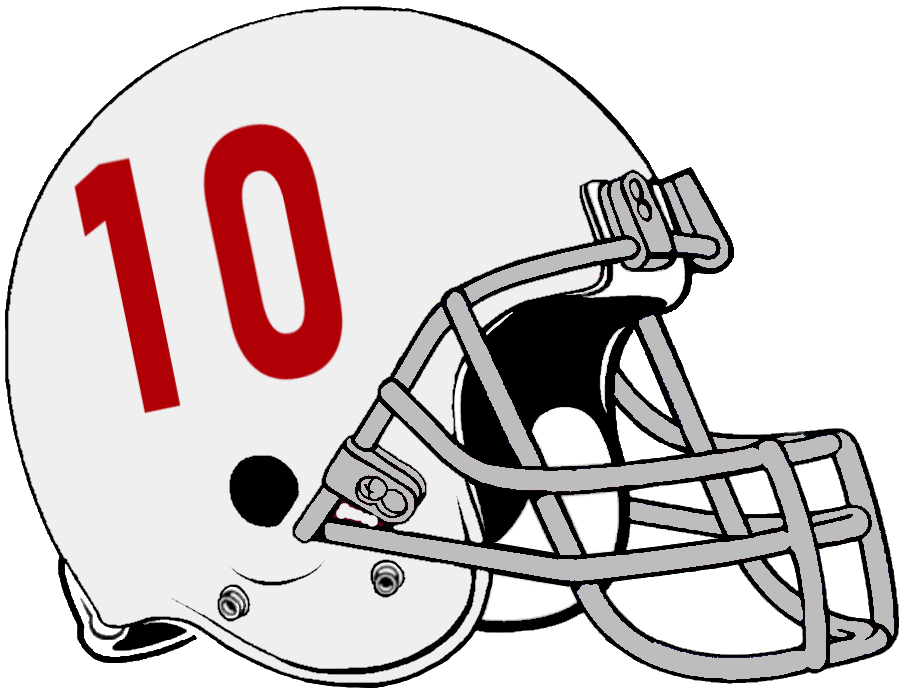
- Conference: Pacific Coast Conference
- Record: 7–3 (6–2 PCC)
- Head coach: Jim Sutherland (3rd season)
- Home stadium: Rogers Field, Memorial Stadium

1958 Pacific Coast Conference football standings
	Conf.					Overall
Team	W		L		T	W		L		T
No. 16 California $	6	–	1	–	0	7	–	4	–	0
Washington State	6	–	2	–	0	7	–	3	–	0
USC	4	–	2	–	1	4	–	5	–	1
Oregon State	5	–	3	–	0	6	–	4	–	0
Oregon	4	–	4	–	0	4	–	6	–	0
UCLA	2	–	4	–	1	3	–	6	–	1
Stanford	2	–	5	–	0	2	–	8	–	0
Washington	1	–	6	–	0	3	–	7	–	0
Idaho	0	–	3	–	0	4	–	5	–	0
$ – Conference champion; Rankings from AP poll

The 1958 Washington State Cougars football team was an American football team that represented Washington State College in the Pacific Coast Conference (PCC) during the 1958 college football season. In their third season under head coach Jim Sutherland, the Cougars compiled a 7–3 record and outscored their opponents 199 to 117. In the final year of the PCC, Washington State was 6–2 in league play, runner-up to California.

The Cougars' statistical leaders included Dave Wilson with 641 passing yards, Chuck Morrell with 571 rushing yards, and Gail Cogdill with 479 receiving yards.

Hopeful for a bowl game invitation, either to the Sugar Bowl or the Gator Bowl, a waiver from the other PCC members was required, as the conference allowed only the Rose Bowl bid. USC and UCLA voted against it, ending the Cougars' season.

== Schedule ==
Date	Opponent	Rank	Site	Result	Attendance	Source
September 20	Stanford		Rogers Field; Pullman, WA	W 40–6	20,750	
September 27	at Northwestern*	No. 10	Dyche Stadium; Evanston, IL	L 28–29	27,420	
October 4	at California		California Memorial Stadium; California, CA	L 14–34	25,000	
October 11	at Idaho		Neale Stadium; Moscow, ID (Battle of the Palouse)	W 8–0	15,000	
October 18	at No. 14 Oregon		Hayward Field; Eugene, OR	W 6–0	18,500	
October 25	USC		Memorial Stadium; Spokane, WA	L 6–14	22,500	
November 1	at UCLA		Los Angeles Memorial Coliseum; Los Angeles, CA	W 38–20	25,090	
November 8	Oregon State^{†}		Rogers Field; Pullman, WA	W 7–0	17,500	
November 15	Pacific (CA)*		Pacific Memorial Stadium; Stockton CA	W 34–0	21,500	
November 22	Washington		Memorial Stadium; Spokane, WA (rivalry)	W 18–14	24,250	
*Non-conference game; ^{†}Homecoming; Rankings from AP Poll released prior to the game; Source:

== Roster ==
1958 Washington State Cougars football team roster
Players
Coaches
Offense

Pos.	#	Name	Class
G	68	Bill Berry	So
OT	78	Ray Blier	Sr
G	60	Angelo Brovelli	Sr
RB	44	Ted Cano	So
E	89	Gail Cogdill	Jr
E	85	Don Ellersick	Jr
E	87	Don Ellingsen	Sr
E	81	Jack Fanning	Sr
G	63	Dick Farrar	Jr
C	50	Ted Gray	Sr
G	62	Ron Green	So
OT	73	Merl Hitzel	Jr
HB	40	Dave Jones	Sr
HB	26	Carl Ketchie	Jr
HB	22	Keith Lincoln	So
OT	70	Myke Lindsay	Jr
HB	37	Phil Mast	Sr
FB	42	Chuck Morrell	Sr
C	52	Marv Nelson	Jr
QB	24	Bob Newman	Sr
HB	23	LaRoy Rath	Jr
HB	39	Ed Shaw	So
G	69	George Somnis	Jr
HB, E	86	Bill Steiger	Sr
FB	45	Eddie Stevens	Sr
OT	77	Al Williamson	Sr
QB	27	Dave Wilson	Sr

Defense

Pos.	#	Name	Class

Special teams

Pos.	#	Name	Class
P	22	Keith Lincoln	So
P	24	Bob Newman	Sr
PK	31	Lee Schroeder	So

Head coach

- Jim Sutherland (3rd year)

Coordinators/assistant coaches

- Bob Gambold
- Jim Lounsberry
- Lloyd Torchio
- Laurie Niemi

Legend

- (C) Team captain
- (S) Suspended
- (I) Ineligible
- Injured
- Redshirt

== NFL draft ==
One Cougar was selected in the 1959 NFL draft, which was 30 rounds and 360 selections.

Player	Position	Round	Overall	Franchise
Carl Ketchie	Back	30	359	Cleveland Browns
