= 1958 Sun Bowl =

The 1958 Sun Bowl may refer to:

- 1958 Sun Bowl (January), January 1, 1958, game between the Louisville Cardinals and the Drake Bulldogs
- 1958 Sun Bowl (December), December 31, 1958, game between the Wyoming Cowboys and the Hardin–Simmons Cowboys
