= 1958 Washington Huskies football team =

American college football season

1958 Washington Huskies football
- Conference: Pacific Coast Conference
- Record: 3–7 (1–6 PCC)
- Head coach: Jim Owens (2nd season)
- Captain: Game captains
- Home stadium: University of Washington Stadium

1958 Pacific Coast Conference football standings
	Conf.					Overall
Team	W		L		T	W		L		T
No. 16 California $	6	–	1	–	0	7	–	4	–	0
Washington State	6	–	2	–	0	7	–	3	–	0
USC	4	–	2	–	1	4	–	5	–	1
Oregon State	5	–	3	–	0	6	–	4	–	0
Oregon	4	–	4	–	0	4	–	6	–	0
UCLA	2	–	4	–	1	3	–	6	–	1
Stanford	2	–	5	–	0	2	–	8	–	0
Washington	1	–	6	–	0	3	–	7	–	0
Idaho	0	–	3	–	0	4	–	5	–	0
$ – Conference champion; Rankings from AP poll

The 1958 Washington Huskies football team was an American football team that represented the University of Washington during the 1958 college football season. In its second season under head coach Jim Owens, the team compiled a 3–7 record, eighth in the Pacific Coast Conference, and was outscored 146 to 102.

== Schedule ==
Date	Opponent	Site	Result	Attendance	Source
September 20	San Jose State*	University of Washington Stadium; Seattle, WA	W 14–6	28,000	
September 27	Minnesota*	University of Washington Stadium; Seattle, WA	W 24–21	38,000	
October 4	at No. 3 Ohio State*	Ohio Stadium; Columbus, OH	L 7–12	82,901	
October 11	at Stanford	Stanford Stadium; Stanford, CA	L 12–22	25,000	
October 18	UCLA	University of Washington Stadium; Seattle, WA	L 0–20	33,500	
October 25	at Oregon State	Multnomah Stadium; Portland, OR	L 12–14	29,057	
November 1	Oregon	University of Washington Stadium; Seattle, WA (rivalry)	W 6–0	32,000	
November 8	at USC	Los Angeles Memorial Coliseum; Los Angeles, CA	L 6–21	32,987	
November 15	California	University of Washington Stadium; Seattle, WA	L 7–12	29,500	
November 22	at Washington State	Memorial Stadium; Spokane, WA (rivalry)	L 14–18	24,250	
*Non-conference game; Rankings from AP Poll released prior to the game; Source:

== Coaching staff ==
- Whitey Core
- Chesty Walker
- Norm Pollom
- Bert Clark
- Dick Heatly
- Tom Tipps

== NFL draft selections ==
Four University of Washington Huskies were selected in the 1959 NFL draft, which lasted 30 rounds with 360 selections.

= Husky Hall of Fame

Player	Position	Round	Pick	NFL club
Luther Carr	Back	21st	246	San Francisco 49ers
Marv Bergmann	Tackle	21st	248	Los Angeles Rams
Mike McCluskey	Back	28th	330	San Francisco 49ers
Don Millich	Back	30th	357	Los Angeles Rams
