= 1958 Stanford Indians football team =

American college football season

1958 Stanford Indians football
- Conference: Pacific Coast Conference
- Record: 2–8 (2–5 PCC)
- Head coach: Jack Curtice (1st season)
- Home stadium: Stanford Stadium

1958 Pacific Coast Conference football standings
	Conf.					Overall
Team	W		L		T	W		L		T
No. 16 California $	6	–	1	–	0	7	–	4	–	0
Washington State	6	–	2	–	0	7	–	3	–	0
USC	4	–	2	–	1	4	–	5	–	1
Oregon State	5	–	3	–	0	6	–	4	–	0
Oregon	4	–	4	–	0	4	–	6	–	0
UCLA	2	–	4	–	1	3	–	6	–	1
Stanford	2	–	5	–	0	2	–	8	–	0
Washington	1	–	6	–	0	3	–	7	–	0
Idaho	0	–	3	–	0	4	–	5	–	0
$ – Conference champion; Rankings from AP poll

The 1958 Stanford Indians football team represented Stanford University in the 1958 college football season. In head coach Jack Curtice's first season at Stanford, the Indians won only two games, ending the season with a 2–8 record, the school's worst since a winless 1947 season. Home games were played on campus at Stanford Stadium in Stanford, California.

== Schedule ==
Date	Opponent	Site	Result	Attendance	Source
September 20	at Washington State	Rogers Field; Pullman, WA	L 6–40	20,750	
September 27	Rice*	Stanford Stadium; Stanford, CA	L 7–30	29,000	
October 4	at Northwestern*	Ryan Field; Evanston, IL	L 0–28	25,132	
October 11	Washington	Stanford Stadium; Stanford, CA	W 22–12	25,000	
October 18	Air Force*	Stanford Stadium; Stanford, CA	L 0–16	40,000	
October 25	at UCLA	Los Angeles Memorial Coliseum; Los Angeles, CA	W 21–19	39,129	
November 1	USC	Stanford Stadium; Stanford, CA (rivalry)	L 6–29	52,000	
November 8	at Oregon	Hayward Field; Eugene, OR	L 0–12	13,500	
November 15	Oregon State	Stanford Stadium; Stanford, CA	L 16–24	22,500	
November 22	at No. 19 California	California Memorial Stadium; Berkeley, CA (Big Game)	L 15–16	81,490	
*Non-conference game; Rankings from AP Poll released prior to the game; Source:

== Players drafted by the NFL ==
Player	Position	Round	Pick	NFL club
Chris Plain	Tackle	19	225	Chicago Bears
