= 1958 Idaho Vandals football team =

American college football season

1958 Idaho Vandals football
- Conference: Pacific Coast Conference
- Record: 4–5 (0–3 PCC)
- Head coach: Skip Stahley (5th season)
- Home stadium: Neale Stadium

1958 Pacific Coast Conference football standings
	Conf.					Overall
Team	W		L		T	W		L		T
No. 16 California $	6	–	1	–	0	7	–	4	–	0
Washington State	6	–	2	–	0	7	–	3	–	0
USC	4	–	2	–	1	4	–	5	–	1
Oregon State	5	–	3	–	0	6	–	4	–	0
Oregon	4	–	4	–	0	4	–	6	–	0
UCLA	2	–	4	–	1	3	–	6	–	1
Stanford	2	–	5	–	0	2	–	8	–	0
Washington	1	–	6	–	0	3	–	7	–	0
Idaho	0	–	3	–	0	4	–	5	–	0
$ – Conference champion; Rankings from AP poll

The 1958 Idaho Vandals football team represented the University of Idaho in the 1958 college football season. The Vandals were led by fifth-year head coach Skip Stahley and were members of the Pacific Coast Conference, which disbanded the following spring. Home games were played on campus at Neale Stadium in Moscow, with one home game in Boise at old Bronco Stadium at Boise Junior College.

The Vandals suffered a fourth straight loss in the Battle of the Palouse with neighbor Washington State, blanked 0–8 at home on October 11. In the rivalry game with Montana at Missoula, the Vandals ran their winning streak over the Grizzlies to seven and retained the Little Brown Stein.

== Schedule ==
Date	Time	Opponent	Site	Result	Attendance	Source
September 20	1:30 pm	at Oregon	Hayward Field; Eugene, OR	L 0–27	14,200	
September 27	11:30 am	at Missouri*	Memorial Stadium; Columbia, MO	L 10–14	18,000	
October 4	7:00 pm	at Utah*	Ute Stadium; Salt Lake City, UT	W 20–0	16,718	
October 11	1:30 pm	Washington State	Neale Stadium; Moscow, ID (Battle of the Palouse)	L 0–8	14,000	
October 18	1:30 pm	Oregon State^{†}	Neale Stadium; Moscow, ID	L 6–20	8,000	
October 25	7:00 pm	at Arizona*	Arizona Stadium; Tucson, AZ	W 24–16		
November 1	12:30 pm	vs. San Jose State*	old Bronco Stadium; Boise, ID	L 6–41	9,500	
November 8	1:00 pm	at Montana*	Dornblaser Field; Missoula, MT (Little Brown Stein)	W 14–6	2,500	
November 15	1:30 pm	at Utah State*	Neale Stadium; Moscow, ID	W 34–7	3,600	
*Non-conference game; ^{†}Homecoming; All times are in Pacific time

== Notable players ==
Although Jerry Kramer and Wayne Walker began their long careers in the NFL in 1958, the Vandals retained some notable players.

Junior Jim Norton of Fullerton, California was a safety and punter for nine seasons with the Houston Oilers; he was the all-time interceptions leader in the American Football League and his #43 was the first retired by the franchise.

Jim Prestel of Indianapolis was a defensive tackle for eight seasons in the NFL, primarily with the expansion Minnesota Vikings. A redshirt junior, he missed most of the previous season due to his mother's terminal illness. Selected in the sixth round of the 1959 NFL draft, 70th overall, he was granted another year of eligibility and played for Idaho in 1959 and began his pro career with the Cleveland Browns in 1960. Prestel was also a standout player on the Vandal basketball team. He played in his final game at Idaho in the Battle of the Palouse in late October with a broken foot, then was sidelined and missed the basketball season.

== Coaching staff ==
- Don Swartz, line
- Ed Knecht, backs
- J. V. Johnson, ends
- Wayne D. Anderson, freshmen

== All-Coast ==
No Vandals made the All-Coast team, but tackle Pete Johnson was a second team selection. Honorable mention were tackle Jim Prestel, guard Jim Roussos, and back Bob Dehlinger.

== NFL draft ==
One senior was selected in the 1959 NFL draft:

Player	Position	Round	Pick	Franchise
Jim Prestel ^	T	6th	70	Cleveland Browns

^ Prestel was granted another year of eligibility and played for Idaho in 1959.

Two fifth-year seniors were previously selected in the 1958 NFL draft:

Player	Position	Round	Pick	Franchise
Wade Patterson	E	16th	183	Chicago Cardinals
Pete Johnson	T	18th	216	Cleveland Browns

Two juniors were selected in the 1960 NFL draft:

Player	Position	Round	Pick	Franchise
Jim Norton	WR	7th	75	Detroit Lions
Stan Fanning	T	11th	128	Chicago Bears
