= 1958 USC Trojans football team =

American college football season

1958 USC Trojans football
- Conference: Pacific Coast Conference
- Record: 4–5–1 (4–2–1 PCC)
- Head coach: Don Clark (2nd season)
- Home stadium: Los Angeles Memorial Coliseum

1958 Pacific Coast Conference football standings
	Conf.					Overall
Team	W		L		T	W		L		T
No. 16 California $	6	–	1	–	0	7	–	4	–	0
Washington State	6	–	2	–	0	7	–	3	–	0
USC	4	–	2	–	1	4	–	5	–	1
Oregon State	5	–	3	–	0	6	–	4	–	0
Oregon	4	–	4	–	0	4	–	6	–	0
UCLA	2	–	4	–	1	3	–	6	–	1
Stanford	2	–	5	–	0	2	–	8	–	0
Washington	1	–	6	–	0	3	–	7	–	0
Idaho	0	–	3	–	0	4	–	5	–	0
$ – Conference champion; Rankings from AP poll

The 1958 USC Trojans football team represented the University of Southern California (USC) in the 1958 college football season. In their second year under head coach Don Clark, the Trojans compiled a 4–5–1 record (4–2–1 against conference opponents), finished in third place in the Pacific Coast Conference, and outscored their opponents by a combined total of 151 to 120.

Tom Maudlin led the team in passing with 41 of 95 passes completed for 535 yards, four touchdowns and 15 interceptions. Don Buford led the team in rushing with 64 carries for 306 yards. Hillard Hill was the leading receiver with 11 catches for 319 yards and five touchdowns.

Four Trojans were recognized by either the Associated Press (AP) or the conference coaches on the 1958 All-Pacific Coast Conference football team: end Marlin McKeever (AP-1; Coaches-1); tackle Dan Ficca (AP-1; Coaches-2); guard Frank Florentino (Coaches-1 [tie]); and halfback Don Buford (Coaches-2).

== Schedule ==
Date	Opponent	Site	Result	Attendance	Source
September 19	No. 12 Oregon State	Los Angeles Memorial Coliseum; Los Angeles, CA	W 21–0	40,286	
September 27	at Michigan*	Michigan Stadium; Ann Arbor, MI	L 19–20	77,005	
October 3	North Carolina*	Los Angeles Memorial Coliseum; Los Angeles, CA	L 7–8	43,238	
October 11	at No. 15 Oregon	Multnomah Stadium; Portland, OR	L 0–25	32,734	
October 18	California^{†}	Los Angeles Memorial Coliseum; Los Angeles, CA	L 12–14	34,872	
October 25	at Washington State	Memorial Stadium; Spokane, WA	W 14–6	22,500	
November 1	at Stanford	Stanford Stadium; Stanford, CA (rivalry)	W 29–6	52,000	
November 8	Washington	Los Angeles Memorial Coliseum; Los Angeles, CA	W 21–6	32,987	
November 22	at UCLA	Los Angeles Memorial Coliseum; Los Angeles, CA (Victory Bell)	T 15–15	58,507	
November 29	No. 18 Notre Dame*	Los Angeles Memorial Coliseum; Los Angeles, CA (rivalry)	L 13–20	66,903	
*Non-conference game; ^{†}Homecoming; Rankings from AP Poll released prior to the game; Source:
