= 1958 UCLA Bruins football team =

American college football season

1958 UCLA Bruins football
- Conference: Pacific Coast Conference
- Record: 3–6–1 (2–4–1 PCC)
- Head coach: George W. Dickerson (1st season; first 3 games); Bill Barnes (1st season; final 7 games)
- Captain: Jim Steffen
- Home stadium: Los Angeles Memorial Coliseum

1958 Pacific Coast Conference football standings
	Conf.					Overall
Team	W		L		T	W		L		T
No. 16 California $	6	–	1	–	0	7	–	4	–	0
Washington State	6	–	2	–	0	7	–	3	–	0
USC	4	–	2	–	1	4	–	5	–	1
Oregon State	5	–	3	–	0	6	–	4	–	0
Oregon	4	–	4	–	0	4	–	6	–	0
UCLA	2	–	4	–	1	3	–	6	–	1
Stanford	2	–	5	–	0	2	–	8	–	0
Washington	1	–	6	–	0	3	–	7	–	0
Idaho	0	–	3	–	0	4	–	5	–	0
$ – Conference champion; Rankings from AP poll

The 1958 UCLA Bruins football team was an American football team that represented the University of California, Los Angeles in the Pacific Coast Conference during the 1958 college football season. In their first year under head coaches George W. Dickerson (three games) and then Bill Barnes (seven games), the Bruins compiled a 3–6–1 record (2–4–1 in PCC, sixth).

UCLA's offensive leaders in 1958 were quarterback Don Long with 395 passing yards, Ray Smith with 307 rushing yards, and John Brown with 259 receiving yards.

Five weeks before the first game, head coach Red Sanders died of a heart attack at age 53 in a Los Angeles hotel room. Dickerson was promoted to head coach several days later, but after two hospitalizations for nervous exhaustion, Barnes was named head coach prior to the fourth game, and remained through the 1964 season.

== Schedule ==
Date	Opponent	Site	Result	Attendance	Source
September 20	No. 19 Pittsburgh*	Los Angeles Memorial Coliseum; Los Angeles, CA	L 6–27	30,578	
September 27	at Illinois*	Memorial Stadium; Champaign, IL	W 18–14	46,775	
October 4	at Oregon State	Parker Stadium; Corvallis, OR	L 0–14	18,532	
October 10	Florida*	Los Angeles Memorial Coliseum; Los Angeles, CA	L 14–21	31,175	
October 18	at Washington	Husky Stadium; Seattle, WA	W 20–0	33,500	
October 25	Stanford	Los Angeles Memorial Coliseum; Los Angeles, CA	L 19–21	39,129	
November 1	Washington State	Los Angeles Memorial Coliseum; Los Angeles, CA	L 20–38	25,090	
November 8	at California	California Memorial Stadium; Berkeley, CA (rivalry)	L 17–20	50,000	
November 15	Oregon	Los Angeles Memorial Coliseum; Los Angeles, CA	W 7–3	22,297	
November 22	USC	Los Angeles Memorial Coliseum; Los Angeles, CA (Victory Bell)	T 15–15	58,507	
*Non-conference game; Rankings from AP Poll released prior to the game; Source:

== Personnel ==
=== Players ===
- Glen Almquist, end, junior
- Harry Baldwin, center, sophomore
- Ray Benstead, center, senior
- Dean Betts, tackle
- John Brown, receiver, senior
- Dick Butler, center, senior
- Rod Cochran, guard
- John Davis, wingback
- Rod Fagerholm, tackle
- Gene Gaines, fullback
- Steve Gertsman, quarterback
- Joe Harper, guard
- Jim Johnson, receiver
- Chuck Kendall, tailback
- Billy Kilmer, tailback, sophomore
- Bob King, guard, senior
- Bill Leeka, guard, senior
- Don Long, tailback, senior
- Tony Longo, tackle
- Marv Luster, end, sophomore
- Jack Metcalf, guard, sophomore
- Trusse Norris, lineman
- Paul Oglesby, tackle, junior
- Phil Parslow, wingback, senior
- Dave Peterson, quarterback
- Art Phillips, junior
- John Pierovich, end
- Mike Riskas, guard, senior
- Ray Smith, fullback, junior
- "Skip" Smith, tailback, junior
- Jim Steffen, tailback
- Ben Treat, center, sophomore
- Jim Wallace, defensive tackle
- Dick Wallen, end
- Clint Whitfield, guard
- Kirk Wilson, punter

=== Coaching staff ===
- George W. Dickerson - head coach
- Bill Barnes - acting head coach following death of Red Sanders
- Assistant coaches - John Johnson, Bob Bergdahl (frosh coach), Deke Brackett, Sam Boghosian, and Dan Peterson

=== Other personnel ===
- Trainer - Ducky Drake
- Assistant trainer - Larry Carter
- Team physician - Dr. Martin Blazina
- Varsity football managers - Tom Naykama, Bob Nishimura, Peter Dalis (senior manager), Perry Gluckman, Tony Giovanazzo, Larry Kasindorf
