= Bill Barnes (American football) =

American football player and coach (1917–2009)

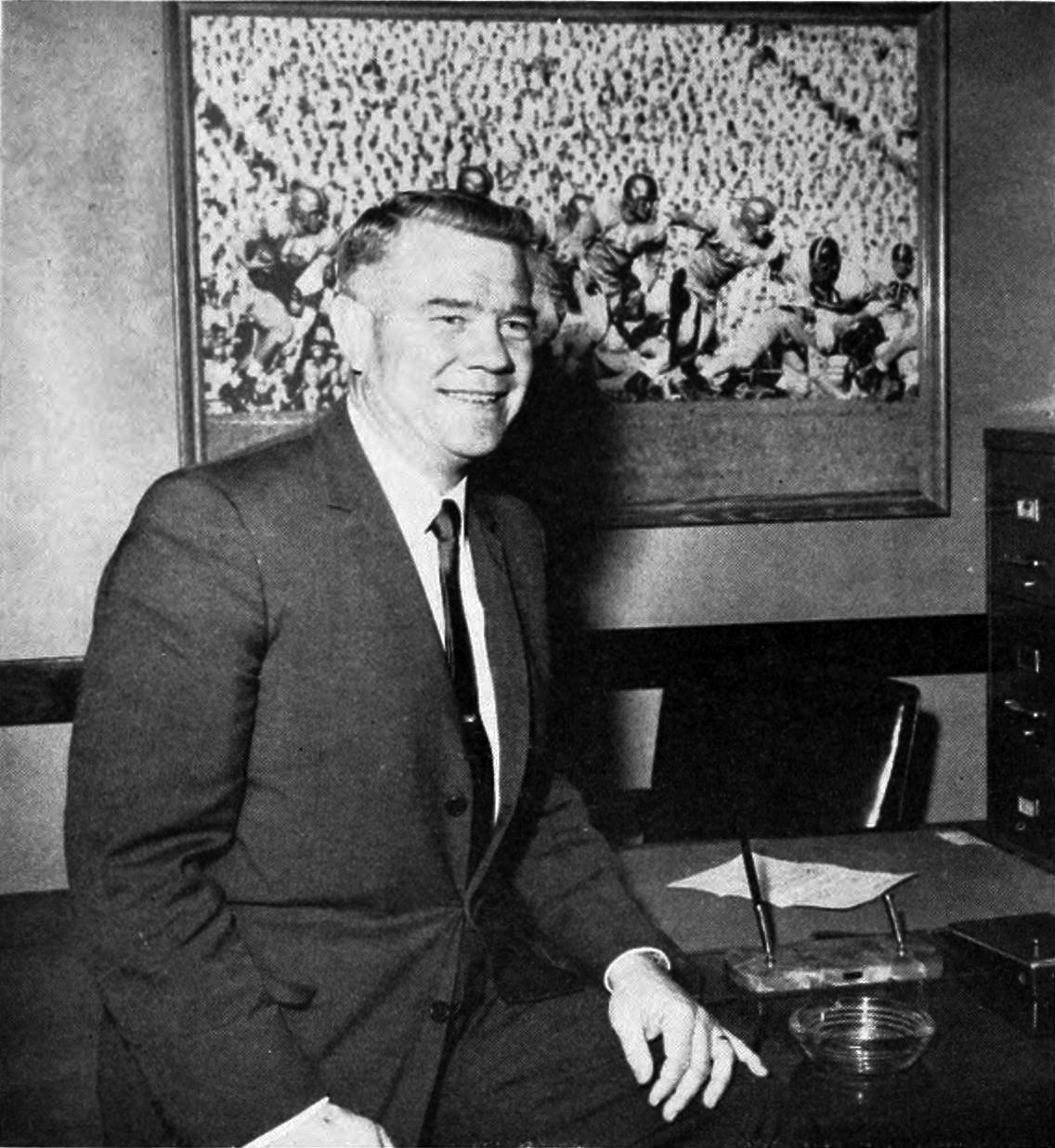

Biographical details
- Born: October 20, 1917; Cape Girardeau, Missouri, U.S.
- Died: April 23, 2009 (aged 91); Santa Monica, California, U.S.

Playing career
- 1937–1939: Tennessee

Coaching career (HC unless noted)
- 1941: Tennessee (assistant)
- 1946–1949: Arkansas (assistant)
- 1950–1958: UCLA (assistant)
- 1958–1964: UCLA

Head coaching record
- Overall: 31–34–3
- Bowls: 0–1

Accomplishments and honors

Championships
- 2 AAWU (1959, 1961)

William F. Barnes (October 20, 1917 – April 23, 2009) was an American college football player and coach. He was the head football coach at the University of California, Los Angeles (UCLA) from 1958 to 1964. Barnes guided his UCLA Bruins teams to a 31–34–3 (.478) record, including two seven-win seasons in 1960 and 1961 and an appearance in the 1962 Rose Bowl.

== Early life, playing career, and military service ==
Born in Cape Girardeau, Missouri, Barnes played high school football in Tennessee for Central High School in Memphis.

Barnes played college football at the University of Tennessee under head coach Robert Neyland, and was a member of the 1939 team that went through the regular season without allowing a point to be scored. The Volunteers were invited to play in the Rose Bowl, but lost 14–0 to USC.

Barnes served during World War II and was assigned to the Alamo Scouts. He earned two Bronze Star Medals, a Silver Star, Legion of Merit, a Philippine Ribbon, and an Alamo Scout Commendation, and ascended to the rank of major.

== Coaching career ==
After the war, Barnes served as an assistant football coach at the University of Arkansas for four seasons. He moved west to UCLA in 1950 to serve as an assistant under head coach Red Sanders. When Sanders died of a heart attack shortly before the 1958 season on August 14, fellow Bruins assistant George W. Dickerson was promoted to head coach. Two weeks later on August 30, Dickerson was admitted to the UCLA Medical Center with "nervous exhaustion". Dickerson returned on September 11, and led the Bruins for three games as head coach, losing to #21 Pittsburgh on September 20, winning at Illinois, then losing 14–0 at Oregon State.

On the night before the Florida game, Dickerson was admitted to the UCLA Medical Center, again suffering from nervous exhaustion; Barnes was named acting head coach for the rest of the season. He remained through 1964 and guided his teams to a 31–34–3 (.478) record. Barnes won two conference (AAWU) titles in 1959 and 1961, and led the sixteenth-ranked Bruins to the Rose Bowl. Three of the assistant coaches from Sanders' 1954 national championship team later served as head coaches for the Bruins: Dickerson, Barnes, and Tommy Prothro. Sanders and Prothro also were from Tennessee.

After going 10–20 (.333) in his last three seasons, Barnes resigned after the 1964 season after learning that athletic director J. D. Morgan was not going to renew his contract.

== Later life and honors ==
After leaving UCLA, Barnes became a National Football League (NFL) scout, and later became a real estate developer. Barnes died at UCLA Medical Center, Santa Monica at the age of 91. He was survived by his wife Frances, to whom he had been married for 62 years; they had no children.

Barnes was inducted into the Tennessee Sports Hall of Fame in 2001.

== Head coaching record ==
Year	Team	Overall	Conference	Standing	Bowl/playoffs	Coaches^{#}	AP^{°}
UCLA Bruins (Pacific Coast Conference) (1958)
1958	UCLA	2–4–1	2–3–1	6th			
UCLA Bruins (Athletic Association of Western Universities) (1959–1964)
1959	UCLA	5–4–1	3–1	T–1st			
1960	UCLA	7–2–1	2–2	3rd			
1961	UCLA	7–4	3–1	1st	L Rose		16
1962	UCLA	4–6	1–3	5th			
1963	UCLA	2–8	2–2	3rd			
1964	UCLA	4–6	2–2	4th			
UCLA:		31–34–3	15–12				
Total:		31–34–3					
National championship Conference title Conference division title or championship game berth
^{#}Rankings from final Coaches Poll.; ^{°}Rankings from final AP Poll.

== Bibliography ==
- UCLA Football Media Guide (PDF Copy available at www.uclabruins.com)
- Wolf, Al - SPORTRAITS: Barnes Smart Football Man. Los Angeles Times, October 11, 1958. Bill Barnes, moving up to become UCLA's head football coach for the rest of the season Thursday when nervous exhaustion again struck down George Dickerson, is a pleasant, smallish fellow of 40
