= 1958 BYU Cougars football team =

American college football season

1958 BYU Cougars football
- Conference: Skyline Conference
- Record: 6–4 (5–2 Skyline Six)
- Head coach: Hal Kopp (3rd season)
- Home stadium: Cougar Stadium

1958 Skyline Conference football standings
	Conf.					Overall
Team	W		L		T	W		L		T
Wyoming $	6	–	1	–	0	8	–	3	–	0
New Mexico	5	–	1	–	0	7	–	3	–	0
BYU	5	–	2	–	0	6	–	4	–	0
Colorado State	4	–	3	–	0	6	–	4	–	0
Utah	3	–	3	–	0	4	–	7	–	0
Utah State	2	–	5	–	0	3	–	7	–	0
Denver	2	–	5	–	0	2	–	8	–	0
Montana	0	–	7	–	0	0	–	10	–	0
$ – Conference champion

The 1958 BYU Cougars football team was an American football team that represented Brigham Young University (BYU) in the Skyline Conference during the 1958 college football season. In their third and final season under head coach Hal Kopp, the Cougars compiled an overall record of 6–4 with a mark of 5–2 against conference opponents, finished third in the Skyline, and outscored opponents by a total of 189 to 150.

The team's statistical leaders included Wayne Startin with 332 passing yards, Weldon Jackson with 698 rushing yards and 698 yards of total offense, Nyle McFarlane with 42 points, and R. K. Brown with 177 receiving yards.

== Schedule ==
Date	Time	Opponent	Site	Result	Attendance	Source
September 20		Fresno State*	Cougar Stadium; Provo, UT	W 29–7	7,155	
September 27	8:00 p.m.	Utah^{Δ}	Ute Stadium; Salt Lake City, UT (rivalry)	W 14–7	30,193	
October 4		at Colorado State	Colorado Field; Fort Collins, CO	L 6–32	10,500	
October 11		at Pacific (CA)*	Pacific Memorial Stadium; Stockton, CA	L 8–26	25,473	
October 18		North Texas State*	Cougar Stadium; Provo, UT	L 6–12	6,594	
October 25		at Montana	Dornblaser Field; Missoula, MT	W 41–12	5,000	
November 1		at Utah State	Romney Stadium; Logan, UT (rivalry)	W 13–6	9,400	
November 8		New Mexico^{†}	Cougar Stadium; Provo, UT	W 36–19	13,796	
November 15		at Denver	DU Stadium; Denver, CO	W 22–7	8,073	
November 22		Wyoming	Cougar Stadium; Provo, UT	L 14–22	13,368	
*Non-conference game; ^{†}Homecoming; ^{Δ} BYU was designated home team.; All times are in Mountain time
