= Ben Martin (American football) =

American football player and coach (1921–2004)

Biographical details
- Born: June 28, 1921; Prospect Park, Pennsylvania, U.S.
- Died: July 24, 2004 (aged 83); Colorado Springs, Colorado, U.S.

Playing career
- 1941: Princeton
- 1942–1944: Navy
- Position: Halfback

Coaching career (HC unless noted)
- 1949–1954: Navy (assistant)
- 1956–1957: Virginia
- 1958–1977: Air Force

Head coaching record
- Overall: 102–116–10
- Bowls: 0–2–1

Accomplishments and honors

Awards
- Third-team All-American (1944)
- Military career
- Allegiance: United States
- Branch: United States Navy
- Service years: 1945–1949
- Rank: Lieutenant (junior grade)
- Unit: USS Helena
- Conflicts: World War II; Cold War

Benjamin S. Martin (June 27, 1921 – July 24, 2004) was an American college football player and coach. He served as the head football coach at the University of Virginia from 1956 to 1957 and the United States Air Force Academy from 1958 to 1977, compiling a career head coaching record of 102–116–10 (.469).

A native of Prospect Park, Pennsylvania, Martin played college football at Princeton University in 1941 and then moved to the United States Naval Academy; he was a member of the class of 1946, which graduated early in 1945 due to World War II. After sea duty on the USS Helena, Martin was an assistant coach at Navy from 1949 to 1954; that last team was 8–2, among the best in program history, and won the Sugar Bowl. His first team at Air Force in 1958 was undefeated (with two ties), played in the Cotton Bowl, and finished in the top ten in both polls.

Martin also ran track and field for Navy, earning three letters as a runner.

Martin died at age 83 in 2004 in Colorado Springs, Colorado, and was buried in Maryland at the Naval Academy Cemetery. He was inducted into the Air Force Falcons Hall of Fame in 2009.

== Head coaching record ==
Year	Team	Overall	Conference	Standing	Bowl/playoffs	Coaches^{#}	AP^{°}
Virginia Cavaliers (Atlantic Coast Conference) (1956–1957)
1956	Virginia	3–7	1–4	8th			
1957	Virginia	3–6–1	2–4	6th			
Virginia:		6–13–1	3–8				
Air Force Falcons (Independent) (1958–1977)
1958	Air Force	9–0–2			T Cotton	8	6
1959	Air Force	5–4–1					
1960	Air Force	4–6					
1961	Air Force	3–7					
1962	Air Force	5–5					
1963	Air Force	7–4			L Gator		
1964	Air Force	4–5–1					
1965	Air Force	3–6–1					
1966	Air Force	4–6					
1967	Air Force	2–6–2					
1968	Air Force	7–3					
1969	Air Force	6–4					
1970	Air Force	9–3			L Sugar	11	16
1971	Air Force	6–4					
1972	Air Force	6–4					
1973	Air Force	6–4					
1974	Air Force	2–9					
1975	Air Force	2–8–1					
1976	Air Force	4–7					
1977	Air Force	2–8–1					
Air Force:		96–103–9					
Total:		102–116–10					
^{#}Rankings from final Coaches Poll.; ^{°}Rankings from final AP Poll.
