= 1958 Oregon Ducks football team =

American college football season

1958 Oregon Ducks football
- Conference: Pacific Coast Conference
- Record: 4–6 (4–4 PCC)
- Head coach: Len Casanova (8th season)
- Captain: Ron Stover
- Home stadium: Hayward Field, Multnomah Stadium

1958 Pacific Coast Conference football standings
	Conf.					Overall
Team	W		L		T	W		L		T
No. 16 California $	6	–	1	–	0	7	–	4	–	0
Washington State	6	–	2	–	0	7	–	3	–	0
USC	4	–	2	–	1	4	–	5	–	1
Oregon State	5	–	3	–	0	6	–	4	–	0
Oregon	4	–	4	–	0	4	–	6	–	0
UCLA	2	–	4	–	1	3	–	6	–	1
Stanford	2	–	5	–	0	2	–	8	–	0
Washington	1	–	6	–	0	3	–	7	–	0
Idaho	0	–	3	–	0	4	–	5	–	0
$ – Conference champion; Rankings from AP poll

The 1958 Oregon Ducks football team represented the University of Oregon in the Pacific Coast Conference (PCC) during the 1958 college football season. In their eighth season under head coach Len Casanova, the Ducks compiled a 4–6 record (4–4 against PCC opponents), finished in fifth place in the PCC, and outscored their opponents, 93 to 50. The team played home games at Hayward Field in Eugene, Oregon and Multnomah Stadium in Portland, Oregon.

The team's statistical leaders included Dave Grosz with 468 passing yards and Willie West with 470 rushing yards and 140 receiving yards.

== Schedule ==
Date	Opponent	Rank	Site	Result	Attendance	Source
September 20	Idaho		Hayward Field; Eugene, OR	W 27–0	14,200	
October 4	at No. 1 Oklahoma*		Oklahoma Memorial Stadium; Norman, OK	L 0–6	61,700	
October 11	USC	No. 15	Multnomah Stadium; Portland, OR	W 25–0	32,734	
October 18	Washington State	No. 14	Hayward Field; Eugene, OR	L 0–6	18,500	
October 25	at California		California Memorial Stadium; Berkeley, CA	L 6–23	47,000	
November 1	at Washington		Husky Stadium; Seattle, WA (rivalry)	L 0–6	32,000	
November 8	Stanford		Hayward Field; Eugene, OR	W 12–0	13,500	
November 15	at UCLA		Los Angeles Memorial Coliseum; Los Angeles, CA	L 3–7	22,297	
November 22	at Oregon State		Parker Stadium; Corvallis, OR (Civil War)	W 20–0	27,574	
December 6	at Miami (FL)*		Burdine Stadium; Miami, FL	L 0–2	22,898	
*Non-conference game; Rankings from AP Poll released prior to the game; Source:
