= 1958 Montana Grizzlies football team =

American college football season

1958 Montana Grizzlies football
- Conference: Skyline Conference
- Record: 0–10 (0–7 Skyline)
- Head coach: Ray Jenkins (1st season)
- Home stadium: Dornblaser Field

1958 Skyline Conference football standings
	Conf.					Overall
Team	W		L		T	W		L		T
Wyoming $	6	–	1	–	0	8	–	3	–	0
New Mexico	5	–	1	–	0	7	–	3	–	0
BYU	5	–	2	–	0	6	–	4	–	0
Colorado State	4	–	3	–	0	6	–	4	–	0
Utah	3	–	3	–	0	4	–	7	–	0
Utah State	2	–	5	–	0	3	–	7	–	0
Denver	2	–	5	–	0	2	–	8	–	0
Montana	0	–	7	–	0	0	–	10	–	0
$ – Conference champion

The 1958 Montana Grizzlies football team represented the University of Montana in the 1958 college football season as a member of the Skyline Conference (Skyline). The Grizzlies were led by first-year head coach Ray Jenkins, played their home games at Dornblaser Field and finished the season with a record of zero wins and ten losses (0–10, 0–7 MSC).

== Schedule ==
Date	Opponent	Site	Result	Attendance	Source
September 20	at Utah	Ute Stadium; Salt Lake City, UT	L 6–20	16,666	
September 27	vs. Wyoming	Daylis Stadium; Billings, MT (Midland Roundtable Grid Classic)	L 14–21	8,200	
October 4	at New Mexico	Zimmerman Field; Albuquerque, NM	L 16–44	11,200	
October 10	at Denver	DU Stadium; Denver, CO	L 0–29	7,944	
October 18	Utah State^{†}	Dornblaser Field; Missoula, MT	L 14–27	6,214	
October 25	BYU	Dornblaser Field; Missoula, MT	L 12–41	5,000	
November 1	at Colorado State	Colorado Field; Fort Collins, CO	L 7–57	8,000	
November 8	Idaho*	Dornblaser Field; Missoula, MT (Little Brown Stein)	L 6–14	2,500	
November 15	No. 7 Montana State*	Dornblaser Field; Missoula, MT (rivalry)	L 6–20	7,500	
November 27	at San Diego*	Balboa Stadium; San Diego, CA	L 13–24	4,600	
*Non-conference game; ^{†}Homecoming; Rankings from UPI Poll released prior to the game
