= George W. Dickerson =

American football player and coach (1913–2002)

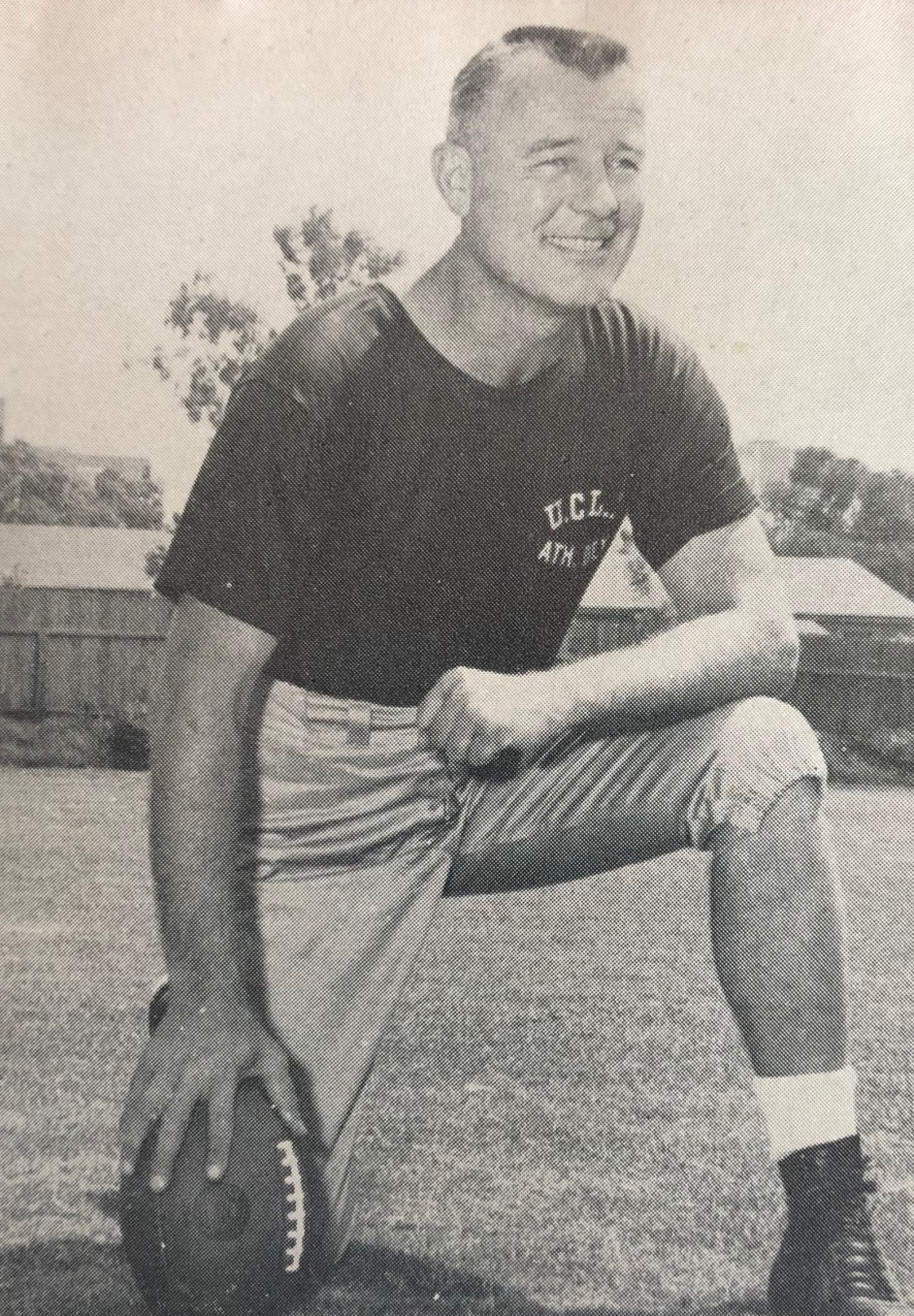
- Dickerson at UCLA, c. 1958

Biographical details
- Born: January 27, 1913; Galion, Ohio, U.S.
- Died: January 22, 2002 (aged 88); Laguna Woods, California, U.S.

Playing career
- 1934–1936: UCLA
- Position: Tackle

Coaching career (HC unless noted)
- 1947–1957: UCLA (assistant)
- 1958: UCLA

Head coaching record
- Overall: 1–2

George W. Dickerson (January 27, 1913 – January 22, 2002) was an American college football coach at the University of California at Los Angeles (UCLA). An assistant coach with the Bruins from 1947 to 1957, he was the interim head coach for the first three games in 1958 after the unexpected death of Red Sanders in mid-August. Dickerson was inducted into the UCLA Athletics Hall of Fame in 1987.

== Early life and education ==
Born in Galion, Ohio, Dickerson was raised in southern California and attended Fairfax High School in Los Angeles. At UCLA, he lettered in football for three years and rugby for four. He was also a boxer, and was captain of the 1936 football team.

== Coaching career ==
Dickerson returned to UCLA to serve as an assistant coach for Red Sanders. When Sanders died of a heart attack in mid-August 1958, Dickerson was promoted to head coach several days later. Less than two weeks after, he was admitted to the UCLA Medical Center with nervous exhaustion. Dickerson returned to coach the Bruins on September 11, and led the team for the first three games as head coach. UCLA lost the opener to #21 Pittsburgh on September 20, won at Illinois, then were shut out 14–0 at Oregon State.

Bill Barnes was named acting head coach for the Friday night game against Florida on October 10 (and continued through the 1964) season). Dickerson had been re-admitted to the UCLA Medical Center late the previous evening, again suffering from nervous exhaustion.

Dickerson was one of three assistants from the national championship season of 1954 to later lead the Bruins as head coach, along with Barnes and Tommy Prothro.

== Head coaching record ==
Year	Team	Overall	Conference	Standing	Bowl/playoffs
UCLA Bruins (Pacific Coast Conference) (1958)
1958	UCLA	1–2	0–1		
UCLA:		1–2	0–1		
Total:		1–2			
