= Ray Jenkins (American football) =

American athletics coach

Biographical details
- Born: c. 1920

Playing career

Football
- 1939–1941: Colorado

Track and field
- c. 1940: Colorado

Wrestling
- c. 1940: Colorado (football); Discus throw (track and field)
- Position: Fullback

Coaching career (HC unless noted)

Football
- 1946–1947: Colorado Mines (line)
- 1948–1953: Colorado (freshmen)
- 1954–1957: Colorado (ends)
- 1958–1963: Montana (assistant)

Track and field
- 1946–1948: Colorado Mines

Wrestling
- 1946–1948: Colorado Mines
- 1948–?: Colorado

Administrative career (AD unless noted)
- 1964–1968: San Francisco 49ers (scout)
- 1968–c. 1980: New Orleans Saints (scout)

Head coaching record
- Overall: 14–43 (football)

Ray "Earthquake" Jenkins (c. 1920 – ?) was an American football, track and field, and wrestling coach. He served as the head football coach at the University of Montana from 1958 to 1963, compiling a record of 14–43. A native of Cheraw, Colorado, Jenkins attended the University of Colorado Boulder, where he lettered in football, track and field, and wrestling. After he was fired from his post at Montana, he worked as a scout for the San Francisco 49ers and the New Orleans Saints of the National Football League (NFL).

Jenkins was an All-American thrower for the Colorado Buffaloes track and field team, placing 5th in the discus throw at the 1946 NCAA track and field championships.

== Head coaching record ==
=== Football ===
Year	Team	Overall	Conference	Standing	Bowl/playoffs
Montana Grizzlies (Skyline Conference) (1958–1961)
1958	Montana	0–10	0–7	8th	
1959	Montana	1–8	1–5	8th	
1960	Montana	5–5	2–5	T–5th	
1961	Montana	2–6	2–4	T–5th	
Montana Grizzlies (NCAA University Division independent) (1962)
1962	Montana	5–5			
Montana Grizzlies (Big Sky Conference) (1963)
1963	Montana	1–9	0–3	4th	
Montana:		14–43	5–24		
Total:		14–43			
