= 1959 Cotton Bowl Classic =

- 23rd Cotton Bowl Classic
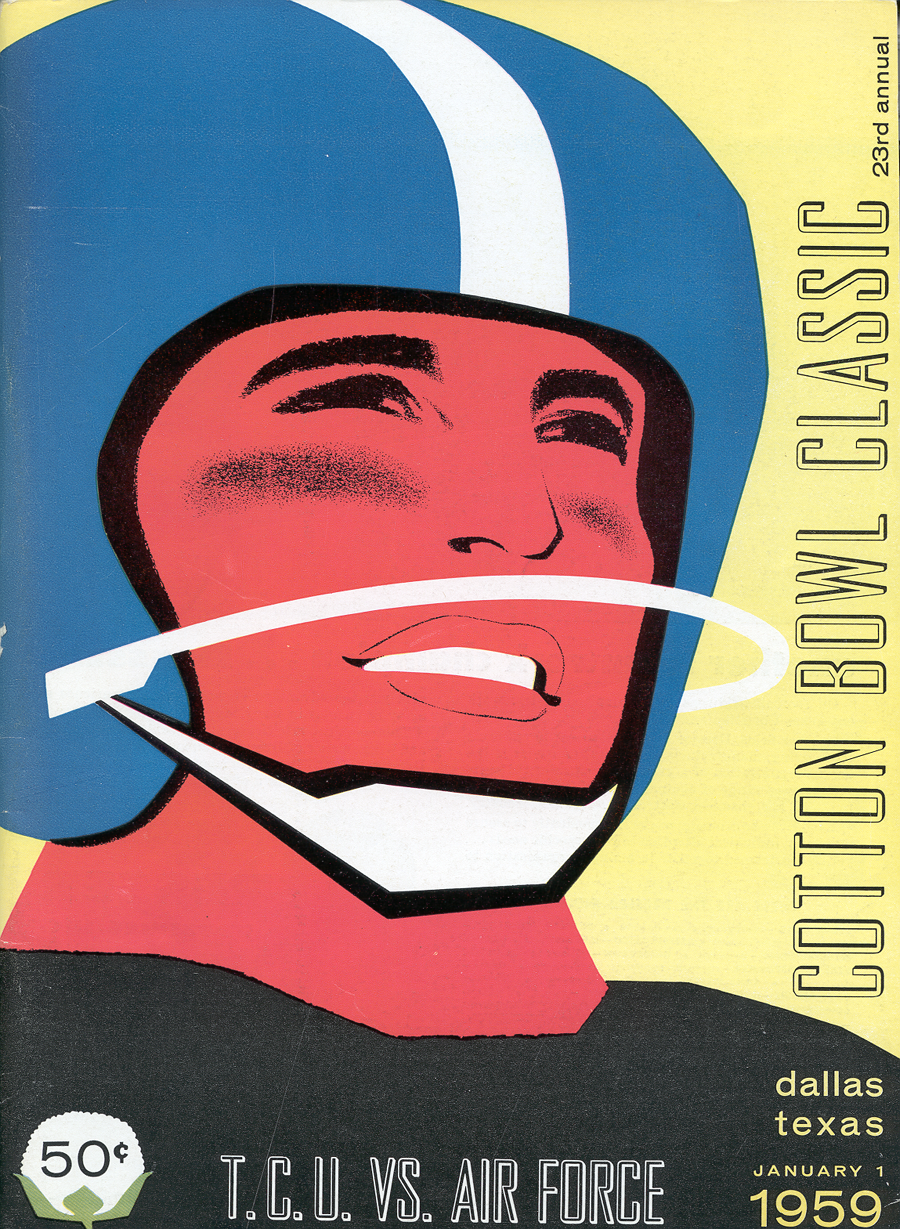
Air Force Falcons	TCU Horned Frogs
(9–0–1)	(8–2)
Independent	SWC
0	0
Head coach: Ben Martin	Head coach: Abe Martin
AP / Coaches; 6 / 8	AP / Coaches; 10 / 9
	1	2	3	4	Total
Air Force	0	0	0	0	0
TCU	0	0	0	0	0
- Date: January 1, 1959
- Season: 1958
- Stadium: Cotton Bowl
- Location: Dallas, Texas
- MVP: Dave Phillips (Air Force T); Jack Spikes (TCU FB)
- Favorite: TCU by 8
- Referee: Carl Bredt (SWC); split crew: SWC, Big Seven)
- Attendance: 75,504

United States TV coverage
- Network: CBS
- Announcers: Tom Harmon, Darrell Royal

The Cotton Bowl in Dallas, Texas, hosted the Cotton Bowl Classic.

The 1959 Cotton Bowl Classic was the 23rd edition of the college football bowl game, played at the Cotton Bowl in Dallas, Texas, on Thursday, January 1. Part of the 1958–59 bowl game season, it matched the independent and sixth-ranked Air Force Falcons and the No. 10 TCU Horned Frogs of the Southwest Conference (SWC).

This was the first tie in the game in eleven years, and the first scoreless game in twelve years.

== Teams ==
=== Air Force ===
Undefeated Air Force had a tie during the regular season, 13–13 to Iowa; the Hawkeyes went on to win the Big Ten Conference and the Rose Bowl. The Falcons were ranked in the polls for the seventh straight week, #8 for the second straight week, and were making their first-ever bowl appearance.

=== TCU ===
TCU was unbeaten in Southwest Conference until a 20–13 loss to SMU in the last game of the season. The Horned Frogs had also spent seven weeks in the polls, though they were unranked going into this game. Coincidentally, they also had played Iowa, but lost 17–0. This was TCU's fourth bowl game in seven years and were favored by eight points.

== Game summary ==
Although it had snowed two days earlier, the field was clear and the weather was sunny and 44 °F (7 °C) for the 2:30 p.m. CST kickoff.

In the end, it was six lost fumbles (out of 13 in total) and five missed field goals that decided the scoreless outcome. The Falcons at one point had the ball at TCU's 6-yard line before being stuffed, but when they tried to kick a field goal from the 12, George Pupich's kick sailed wide left. Pupich missed two more (one from 34 and the other from 52) while TCU missed two of their own.

TCU went 3 for 11 on passing for a woeful 37 yards but had 190 yards rushing on 48 attempts. Air Force barely did better with 12 for 23 passing for 91 yards and two interceptions. Both teams finished with over 227 yards yet had more punts (16) then points. Dave Phillips of Air Force and Jack Spikes of TCU were named Outstanding Players.

== Statistics ==
Statistics	TCU	Air Force
First downs	9	13
Yards rushing	190	140
Yards passing	37	91
Total yards	227	231
Punts-Average	9–38.4	7–38.1
Fumbles-Lost	8–3	5–3
Interceptions	0	2
Penalties-Yards	8–61	3–15
