= 1958 Utah State Aggies football team =

American college football season

1958 Utah State Aggies football
- Conference: Skyline Conference
- Record: 3–7 (2–5 Skyline)
- Head coach: Ev Faunce (4th season)
- Home stadium: Romney Stadium

1958 Skyline Conference football standings
| | Conf. | | | | | Overall |
| Team | W | | L | | T | W | | L | | T |
|---|---|---|---|---|---|---|---|---|---|---|
| Wyoming $ | 6 | – | 1 | – | 0 | 8 | – | 3 | – | 0 |
| New Mexico | 5 | – | 1 | – | 0 | 7 | – | 3 | – | 0 |
| BYU | 5 | – | 2 | – | 0 | 6 | – | 4 | – | 0 |
| Colorado State | 4 | – | 3 | – | 0 | 6 | – | 4 | – | 0 |
| Utah | 3 | – | 3 | – | 0 | 4 | – | 7 | – | 0 |
| Utah State | 2 | – | 5 | – | 0 | 3 | – | 7 | – | 0 |
| Denver | 2 | – | 5 | – | 0 | 2 | – | 8 | – | 0 |
| Montana | 0 | – | 7 | – | 0 | 0 | – | 10 | – | 0 |
$ – Conference champion

The 1958 Utah State Aggies football team was an American football team that represented Utah State University in the Skyline Conference during the 1958 college football season. In their fourth season under head coach Ev Faunce, the Aggies compiled a 3–7 record (2–5 against Skyline opponents), tied for sixth in the Skyline Conference, and were outscored by opponents by a total of 188 to 123.

== Schedule ==
| Date | Opponent | Site | Result | Attendance | Source |
|---|---|---|---|---|---|
| September 20 | at Arizona* | Arizona Stadium; Tucson, AZ | L 6–7 | 18,005–18,947 | |
| September 26 | Denver | Romney Stadium; Logan, UT | L 8–20 | 6,209–7,100 | |
| October 4 | at Kansas State* | Memorial Stadium; Manhattan, KS | W 20–13 | 9,866 | |
| October 11 | at New Mexico | Zimmerman Field; Albuquerque, NM | L 14–34 | 11,700 | |
| October 18 | at Montana | Dornblaser Field; Missoula, MT | W 27–14 | 6,214 | |
| October 25 | Colorado State | Romney Stadium; Logan, UT | W 15–0 | 7,397 | |
| November 1 | BYU | Romney Stadium; Logan, UT (rivalry) | L 6–13 | 9,400 | |
| November 8 | Wyoming | Romney Stadium; Logan, UT (rivalry) | L 13–41 | 3,815 | |
| November 15 | at Idaho* | Neale Stadium; Moscow, ID | L 7–34 | 3,864 | |
| November 27 | at Utah | Ute Stadium; Salt Lake City, UT (rivalry) | L 7–21 | 15,112 | |
*Non-conference game
