= 1958 Colorado State Rams football team =

American college football season

1958 Colorado State Rams football
- Conference: Skyline Conference
- Record: 6–4 (4–3 Skyline)
- Head coach: Don Mullison (3rd season)
- Home stadium: Colorado Field

1958 Skyline Conference football standings
	Conf.					Overall
Team	W		L		T	W		L		T
Wyoming $	6	–	1	–	0	8	–	3	–	0
New Mexico	5	–	1	–	0	7	–	3	–	0
BYU	5	–	2	–	0	6	–	4	–	0
Colorado State	4	–	3	–	0	6	–	4	–	0
Utah	3	–	3	–	0	4	–	7	–	0
Utah State	2	–	5	–	0	3	–	7	–	0
Denver	2	–	5	–	0	2	–	8	–	0
Montana	0	–	7	–	0	0	–	10	–	0
$ – Conference champion

The 1958 Colorado State Rams football team represented Colorado State University in the Skyline Conference during the 1958 college football season. In their third season under head coach Don Mullison, the Rams compiled a 6–4 record (4–3 against Skyline opponents), finished fourth in the Skyline Conference, and outscored opponents by a total of 178 to 110.

The team's statistical leaders included Freddy Glick with 380 passing yards, Wayne Schneider with 580 rushing yards, and Bill Hanks with 140 receiving yards.

== Schedule ==
Date	Opponent	Site	Result	Attendance	Source
September 27	at Drake*	Drake Stadium; Des Moines, IA	W 21–0	16,000	
October 4	BYU	Colorado Field; Fort Collins, CO	W 32–6	10,500	
October 11	at Air Force*	DU Stadium; Denver, CO (rivalry)	L 6–36	17,479	
October 18	Wyoming	Colorado Field; Fort Collins, CO (rivalry)	L 6–7	12,000	
October 25	at Utah State	Romney Stadium; Logan, UT	L 0–15	7,397	
November 1	Montana^{†}	Colorado Field; Fort Collins, CO	W 57–7	8,000	
November 8	Utah	Colorado Field; Fort Collins, CO	W 20–0	5,300	
November 15	at New Mexico	Zimmerman Field; Albuquerque, NM	L 12–17		
November 22	at Colorado*	Folsom Field; Boulder, CO (rivalry)	W 15–14	23,000	
November 27	at Denver	DU Stadium; Denver, CO	W 9–8	4,130	
*Non-conference game; ^{†}Homecoming
