= 1958 New Mexico Lobos football team =

American college football season

1958 New Mexico Lobos football
- Conference: Skyline Conference
- Record: 7–3 (5–1 Skyline)
- Head coach: Marv Levy (1st season)
- Home stadium: Zimmerman Field

1958 Skyline Conference football standings
	Conf.					Overall
Team	W		L		T	W		L		T
Wyoming $	6	–	1	–	0	8	–	3	–	0
New Mexico	5	–	1	–	0	7	–	3	–	0
BYU	5	–	2	–	0	6	–	4	–	0
Colorado State	4	–	3	–	0	6	–	4	–	0
Utah	3	–	3	–	0	4	–	7	–	0
Utah State	2	–	5	–	0	3	–	7	–	0
Denver	2	–	5	–	0	2	–	8	–	0
Montana	0	–	7	–	0	0	–	10	–	0
$ – Conference champion

The 1958 New Mexico Lobos football team represented the University of New Mexico in the Skyline Conference during the 1958 college football season. In their first season under head coach Marv Levy, the Lobos compiled a 7–3 record (5–1 against Skyline opponents), finished second in the conference, and outscored all opponents by a total of 210 to 185.

The team's statistical leaders included Chuck Roberts with 337 passing yards, Don Perkins with 621 rushing yards, and Don Black with 303 receiving yards and 54 points scored. Perkins went on to play eight seasons for the Dallas Cowboys and played in six Pro Bowls.

== Schedule ==
Date	Opponent	Site	Result	Attendance	Source
September 20	at New Mexico A&M*	Memorial Stadium; Las Cruces, NM (rivalry)	W 16–7	6,500	
September 27	at Texas Western*	Kidd Field; El Paso, TX	L 6–15	7,000	
October 4	Montana	Zimmerman Field; Albuquerque, NM	W 44–16	11,200	
October 11	Utah State	Zimmerman Field; Albuquerque, NM	W 34–14	11,700	
October 18	Arizona*^{†}	Zimmerman Field; Albuquerque, NM (rivalry)	W 33–13	13,500	
October 25	at Wyoming	War Memorial Stadium; Laramie, WY	W 13–12	12,000	
October 31	at Denver	DU Stadium; Denver, CO	W 21–15		
November 8	at BYU	Cougar Stadium; Provo, UT	L 19–36	13,796	
November 15	Colorado State	Zimmerman Field; Albuquerque, NM	W 17–12		
November 22	No. 9 Air Force*	Zimmerman Field; Albuquerque, NM	L 7–45		
*Non-conference game; ^{†}Homecoming; Rankings from AP Poll released prior to the game
