= 1958 Utah Utes football team =

American college football season

1958 Utah Utes football
- Conference: Skyline Conference
- Record: 4–7 (3–3 Skyline)
- Head coach: Ray Nagel (1st season)
- Home stadium: Ute Stadium

1958 Skyline Conference football standings
	Conf.					Overall
Team	W		L		T	W		L		T
Wyoming $	6	–	1	–	0	8	–	3	–	0
New Mexico	5	–	1	–	0	7	–	3	–	0
BYU	5	–	2	–	0	6	–	4	–	0
Colorado State	4	–	3	–	0	6	–	4	–	0
Utah	3	–	3	–	0	4	–	7	–	0
Utah State	2	–	5	–	0	3	–	7	–	0
Denver	2	–	5	–	0	2	–	8	–	0
Montana	0	–	7	–	0	0	–	10	–	0
$ – Conference champion

The 1958 Utah Utes football team, or also commonly known as the Utah Redskins, was an American football team that represented the University of Utah as a member of the Skyline Conference during the 1958 college football season. In their first season under head coach Ray Nagel, the Utes compiled an overall record of 4–7 with a mark of 3–3 against conference opponents, placing fifth in the Skyline. Home games were played on campus at Ute Stadium in Salt Lake City. The Skyline Conference champions were led on the field by senior quarterback Lee Grosscup and junior safety and halfback Larry Wilson, a future member of the Pro Football Hall of Fame.

== Schedule ==
Date	Time	Opponent	Site	Result	Attendance	Source
September 20		Montana	Ute Stadium; Salt Lake City, UT	W 20–6	16,666	
September 27	8:00 p.m.	at BYU^{Δ}	Ute Stadium; Salt Lake City, UT (rivalry)	L 7–14	30,193	
October 4		Idaho*	Ute Stadium; Salt Lake City, UT	L 0–20	16,718	
October 11		at California*	California Memorial Stadium; Berkeley, CA	L 21–36	28,000	
October 18		Denver^{†}	Ute Stadium; Salt Lake City, UT	W 20–16		
October 25		No. 14 Air Force*	DU Stadium; Denver, CO	L 14–16	11,647	
November 1		at Wyoming	War Memorial Stadium; Laramie, WY	L 20–25	8,562	
November 8		at Colorado State	Colorado Field; Fort Collins, CO	L 0–20	5,300	
November 15	2:00 p.m.	Colorado*	Ute Stadium; Salt Lake City, UT (rivalry)	L 0–7	4,300	
November 27		Utah State	Ute Stadium; Salt Lake City, UT (rivalry)	W 12–7	15,112	
December 6		at Hawaii*	Honolulu Stadium; Honolulu, Territory of Hawaii	W 47–20	18,000	
*Non-conference game; ^{†}Homecoming; ^{Δ} BYU was designated home team.; Rankings from AP Poll released prior to the game; All times are in Mountain time

== Personnel ==
- QB Lee Grosscup, Sr.

== NFL draft ==
Utah had one player selected in the 1959 NFL draft.

Player	Position	Round	Pick	NFL team
Lee Grosscup	Quarterback	1	10	New York Giants
