= Ev Faunce =

American football player and coach (1926–2009)

Biographical details
- Born: June 12, 1926; Fergus Falls, Minnesota, U.S.
- Died: April 2, 2009 (aged 82); Ogden, Utah, U.S.

Playing career
- 1945: Iowa State
- 1946–1948: Minnesota
- 1949: Baltimore Colts (AAFC)
- Position: Halfback

Coaching career (HC unless noted)
- 1950: Minot State
- 1951–1954: Utah State (assistant)
- 1955–1958: Utah State

Head coaching record
- Overall: 21–26–1

Accomplishments and honors

Awards
- All-Big Nine (1948)

Everett George Faunce (June 12, 1926 – April 2, 2009) was an American football player and coach. Faunce played college football at Iowa State University in 1945 before transferring to the University of Minnesota for the remaining three years of his collegiate career. After a brief stint playing for the Baltimore Colts of the All-America Football Conference (AAFC), he served as the head football coach at Minot State University in 1950 at Utah State University from 1955 to 1958.

== Head coaching record ==
Year	Team	Overall	Conference	Standing	Bowl/playoffs
Minot State Beavers (North Dakota Intercollegiate Conference) (1950)
1950	Minot State	6–2	6–1	2nd	
Minot State:		6–2	6–1		
Utah State Aggies (Skyline Conference) (1955–1956)
1955	Utah State	4–6	3–4	5th	
1956	Utah State	6–4	4–3	T–3rd	
1957	Utah State	2–7–1	1–5–1	8th	
1958	Utah State	3–7	2–5	T–6th	
Utah State:		15–24–1	10–17–1		
Total:		21–26–1			
