= Lee Grosscup =

American football player and sportscaster (1936–2020)

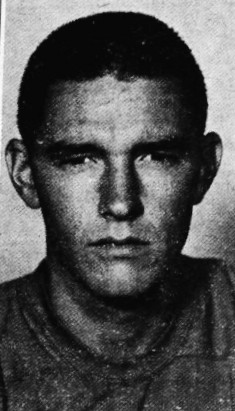
- Grosscup, circa 1958

No. 11, 17, 12
- Position: Quarterback

Personal information
- Born: December 27, 1936; Santa Monica, California, U.S.
- Died: June 1, 2020 (aged 83); Alameda, California, U.S.
- Listed height: 6 ft 1 in (1.85 m)
- Listed weight: 187 lb (85 kg)

Career information
- High school: Santa Monica
- College: Washington (1955); Santa Monica College (1956); Utah (1957–1958)
- NFL draft: 1959: 1st round, 10th overall pick

Career history

Playing
- New York Giants (1959–1961); Minnesota Vikings (1962)*; New York Titans (1962); Saskatchewan Roughriders (1963); San Francisco 49ers (1964)*; Oakland Raiders (1964); Hartford Charter Oaks (1965–1966)
- * Offseason or practice squad member only

Coaching
- Hartford Charter Oaks (1965) Head coach

Awards and highlights
- First-team All-American (1957); NCAA passing yards leader (1957)

Career NFL/AFL statistics
- Passing attempts: 173
- Passing completions: 73
- Completion percentage: 42.2%
- TD–INT: 10–12
- Passing yards: 1,086
- Passer rating: 53.8
- Stats at Pro Football Reference

Clyde Lee Edward Grosscup (December 27, 1936 – June 1, 2020) was an American professional football player who was a quarterback in the National Football League (NFL). He played college football for the Washington Huskies and Utah Redskins and was selected by the New York Giants in the first round of the 1959 NFL draft.

He later became a sportscaster.

== Early life ==
Grosscup was born on December 27, 1936, in Santa Monica, California. He was raised in Santa Monica, and attended Santa Monica High School. In 1954, he was an All-American quarterback at Santa Monica High. He played high school football under coach Jim Sutherland.

== Collegiate career ==
Grosscup was a quarterback for the University of Washington in Seattle in 1955. However, there was a player revolt against heavy-handed head coach John Cherberg. Grosscup and three former high school teammates left the school shortly after their freshman season; deciding to sit out a year instead of continuing to play for the "tyrannical" Cherberg in Seattle. Cherberg, who was fired, had also revealed there was an alumni slush fund to pay players, which created a scandal. Years later, Grosscup revealed he had received $100/month from the fund, in addition to his scholarship.

Grosscup considered returning to Washington in 1956, to play under new coach Darrell Royal, but instead attended Santa Monica College for a year. He then transferred to the University of Utah in Salt Lake City in 1957, leading a passing offense under head coach Jack Curtice that was advanced for its time. Grosscup considered Curtice a genius in developing the passing game.

Monday Night Football broadcaster Al Michaels credits Grosscup for developing the shovel pass or "Utah pass," although Grosscup acknowledges that the play was used decades earlier in the 1920s.

Grosscup finished his junior season in 1957, completing 94 of 137 passes (68.6%, a collegiate record at the time), passing for 10 touchdowns and a nation-leading 1,398 yards. His 68.6% completion rate was a Utah school record until 2019, when broken by Tyler Huntley. He only threw two interceptions, also leading the nation. He had a 175.5 college quarterback passer rating.

He came to national prominence in 1957 with a 316-yard passing game against Army. He was named a first-team All-American by Look, the Newspaper Enterprise Association, the Williamson National Football Rating, and Today and finished tenth in the balloting for the Heisman Trophy, won by John David Crow of Texas A&M.

In 1958, Grosscup passed for 828 yards, three touchdowns, and a 54.8 completion percentage. A shoulder injury had hampered his senior season under first-year head coach Ray Nagel, but Grosscup was selected to play in the Senior Bowl in early 1959. He was first-team All-Skyline Conference in 1957 and 1958.

== Professional career ==
Selected by the New York Giants in the first round with the tenth overall pick in the 1959 NFL draft, Grosscup appeared in eight games in his two seasons with the Giants. The Giants were the Eastern champions in 1959 and 1961, but fell in both title games on the road (31–16 against the Baltimore Colts and 37–0 against the Green Bay Packers).

After being waived by the Giants, in August 1962, his contract was purchased for $100 by the second-year Minnesota Vikings, but he was cut before the beginning of the season. This allowed Grosscup to return to New York in September, this time with the New York Titans of the American Football League (later known as the New York Jets), in its third season. He began the season as the starter, but missed six weeks with a knee injury. Grosscup was cut on the final day of the 1963 preseason and signed with the Saskatchewan Roughriders of the Canadian Football League three days later. That same year, Grosscup released his first book, entitled Fourth and One.

After failing to make the San Francisco 49ers, Grosscup spent the 1964 season on the Oakland Raiders' taxi squad. He was cut by the Raiders the following season and signed with the Hartford Charter Oaks of the newly formed Continental Football League, and became a player-coach.

While skilled as a quarterback, Grosscup had the artistic temperament of a poet or writer, rather than the hard-bitten or violent temperament typically associated with professional football at the time. Before joining the NFL, he held a public written correspondence about football with a sportswriter. While popular generally, Grosscup came off as arrogant to his future Giants teammates, who originally isolated him when he joined the team and where he remained on the fringes of the team's players throughout his two years there.

Giants coach Allie Sherman disliked Grosscup as a player and a person; and during his short stint in Minnesota, Grosscup infuriated coach Norm Van Brocklin by using the word "deuce" instead of "two" when calling a play, Van Brocklin telling him to use numbers as he did not go for "Madison Avenue stuff". After that, the Vikings players called Grosscup, Deuce or Madison.

== Broadcasting career ==
After the 1966 season, Grosscup began a career in broadcasting. He spent one season calling AFL games for NBC before beginning a twenty-year stint as a college football analyst for ABC, working alongside notable voices such as Bill Flemming, Chris Schenkel, Keith Jackson, Verne Lundquist, Al Michaels, and Curt Gowdy.

Grosscup was also a broadcaster in the USFL, first as a radio analyst for the Oakland Invaders, then as a television analyst on ABC from 1984–1985 or 1982–1985.

Grosscup was the radio analyst for the Sacramento Gold Miners of the CFL during the 1993 and 1994 seasons.

Grosscup was a voter in the Harris Interactive College Football Poll.

=== California Golden Bears ===
Grosscup was a member of the California Golden Bears broadcast team for 32 years, including 17 years as a color analyst and 15 years as part of the team's postgame coverage.

From 1986 to 2003, Grosscup was the radio analyst for broadcasts alongside Joe Starkey. Former Cal quarterback Mike Pawlawski took over as radio analyst in 2004 despite Grosscup's willingness to continue until 2007. Grosscup hosted the postgame radio show for Cal football games from 2004 until his retirement in 2018.

== Death ==
Grosscup died on June 1, 2020, at the age of 83.

== See also ==
- List of American Football League players
