= List of UCLA Bruins men's basketball head coaches =

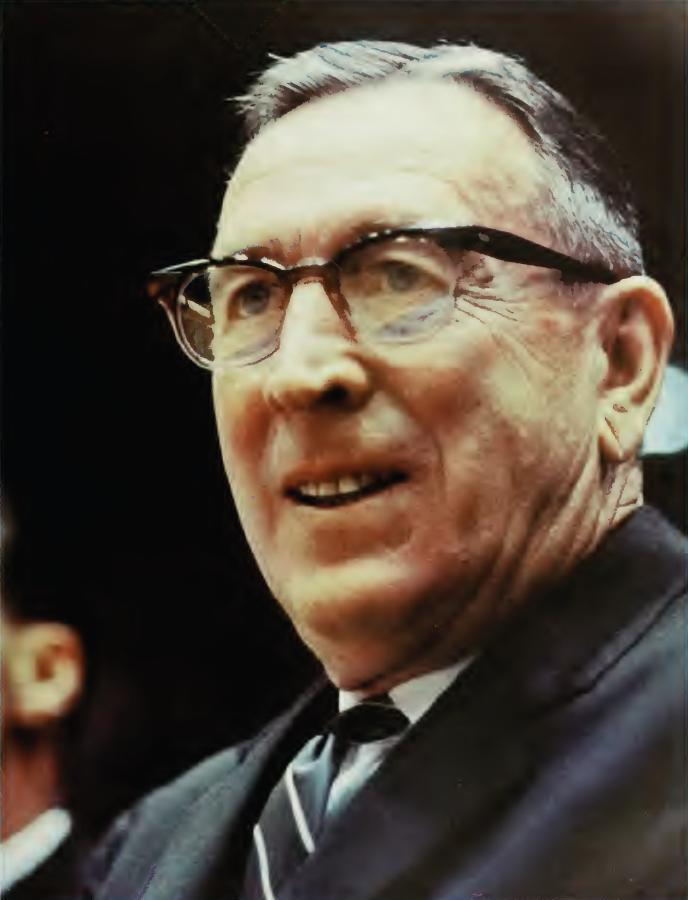
John Wooden led the team to 10 of its 11 national titles.

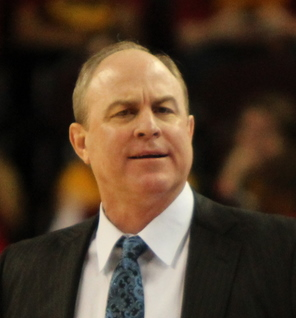
Former coach Ben Howland compiled the second most victories in school history.

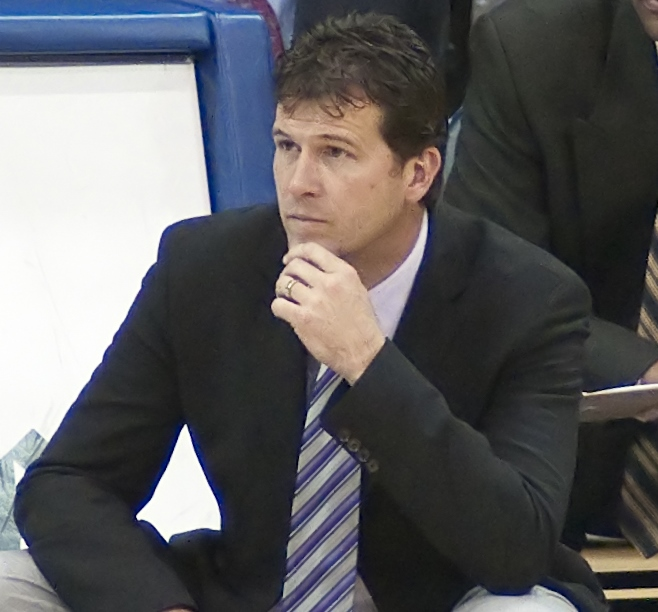
Former coach Steve Alford

The men's college basketball program of the University of California, Los Angeles (UCLA) was founded in 1919 and is known competitively as the UCLA Bruins. The team has had 13 head coaches in its history, and they have won 11 National Collegiate Athletic Association (NCAA) Men's Division I Basketball Championships, the most of any school. John Wooden won 10 national championships between 1964 and 1975, and Jim Harrick won the other in 1995. The New York Times wrote that Wooden "made UCLA the most successful team in college basketball." After Wooden retired, the four coaches that succeeded him resigned, and the following three—Harrick included—were fired. The average tenure of those coaches after Wooden was four years. (Note: There were 28 seasons from 1975–76 to 2002–03 and 7 coaches, an average of 4 years. The Yahoo article said 3.9.) Ben Howland, led the Bruins to three consecutive Final Four appearances from 2006 to 2008.

Years	Duration of head coaching career at UCLA
Won	Number of games won at UCLA
Lost	Number of games lost at UCLA
%	Percentage of games won at UCLA
*	Elected to the Naismith Memorial Basketball Hall of Fame as a coach

Statistics updated through 2019–20 season

Head Coach	Years	Won	Lost	%	Ref
Fred Cozens	1919–1921	20	4	.833	
Caddy Works	1921–1939	173	159	.521	
Wilbur Johns	1939–1948	93	120	.437	
John Wooden*	1948–1975	620	147	.808	
Gene Bartow	1975–1977	52	9	.852	
Gary Cunningham	1977–1979	50	8	.862	
Larry Brown*	1979–1981	42	17	.712	
Larry Farmer	1981–1984	61	23	.726	
Walt Hazzard	1984–1988	77	47	.621	
Jim Harrick	1988–1996	192	62	.756	
Steve Lavin	1996–2003	145	78	.650	
Ben Howland	2003–2013	233	107	.685	
Steve Alford	2013–2018	124	63	.663	
Murry Bartow (interim)	2018–2019	10	10	.500	
Mick Cronin	2019–present	137	62	.688	
