= 1958 Wyoming Cowboys football team =

American college football season

1958 Wyoming Cowboys football

Skyline champion Sun Bowl champion

Sun Bowl, W 14–6 vs. Hardin–Simmons
- Conference: Skyline Conference
- Record: 8–3 (6–1 Skyline)
- Head coach: Bob Devaney (2nd season)
- Captain: Dale Memmelaar
- Home stadium: War Memorial Stadium

1958 Skyline Conference football standings
	Conf.					Overall
Team	W		L		T	W		L		T
Wyoming $	6	–	1	–	0	8	–	3	–	0
New Mexico	5	–	1	–	0	7	–	3	–	0
BYU	5	–	2	–	0	6	–	4	–	0
Colorado State	4	–	3	–	0	6	–	4	–	0
Utah	3	–	3	–	0	4	–	7	–	0
Utah State	2	–	5	–	0	3	–	7	–	0
Denver	2	–	5	–	0	2	–	8	–	0
Montana	0	–	7	–	0	0	–	10	–	0
$ – Conference champion

The 1958 Wyoming Cowboys football team was an American football team that represented the University of Wyoming as a member of the Skyline Conference during the 1958 college football season. In their second year under head coach Bob Devaney, the Cowboys compiled an 8–3 record (6–1 against Skyline opponents), won the Skyline Conference championship, won the Sun Bowl over Hardin–Simmons, and outscored opponents by a total of 205 to 136. They played their home games at War Memorial Stadium in Laramie, Wyoming.

Utah was defeated in Laramie on November 1, in what was Wyoming's last home game in the month of November for over two decades, until 1979.

== Schedule ==
Date	Opponent	Site	Result	Attendance	Source
September 20	at Kansas State*	Memorial Stadium; Manhattan, KS	L 14–17	12,000	
September 27	vs. Montana	Daylis Stadium; Billings, MT (Midland Roundtable Grid Classic)	W 21–14	8,200	
October 4	Denver	War Memorial Stadium; Laramie, WY	W 15–12	15,680	
October 11	Oregon State*	War Memorial Stadium; Laramie, WY	W 28–0	12,580	
October 18	at Colorado State	Colorado Field; Fort Collins, CO (rivalry)	W 7–6	12,000	
October 25	New Mexico	War Memorial Stadium; Laramie, WY	L 12–13	12,000	
November 1	Utah	War Memorial Stadium; Laramie, WY	W 25–20	8,562	
November 8	at Utah State	Romney Stadium; Logan, UT (rivalry)	W 41–13	3,815	
November 15	at No. 10 Air Force*	Washburn Field; Colorado Springs, CO	L 6–21	12,783–13,000	
November 22	at BYU	Cougar Stadium; Provo, UT	W 22–14	13,368	
December 31	vs. Hardin–Simmons*	Kidd Field; El Paso, TX (Sun Bowl)	W 14–6	12,000–13,000	
*Non-conference game; Rankings from AP Poll released prior to the game

== 1958 team players in the NFL ==
The following were selected in the 1959 NFL draft.

Player	Position	Round	Overall	NFL Team
Bob Sawyer	Back	11	131	New York Giants
Dale Memmelaar	Guard	21	242	St. Louis Cardinals
