= Red Sanders =

American football player and coach (1905–1958)

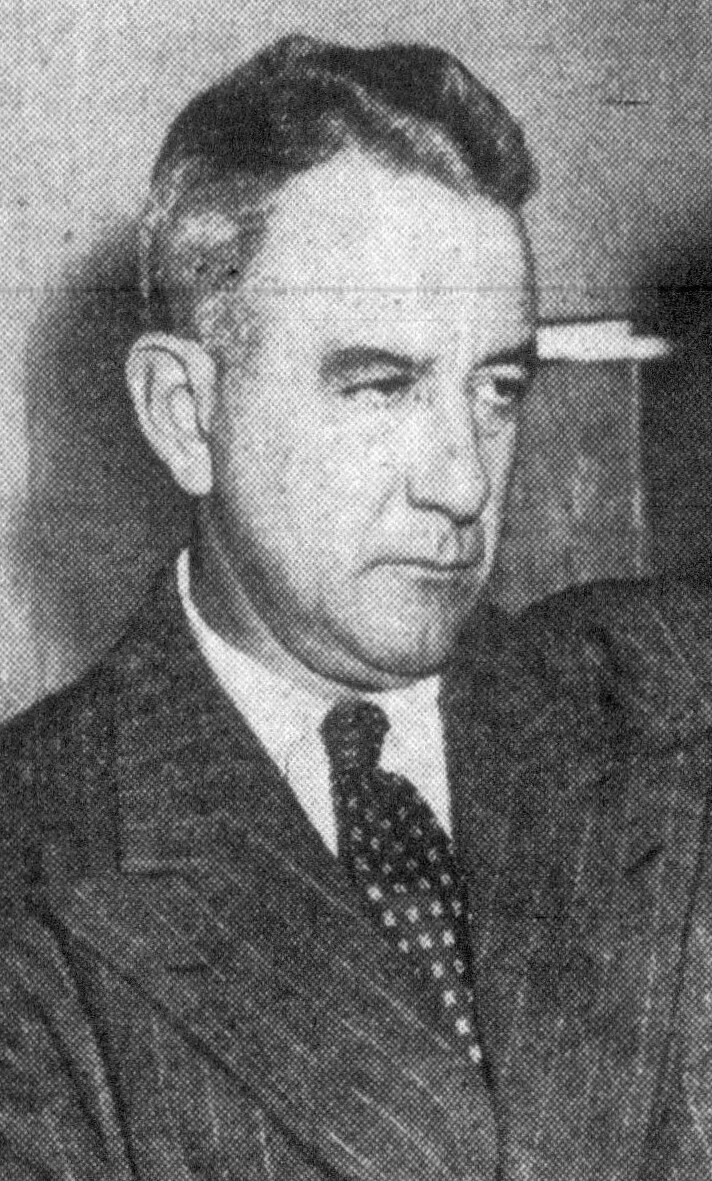
- Sanders, circa 1950

Biographical details
- Born: May 7, 1905; Asheville, North Carolina, U.S.
- Died: August 14, 1958 (aged 53); Los Angeles, California, U.S.
- Education: Vanderbilt University

Playing career
- 1924–1926: Vanderbilt
- Position: Quarterback

Coaching career (HC unless noted)
- 1927–1930: Clemson (assistant)
- 1934–1937: Riverside Military Academy
- 1938: Florida (assistant)
- 1939: LSU (assistant)
- 1940–1942: Vanderbilt
- 1946–1948: Vanderbilt
- 1949–1957: UCLA

Administrative career (AD unless noted)
- 1945–1949: Vanderbilt

Head coaching record
- Overall: 102–41–3 (college)
- Bowls: 0–2

Accomplishments and honors

Championships
- 1 National (1954); 3 PCC (1953–1955)

Awards
- AFCA Coach of the Year (1954)
- College Football Hall of Fame; Inducted in 1996 (profile)

Henry Russell "Red" Sanders (May 7, 1905 – August 14, 1958) was an American college football player and coach. He was head football coach at Vanderbilt University (1940–1942, 1946–1948) and the University of California, Los Angeles (1949–1957), compiling a career college football head coaching record of 102–41–3 (.709). Sanders' 1954 UCLA team was named national champions by the Coaches Poll and the Football Writers Association of America. Sanders was inducted into the College Football Hall of Fame as a coach in 1996.

Known for being witty and hard driving, Sanders used the single-wing formation at Vanderbilt and UCLA. He was the originator of the squib kick and the 4–4 defense. He is widely credited with coining the saying, "Winning isn't everything; it's the only thing". When asked about the UCLA–USC rivalry, Sanders said "it's not a matter of life and death, it's more important than that!" He was the first "Wizard of Westwood" before that title was attributed to UCLA basketball coach John Wooden.

== Childhood ==
Born in Asheville, North Carolina, Sanders spent most of his youth in Nashville, Tennessee. One of his best boyhood friends and classmates at Duncan School was renowned sports writer Fred Russell, with whom he remained close friends his entire life. Sanders also attended Central High School in Nashville and graduated from Riverside Military Academy in Gainesville, Georgia.

== Vanderbilt player ==
Sanders attended college at Vanderbilt University in Nashville. He was a four-year letterman both in football and baseball. Sanders was captain of the baseball team in his senior year and a substitute quarterback on the football team. His football coach, Dan McGugin, said of him, "Red Sanders has one of the best football minds I have ever known."

== Early coaching career ==
Josh Cody first hired Sanders as the backfield coach of the Clemson Tigers. Sanders got his first head coaching position at Riverside Military Academy, leading its 1936 team to an undefeated season. The father of Bucky Curtis hired Sanders for the job. Sanders then assisted the 1938 Florida Gators, again with Cody, and the 1939 LSU Tigers.

== Vanderbilt coach ==
Sanders had two stints as head coach of the Vanderbilt Commodores, from 1940 to 1942, and then from 1946 to 1948. Between 1942 and 1946, Sanders served in the United States Navy during World War II. He had a successful career at Vanderbilt, compiling a 36–22–2 (.617) record, the best mark by a coach while the school has been a member of the Southeastern Conference. Highlights included:

- A stunning upset of #7 ranked Alabama on November 22, 1941, in a driving rainstorm in Nashville; up to that time, only the second time in Commodore history that they defeated a ranked team.
- The first top-20 ranking in the school history in 1947, where the team was ranked #10 after opening the season with two wins. The team defended its ranking with a defeat of #18 Mississippi, the first time Vanderbilt played a ranked school while ranked.
- An eight-game winning streak to end the 1948 season, including a ranking in the final poll and a defeat of archrival Tennessee. This still stands as the second longest single-season win streak in Vanderbilt football history.

== UCLA ==
Sanders coached the UCLA Bruins from 1949 through 1957. He was indisputably the best football coach in school history, elevating a rarely distinguished program to an elite national power with an overall record of 66–19–1 (.773) at UCLA and earning the school its only national championship in football in 1954. As head coach of the Bruins, Sanders led them to four Top 10 national rankings, three Pacific Coast Conference (PCC) titles, two Rose Bowls (1953 and 1955 seasons), and a 6–3 record over arch-rival USC.

Technically, UCLA should have played in three straight Rose Bowls from 1953 to 1955, but the PCC's recent "no-repeat" rule denied UCLA's best team, and one of the finest in college football history (leading the country in both offense and defense) from confronting an undefeated Ohio State in the Rose Bowl to unify the national championship on the field. The 1954 Bruins and 1957 Oregon State Beavers were the only PCC teams impacted by the rule, which went into effect after California lost its third consecutive Rose Bowl in January 1951.

Sanders instituted the distinctive football uniforms worn by the Bruins when he replaced the navy blue jerseys with "powderkeg blue", added the shoulder stripe to give the impression of motion, and changed the number style from block to clarendon. Sanders said these changes also made it harder for opponents to scout his Bruins on the grainy black and white game films of the time.

The 1954 Bruins compiled a 9–0 record and climbed to the top of the Coaches Poll, sharing the national championship with Ohio State, winner of the AP Poll's title. Due to the PCC's early "no repeat" rule, the undefeated Bruins were unable to compete in the Rose Bowl that season despite being the PCC champion. Second-place USC, which the Bruins defeated 34–0, played in the 1955 Rose Bowl instead and lost 20–7 to Big Ten Conference champion and eventual co-national champion Ohio State.

== Television appearances ==
Sanders appeared as a contestant on the November 18, 1954 episode of the television quiz program You Bet Your Life, hosted by Groucho Marx. He appeared on The Jack Benny Program "New Years Day" 1956 episode on Sunday, January 1, 1956, preceding the 1956 Rose Bowl to be played the next day.

== Death ==
Shortly before the 1958 season, Sanders died suddenly of a heart attack in a Los Angeles hotel room on August 14. His companion was a convicted prostitute, Ernestine Drake, described as a "blonde woman." The room was registered in the name of his friend, W.T. "Pop" Grimes, who had a record of arrests for pandering and had served prison time at San Quentin. Sanders had complained of the heat, and asked Grimes to fetch some soft drinks. He then began gasping for breath and clutching his chest. He died on the floor. His last words to Drake were, "Football is a great game. You should come out this fall and see a few games." Los Angeles coroner Theodore Curphey said Sanders' heart weighed 500 grams, whereas the normal size for an inactive male is 300–400 grams, meaning that Sanders suffered from an enlarged heart.

Sanders' assistant George W. Dickerson succeeded him on an interim basis for the first three games of the Bruins' 1958 season, before suffering a nervous breakdown. He was succeeded by assistant Bill Barnes, who led UCLA to a 31–34–3 (.478) record in seven seasons (1958–1964).

== Personal life ==
Sanders was a Commander in the U.S. Navy during his service in World War II. At the end of the war, he met and married the former Anna "Ann" Daniel, of Lakeland, Florida. Ann was a graduate of Florida State University and a holder of a master's degree from the University of North Carolina. Ann died on November 23, 1999.

== Quotes ==
=== Winning isn't every thing, it's the only thing ===
Sanders actually spoke two different versions of the quote. In 1950, at a Cal Poly San Luis Obispo physical education workshop, Sanders told his group: "Men, I'll be honest. Winning isn't everything. (Long pause.) Men, it's the only thing!" In 1955, in a Sports Illustrated article preceding the 1956 Rose Bowl, he was quoted as saying "Sure, winning isn't every thing, It's the only thing." The quote has since been erroneously attributed to Vince Lombardi as the originator.

=== Beating 'SC is not a matter of life or death, It's more important than that ===
While at UCLA, another famous quote was attributed to Sanders regarding the UCLA–USC rivalry, "Beating 'SC is not a matter of life or death, it's more important than that."

== Personal awards ==
- 1946 Blue-Gray Game, Montgomery, Alabama, Coach
- 1951 East–West Shrine Game, San Francisco, Coach
- 1952 College All-Star Game, Chicago, Coach
- 1952 North–South Shrine Game, Miami, Coach
- 1953, 1954, and 1957 Football Coach of the Year – Los Angeles Times National Sports Awards Dinner
- 1954 Coach of the Year – National Collegiate Football Coaches' Association and the Touchdown Club of Washington, D.C.
- 1959 Bronze plaque at the Los Angeles Coliseum
- 1984 UCLA Athletics Hall of Fame (Charter Member)
- 1994 Rose Bowl Hall of Fame
- 1996 College Football Hall of Fame

== Head coaching record ==
=== College ===
Year	Team	Overall	Conference	Standing	Bowl/playoffs	Coaches^{#}	AP^{°}
Vanderbilt Commodores (Southeastern Conference) (1940–1942)
1940	Vanderbilt	3–6–1	0–5–1	11th			
1941	Vanderbilt	8–2	3–2	6th			
1942	Vanderbilt	6–4	2–4	8th			
Vanderbilt Commodores (Southeastern Conference) (1946–1948)
1946	Vanderbilt	5–4	3–4	7th			
1947	Vanderbilt	6–4	3–3	5th			
1948	Vanderbilt	8–2–1	4–2–1	4th			12
Vanderbilt:		36–22–2	15–20–2				
UCLA Bruins (Pacific Coast Conference) (1949–1957)
1949	UCLA	6–3	5–2	2nd			
1950	UCLA	6–3	5–2	3rd			
1951	UCLA	5–3–1	4–1–1	2nd		17	17
1952	UCLA	8–1	5–1	2nd		6	6
1953	UCLA	8–2	6–1	1st	L Rose	4	5
1954	UCLA	9–0	6–0	1st		1	2
1955	UCLA	9–2	6–0	1st	L Rose	4	4
1956	UCLA	7–3	5–2	T–2nd			
1957	UCLA	8–2	5–2	3rd		18	
UCLA:		66–19–1	47–11–1				
Total:		102–41–3					
National championship Conference title Conference division title or championship game berth
^{#}Rankings from final Coaches Poll.; ^{°}Rankings from final AP Poll.

== Bibliography ==
- Adam Karon, Red Scare, The Daily Bruin, January 20, 2000.
- Milestones, Time, August 25, 1958.
- UCLA Bruins football media guide (PDF copy available at www.uclabruins.com)
- Vanderbilt Commodores football media guide (PDF copy available at www.vucommodores.com)
- Rose, Adam – August 14, 1958: The saddest date in UCLA football history. Los Angeles Times Blogs, "What's Bruin?", August 13, 2007
