= 1958 California Golden Bears football team =

American college football season

1958 California Golden Bears football
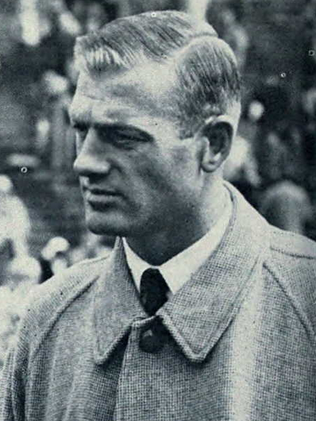
- Coach Pete Elliott

PCC champion

Rose Bowl, L 12–38 vs. Iowa
- Conference: Pacific Coast Conference

Ranking
- Coaches: No. 16
- AP: No. 16
- Record: 7–4 (6–1 PCC)
- Head coach: Pete Elliott (2nd season)
- Captains: Jack Hart; Joe Kapp
- Home stadium: California Memorial Stadium

1958 Pacific Coast Conference football standings
	Conf.					Overall
Team	W		L		T	W		L		T
No. 16 California $	6	–	1	–	0	7	–	4	–	0
Washington State	6	–	2	–	0	7	–	3	–	0
USC	4	–	2	–	1	4	–	5	–	1
Oregon State	5	–	3	–	0	6	–	4	–	0
Oregon	4	–	4	–	0	4	–	6	–	0
UCLA	2	–	4	–	1	3	–	6	–	1
Stanford	2	–	5	–	0	2	–	8	–	0
Washington	1	–	6	–	0	3	–	7	–	0
Idaho	0	–	3	–	0	4	–	5	–	0
$ – Conference champion; Rankings from AP poll

The 1958 California Golden Bears football team was an American football team that represented the University of California, Berkeley in the Pacific Coast Conference (PCC) during the 1958 college football season. In their second year under head coach Pete Elliott, the Golden Bears compiled a 7–4 record (6–1 in PCC, first), lost to Iowa in the Rose Bowl, and outscored their opponents 207 to 200. Home games were played on campus at California Memorial Stadium in Berkeley, California.

California's statistical leaders on offense were quarterback Joe Kapp with 649 passing yards and 582 rushing yards, and Jack Hart with 334 receiving yards. Kapp and Hart were also the team's co-captains; Kapp was later inducted into the College Football Hall of Fame.

Through 2024, this remains California's most recent Rose Bowl appearance.

== Schedule ==
Date	Opponent	Rank	Site	Result	Attendance	Source
September 20	Pacific (CA)*		California Memorial Stadium; Berkeley, CA	L 20–24	40,000	
September 27	at No. 4 Michigan State*		Spartan Stadium; East Lansing, MI	L 12–32	52,639	
October 4	Washington State		California Memorial Stadium; Berkeley, CA	W 34–14	25,000	
October 11	Utah*		California Memorial Stadium; Berkeley, CA	W 36–21	28,000	
October 18	at USC		Los Angeles Memorial Coliseum; Los Angeles, CA	W 14–12	34,872	
October 25	Oregon		California Memorial Stadium; Berkeley, CA	W 23–6	47,000	
November 1	at Oregon State		Parker Stadium; Corvallis, OR	L 8–14	20,668	
November 8	UCLA		California Memorial Stadium; Berkeley, CA (rivalry)	W 20–17	50,000	
November 15	at Washington		Husky Stadium; Seattle, WA	W 12–7	29,500	
November 22	Stanford	No. 19	California Memorial Stadium; Berkeley, CA (Big Game)	W 16–15	81,490	
January 1, 1959	vs. No. 2 Iowa*	No. 16	Rose Bowl; Pasadena, CA (Rose Bowl)	L 12–38	98,297	
*Non-conference game; Rankings from AP Poll released prior to the game; Source:

== Game summaries ==
=== Stanford ===
Stanford at California

Team	1	2	3	4	Total
Stanford	6	3	0	6	15
• California	8	0	8	0	16

- Date: November 22
- Location: California Memorial Stadium, Berkeley, CA
- Game attendance: 81,490

Scoring summary
1		CAL	Jack Hart 1 yard run (Grover Garvin run)	CAL 8-0
1		STAN	Skip Face 3 yard run (pass failed)	CAL 8-6
2		STAN	Skip Face 18 yard field goal	STAN 9-8
3		CAL	Jack Hart 1 yard run (Joe Kapp to Wayne Crow pass)	CAL 16-9
4	1:30	STAN	Joel Freis 21 yard pass from Dick Norman (run failed)	CAL 16-15

Senior halfback Jack Hart scored two touchdowns and tackled Stanford's Skip Face on a two-point conversion with 1:30 remaining to give Cal the Pacific Coast Conference championship and a Rose Bowl berth.

== Roster ==
1958 California Golden Bears football team roster
Players
Coaches
Offense

Pos.	#	Name	Class
QB		Joe Kapp (C)	Sr
HB		Jack Hart (C)	Sr

Defense

Pos.	#	Name	Class

Special teams

Pos.	#	Name	Class

Head coach

- Pete Elliot (2nd year)

Coordinators/assistant coaches

Legend

- (C) Team captain
- (S) Suspended
- (I) Ineligible
- Injured
- Redshirt
