= 1958 Air Force Falcons football team =

American college football season

1958 Air Force Falcons football

Cotton Bowl Classic, T 0–0 vs. TCU
- Conference: Independent

Ranking
- Coaches: No. 8
- AP: No. 6
- Record: 9–0–2
- Head coach: Ben Martin (1st season)
- Captain: Brock Strom
- Home stadium: DU Stadium, Washburn Field

1958 Western major college football independents records
	Conf.			Overall
Team	W	L	T	W		L		T
No. 6 Air Force		–		9	–	0	–	2
Pacific (CA)		–		6	–	4	–	0
San Jose State		–		4	–	5	–	0
Rankings from AP poll

The 1958 Air Force Falcons football team represented the United States Air Force Academy as an independent during the 1958 college football season. The Falcons did not have an official stadium until Falcon Stadium opened in 1962, but played most of their home games at DU Stadium at the University of Denver.

They were led by first-year head coach Ben Martin and played the fourth season for the Air Force Falcons football program. The Falcons finished undefeated with a record of 9–0–2. They made their first AP and coaches poll appearances, as well as their first bowl appearance in the Cotton Bowl Classic against TCU, which ended in a scoreless tie.

Air Force did not play Army or Navy this season; Army was first played in 1959 and Navy in 1960.

== Schedule ==
Date	Time	Opponent	Rank	Site	TV	Result	Attendance	Source
September 26		at Detroit		University of Detroit Stadium; Detroit, MI		W 37–6	20,015	
October 4		at No. 8 Iowa		Iowa Stadium; Iowa City, IA		T 13–13	48,325	
October 11		Colorado State		DU Stadium; Denver, CO (rivalry)		W 36–6	17,479	
October 18		at Stanford		Stanford Stadium; Stanford, CA		W 16–0	40,000	
October 25		Utah	No. 14	DU Stadium; Denver, CO		W 16–14	11,647	
November 1		at Oklahoma State	No. 13	Lewis Field; Stillwater, OK		W 33–29	31,000	
November 8		at Denver	No. 10	DU Stadium; Denver, CO		W 10–7	18,047	
November 15		Wyoming	No. 10	Washburn Field; Colorado Springs, CO		W 21–6	12,783–13,000	
November 22		at New Mexico	No. 9	Zimmerman Field; Albuquerque, NM		W 45–7		
November 29		at Colorado	No. 8	Folsom Field; Boulder, CO		W 20–14	40,000	
January 1, 1959	1:30 p.m.	vs. No. 10 TCU	No. 6	Cotton Bowl; Dallas, TX (Cotton Bowl Classic)	CBS	T 0–0	75,504	
Rankings from AP Poll released prior to the game; All times are in Mountain time; Source:

== Roster ==
1958 Air Force Falcons football team roster
Players
Coaches
Offense

Pos.	#	Name	Class
E		Tom Jozwiak	Sr
OL		Brock Strom (C)	Sr

Defense

Pos.	#	Name	Class
DL		Dave Phillips	Sr
		George Pupich

Special teams

Pos.	#	Name	Class

Head coach

- Ben Martin (1st year)

Coordinators/assistant coaches

Legend

- (C) Team captain
- (S) Suspended
- (I) Ineligible
- Injured
- Redshirt
