= 1958 Sun Bowl (December) =

American college football game

- 25th Sun Bowl
| Hardin–Simmons Cowboys | Wyoming Cowboys |
| (6–4) | (7–3) |
| Border Conference | Mountain States |
| 6 | 14 |
| Head coach: Sammy Baugh | Head coach: Bob Devaney |
| | 1 | 2 | 3 | 4 | Total |
|---|---|---|---|---|---|
| Hardin–Simmons | 0 | 0 | 6 | 0 | 6 |
| Wyoming | 0 | 14 | 0 | 0 | 14 |
- Date: December 31, 1958
- Season: 1958
- Stadium: Kidd Field
- Location: El Paso, Texas
- MVP: Guard Leonard Kuczewski
- Referee: Curly Hays (Border; split crew: Border, Mountain States)
- Attendance: 12,000–13,000

The 1958 Sun Bowl (December) was a college football postseason bowl game between the Wyoming Cowboys and the Hardin–Simmons Cowboys. This was the 25th Sun Bowl, and the first edition to be held in December; all prior Sun Bowls had been played on January 1 or January 2.

== Background ==
Wyoming was champion of the Mountain States Conference for the third time in the 1950s and Hardin–Simmons was champion of the Border Conference for the third time in 16 years.

== Game summary ==
Though both teams were stingy on defense, two turnovers in the second quarter led to Hardin–Simmons' downfall. Pete Hart fumbled the ball and Wyoming's Pat Smyth recovered on the 19 of Hardin. Two plays later, Bud Snyder ran for 22 yards to the end zone to give Wyoming a 7–0 lead. After the kickoff, Hardin–Simmons was at their own 21 yard line. After a seven-yard loss on the first play, an interception of Harold Stephens' pass by Leonard Kuczewski led to another Snyder touchdown run. Stephens cut the lead on a touchdown pass to Benji, but after the failed conversion attempt, Hardin–Simmons failed to reach the end zone after that. Though Wyoming was limited to 188 total yards compared to Hardin-Simmons' 235 yards of total offense, Wyoming forced four turnovers while Hardin-Simmons failed to utilize their rushing attack for more points.

== Aftermath ==
Wyoming won three more conference titles, but was not invited to any more bowl games during the rest of Devaney's tenure. This was the last bowl game for Hardin–Simmons.
