= 1958 Oregon State Beavers football team =

American college football season

1958 Oregon State Beavers football
- 1958 OSC football media guide
- Conference: Pacific Coast Conference
- Record: 6–4 (5–3 PCC)
- Head coach: Tommy Prothro (4th season)
- Home stadium: Parker Stadium; Multnomah Stadium

1958 Pacific Coast Conference football standings
	Conf.					Overall
Team	W		L		T	W		L		T
No. 16 California $	6	–	1	–	0	7	–	4	–	0
Washington State	6	–	2	–	0	7	–	3	–	0
USC	4	–	2	–	1	4	–	5	–	1
Oregon State	5	–	3	–	0	6	–	4	–	0
Oregon	4	–	4	–	0	4	–	6	–	0
UCLA	2	–	4	–	1	3	–	6	–	1
Stanford	2	–	5	–	0	2	–	8	–	0
Washington	1	–	6	–	0	3	–	7	–	0
Idaho	0	–	3	–	0	4	–	5	–	0
$ – Conference champion; Rankings from AP poll

The 1958 Oregon State Beavers football team represented Oregon State College in the Pacific Coast Conference (PCC) during the 1958 college football season. In their fourth season under head coach Tommy Prothro, the Beavers compiled a 6–4 record (5–3 in PCC, fourth), and were outscored 98 to 118. They played three home games on campus at Parker Stadium in Corvallis and two at Multnomah Stadium in Portland.

This was the final football season in the PCC, which disbanded the following spring; Oregon State was an independent for the next five seasons.

== Schedule ==
Date	Opponent	Rank	Site	Result	Attendance	Source
September 19	at USC	No. 12	Los Angeles Memorial Coliseum; Los Angeles, CA	L 0–21	40,286	
September 27	Kansas*		Multnomah Stadium; Portland, OR	W 12–0	28,115	
October 4	UCLA		Parker Stadium; Corvallis, OR	W 14–0	18,532	
October 11	at Wyoming*		War Memorial Stadium; Laramie, WY	L 0–28	12,580	
October 18	at Idaho		Neale Stadium; Moscow, ID	W 20–6	8,618	
October 25	Washington		Multnomah Stadium; Portland, OR	W 14–12	29,057	
November 1	California		Parker Stadium; Corvallis, OR	W 14–8	20,668	
November 8	at Washington State		Rogers Field; Pullman, WA	L 0–7	17,500	
November 15	at Stanford		Stanford Stadium; Stanford, CA	W 24–16	22,500	
November 22	Oregon		Parker Stadium; Corvallis, OR (Civil War)	L 0–20	27,574	
*Non-conference game; Rankings from AP Poll released prior to the game; Source:
