= 1959 Rose Bowl =

American college football game

- 45th Rose Bowl Game
| Iowa Hawkeyes | California Golden Bears |
| (7–1–1) | (7–3) |
| Big Ten | PCC |
| 38 | 12 |
| Head coach: Forest Evashevski | Head coach: Pete Elliott |
| AP / Coaches; 2 / 2 | AP / Coaches; 16 / 16 |
| | 1 | 2 | 3 | 4 | Total |
|---|---|---|---|---|---|
| Iowa | 7 | 13 | 12 | 6 | 38 |
| California | 0 | 0 | 6 | 6 | 12 |
- Date: January 1, 1959
- Season: 1958
- Stadium: Rose Bowl
- Location: Pasadena, California
- MVP: Bob Jeter (Iowa HB)
- Favorite: Iowa by 18 points
- Referee: Jack Sprenger (Pacific Coast; split crew: Pacific Coast, Big Ten)
- Halftime show: Hawkeye Marching Band, University of California Marching Band
- Attendance: 98,297

United States TV coverage
- Network: NBC
- Announcers: Mel Allen and Chick Hearn

The 1959 Rose Bowl was the 45th edition of the college football bowl game, played at the Rose Bowl in Pasadena, California, on Thursday, January 1. The heavily-favored and second-ranked Iowa Hawkeyes of the Big Ten Conference defeated the #16 California Golden Bears of the Pacific Coast Conference, 38–12. Iowa's star halfback Bob Jeter was named the Player of the Game. Iowa improved to 8–1–1 and California fell to 7–4 for the season.

Iowa, 7–1–1, was behind undefeated LSU in the two major polls. LSU was ranked No. 1 in both major polls since week 6 of the season, and was awarded the national championship by the Associated Press (AP) and the Coaches' Poll (UPI). Iowa finished first in the Football Writers Association of America (FWAA) poll.

Future Berkeley, California city mayor Tom Bates was a member of the California Golden Bears team.

It was the sixth straight Rose Bowl win for the Big Ten, and the twelfth of the last thirteen. The PCC disbanded in the spring and five of its members formed the new AAWU (Big Five), while the other four competed as independents for several years. It is the last time Cal has appeared in the Rose Bowl.

== Teams ==
=== Iowa Hawkeyes ===
Second-ranked Iowa were the Big Ten champions, entered the game with a record of 7–1–1 (5–1 Big Ten), and were favored by eighteen points.

=== California Golden Bears ===
Sixteenth-ranked California, led by quarterback Joe Kapp, entered the game as Pacific Coast Conference champions with a record of 7–3 (6–1 PCC).

== Game summary ==
Randy Duncan helped Iowa take a 14–0 lead with a touchdown run in the first quarter and a touchdown pass to Jeff Langston in the second quarter. The Hawkeye backfield carried Iowa the rest of the way, as Willie Fleming ran for two touchdowns and Bob Jeter, the Rose Bowl Most Valuable Player, and Don Horn each ran for one touchdown. Iowa attempted a Rose Bowl record three two-point conversions and failed on all three, while Bob Prescott made one of two extra points. End Jack Hart scored all of California's twelve points, running for a touchdown in the third quarter and catching a touchdown in the fourth quarter, both of which were followed by failed two-point conversion attempts. Iowa broke four Rose Bowl records: longest run (Jeter 81), team rushing yards (429), team total yards (516) and individual rushing yards (Jeter 194); and tied another Rose Bowl record set by Georgia in 1943: first downs (24). The attendance was 98,297.

Four Rose Bowl game records were set: Jeter's 81-yard run, his 194 yards of rushing offense, the 429 yards gained on the ground and the 516 yards of total offense.

== Scoring ==
=== First quarter ===
- Iowa - Randy Duncan 2 yard run (Bob Prescott kick) (7–0, Iowa)

=== Second quarter ===
- Iowa - Jeff Langston 7 pass from Duncan (Prescott kick) (14–0, Iowa)
- Iowa - Don Horn 4 yard run (kick failed) (20–0, Iowa)

=== Third quarter ===
- Cal - Jack Hart 1 yard run (pass failed) (20–6, Iowa)
- Iowa - Willie Fleming 37 yard run (pass failed) (26–6, Iowa)
- Iowa - Bob Jeter 81 yard run* (pass failed) (32–6, Iowa)

=== Fourth quarter ===
- Iowa - Fleming 7 yard run (pass failed) (38–6, Iowa)
- Cal - Hart 17 pass from Joe Kapp (run failed) (38–12, Iowa)
