= LSU Tigers and Lady Tigers =

Athletic program of Louisiana State University

- University: Louisiana State University
- Nickname: Tigers, Lady Tigers, Fighting Tigers, Bayou Bengals
- NCAA: Division I (FBS)
- Conference: Southeastern Conference (primary); MPSF (beach volleyball)
- Athletic director: Verge Ausberry
- Location: Baton Rouge, Louisiana, United States
- Varsity teams: 21
- Football stadium: Tiger Stadium
- Basketball arena: Pete Maravich Assembly Center
- Baseball stadium: Alex Box Stadium, Skip Bertman Field
- Softball stadium: Tiger Park
- Soccer stadium: LSU Soccer Stadium
- Aquatics center: LSU Natatorium
- Volleyball arena: Pete Maravich Assembly Center
- Other venues: Bernie Moore Track Stadium; Carl Maddox Field House; Highland Road Park; LSU Beach Volleyball Stadium; LSU Tennis Complex; University Club of Baton Rouge
- Colors: Purple and gold
- Mascot: Mike the Tiger
- Fight song: Fight for LSU
- Website: lsusports.net

Team NCAA championships
- 53

SEC logo in LSU's colors

The LSU Tigers and Lady Tigers (also known as the Fighting Tigers) are the athletic teams representing Louisiana State University (LSU), a state university located in Baton Rouge, Louisiana, United States. LSU competes in Division I of the National Collegiate Athletic Association (NCAA) as a member of the Southeastern Conference (SEC).

== Nickname ==
The Louisiana State University official team nickname is the "Fighting Tigers", "Tigers" or "Lady Tigers".

At one time, the "Lady Tigers" nickname was used only in sports that have teams for both men and women—specifically basketball, cross country, golf, swimming and diving, tennis, and track and field (indoor and outdoor); however, since 2017, only women's basketball, cross country, and track and field use the "Lady Tigers" moniker.

== Sports sponsored ==
Men's sports	Women's sports
Baseball	Basketball
Basketball	Beach volleyball
Cross country	Cross country
Football	Golf
Golf	Gymnastics
Swimming and diving	Soccer
Tennis	Softball
Track and field^{†}	Swimming and diving
	Tennis
	Track and field^{†}
	Volleyball
† – Track and field includes both indoor and outdoor

With LSU primarily competing in the Southeastern Conference and the women's beach volleyball program competing in the Coastal Collegiate Sports Association, LSU sponsors teams in nine men's and twelve women's NCAA sanctioned sports.

By winning the SEC championship in men's basketball for the 2008–2009 season, LSU became the first SEC school to win at least 10 SEC championships in each of the big three sports of football, men's basketball, and baseball. LSU was the first SEC school to win at least one national championship in each of the big three sports.

=== Baseball ===
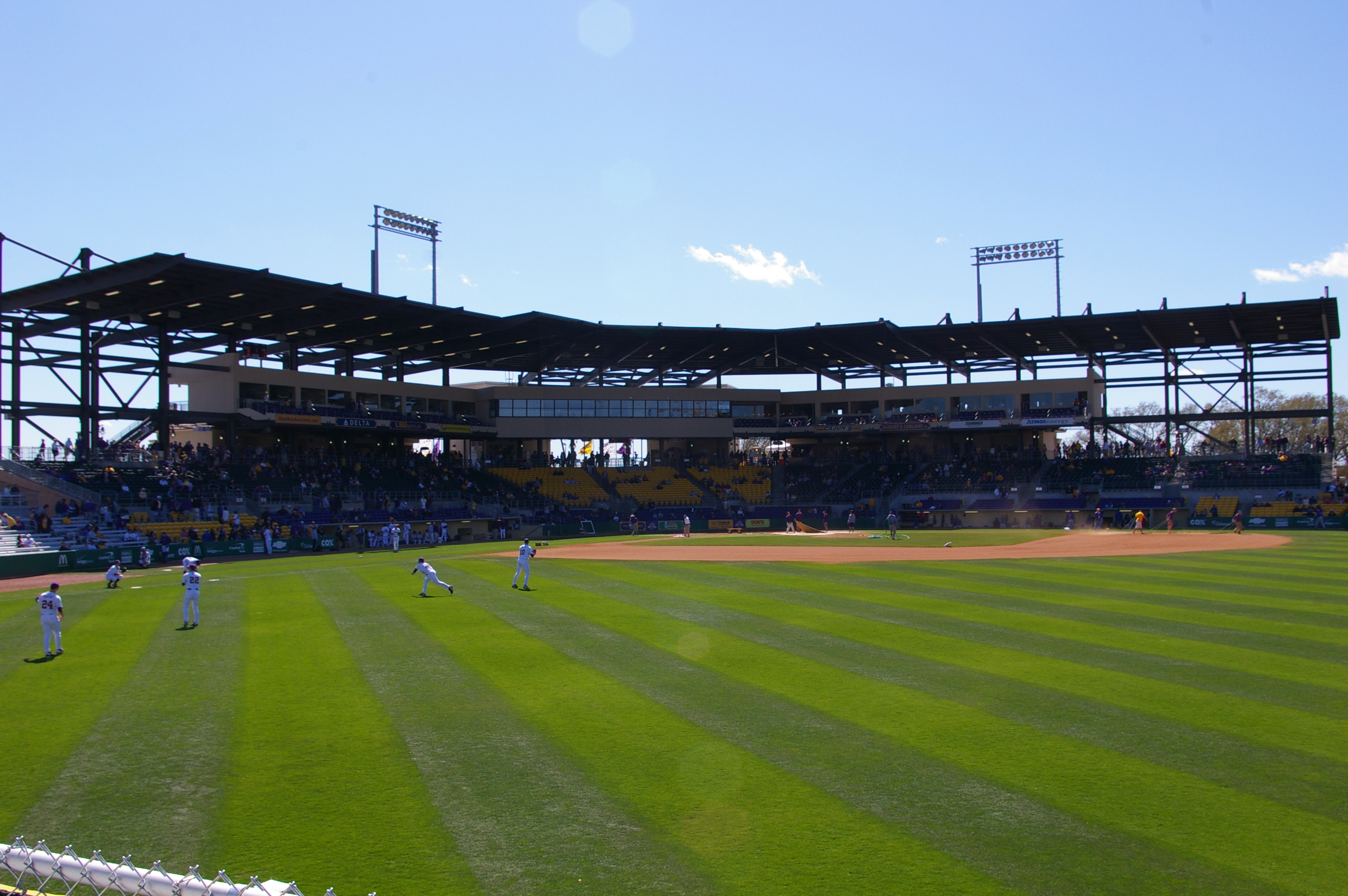
Alex Box Stadium, Skip Bertman Field

The LSU baseball team has won eight national championships since 1991. The team participates in the Western division of the Southeastern Conference and is currently coached by Jay Johnson. They play home games at Alex Box Stadium, Skip Bertman Field.

- National Championships (8): 1991, 1993, 1996, 1997, 2000, 2009, 2023, 2025
- CWS appearances (20): 1986, 1987, 1989, 1990, 1991, 1993, 1994, 1996, 1997, 1998, 2000, 2003, 2004, 2008, 2009, 2013, 2015, 2017, 2023,2025
- SEC Championships (17): 1939, 1943, 1946, 1961, 1975, 1986, 1990, 1991, 1992, 1993, 1996, 1997, 2003, 2009, 2012, 2015, 2017
- Conference Tournament Championships (12): 1986, 1990, 1992, 1993, 1994, 2000, 2008, 2009, 2010, 2013, 2014, 2017

=== Men's basketball ===
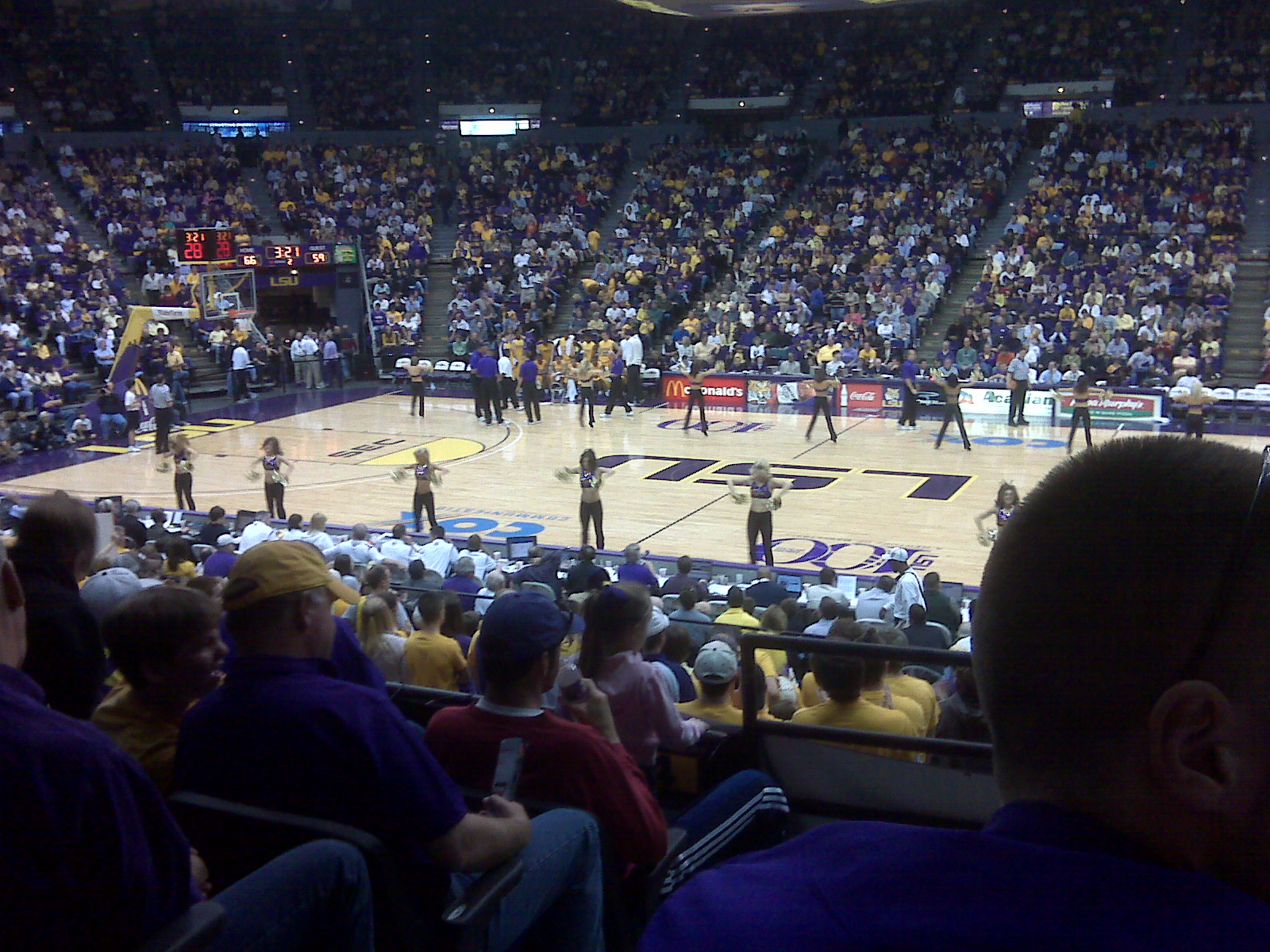
Pete Maravich Assembly Center

The LSU men's basketball team participates in the Southeastern Conference and is currently coached by Will Wade. They play home games at the Pete Maravich Assembly Center.

- National Championships (1): 1935†
- Final Four appearances (4): 1953, 1981, 1986, 2006
- Sweet Sixteen appearances (10): 1953, 1954, 1979, 1980, 1981, 1986, 1987, 2000, 2006, 2019
- SEC Championships (11): 1935, 1953, 1954, 1979, 1981, 1985, 1991, 2000, 2006, 2009, 2019

† LSU is the only school that officially claims a basketball national championship on the basis of a win in the American Legion Bowl, an event that made no claim to determine a national champion. The Helms Athletic Foundation retroactively named the 19–1 NYU Violets its national champion for the 1934–35 season. The retroactive Premo-Porretta Power Poll also ranked the Violets as its 1935 national champion. The Premo-Porretta poll ranked LSU fifth.

=== Women's basketball ===
The LSU women's basketball team participates in the Southeastern Conference and is currently coached by Kim Mulkey. They play home games at the Pete Maravich Assembly Center.

- National Championships (1): 2023
- AIAW/NCAA Final Four appearances (7): 1977, 2004, 2005, 2006, 2007, 2008, 2023
- NCAA Sweet Sixteen appearances (14): 1984, 1986, 1989, 1997, 1999, 2000, 2003, 2004, 2005, 2006, 2007, 2008, 2013, 2023
- SEC Championships (3): 2005, 2006, 2008

=== Women's beach volleyball ===
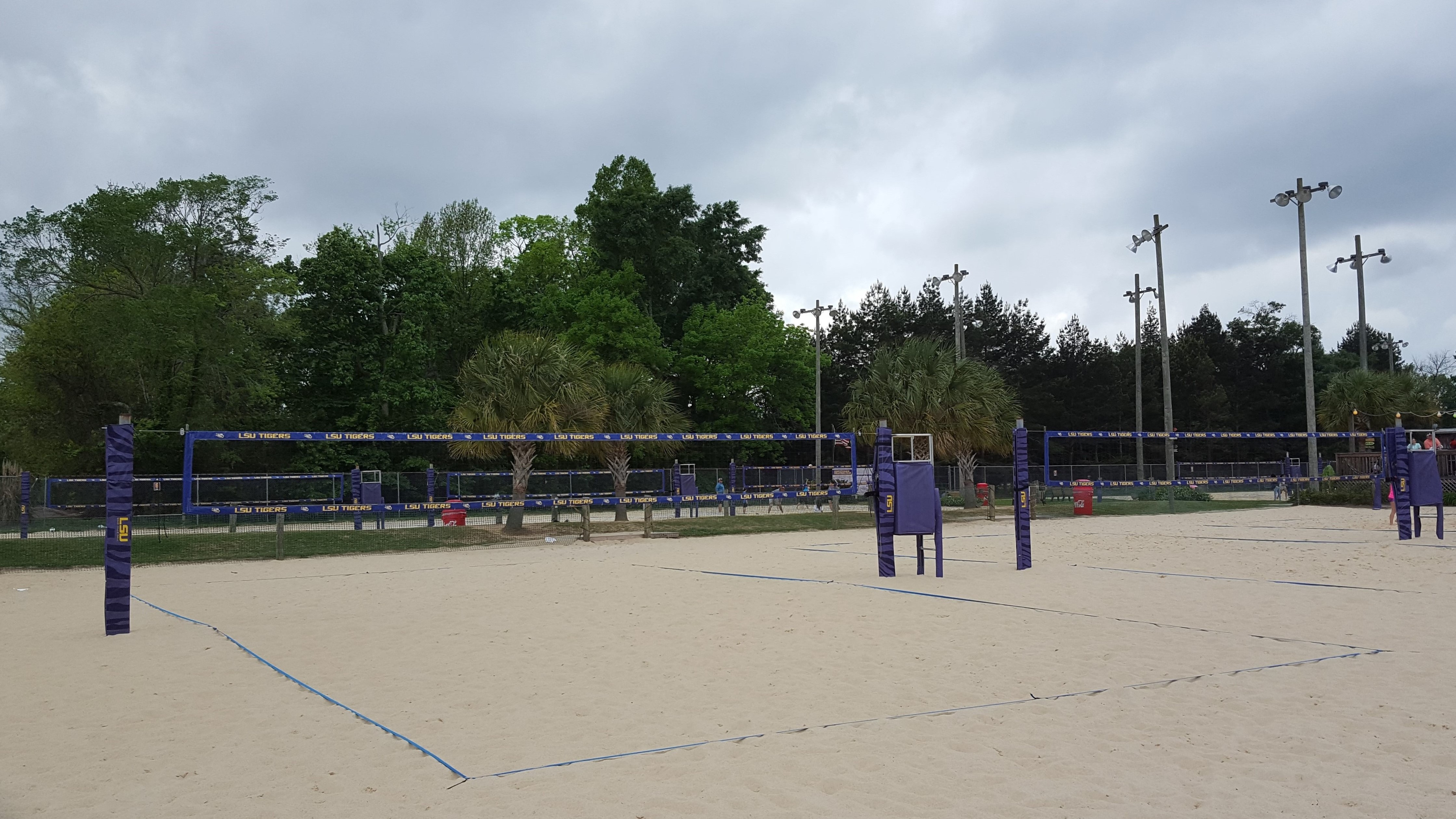
Mango's Beach Volleyball Club

The women's beach volleyball team participates in the Mountain Pacific Sports Federation (MPSF). They were formerly members of the Coastal Collegiate Sports Association (CCSA) until that conference's disbanding in 2025. They are coached by Russell Brock and play home games at the LSU Beach Volleyball Stadium.

- National Championships (0): none
- Conference Championships (0): — none

=== Men's cross country ===
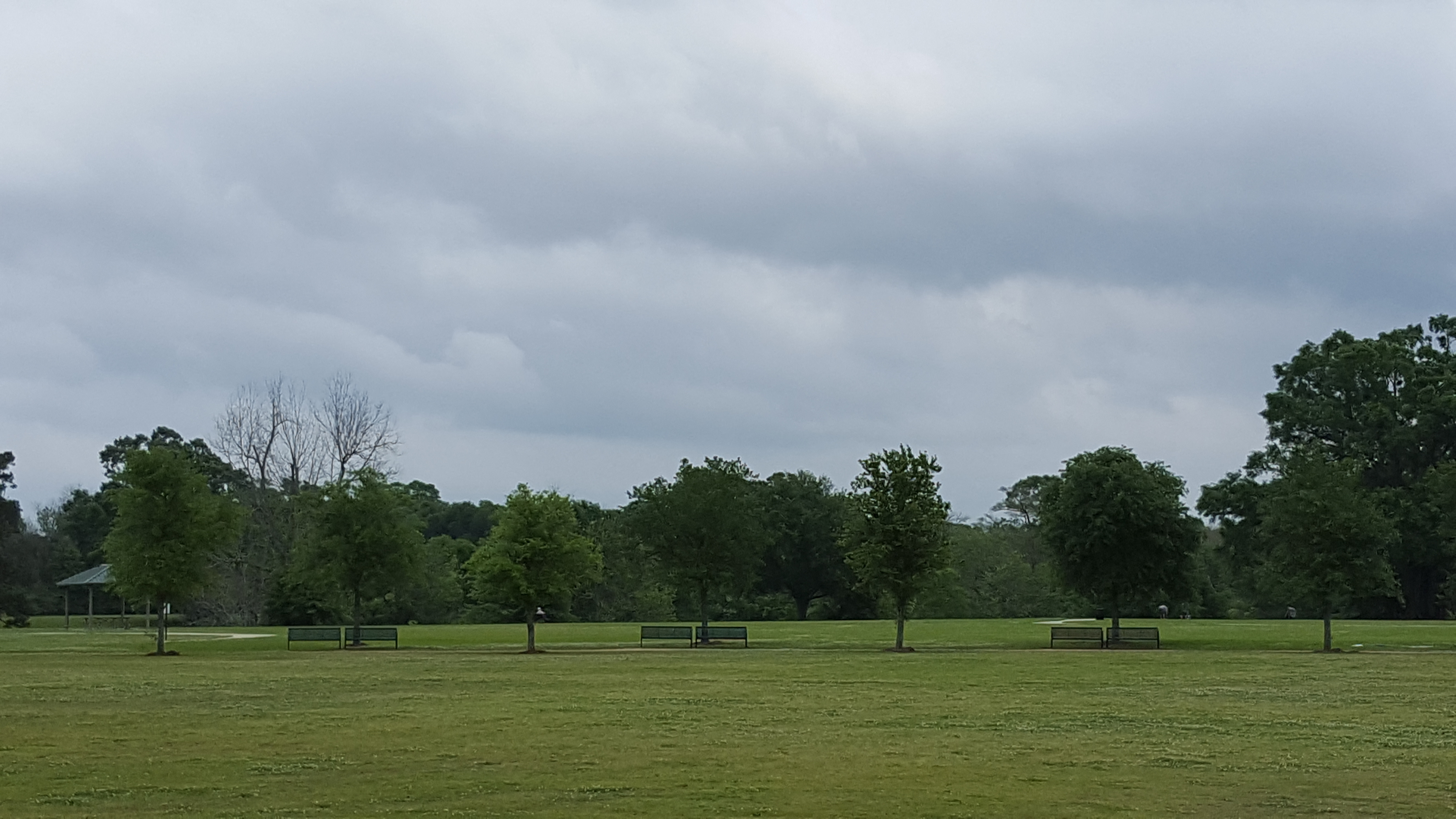
Highland Road Park

The men's cross country team participates in the Southeastern Conference and is currently coached by Dennis Shaver. They host home meets at Highland Road Park.

- National Championships - Men (0): none
- SEC Championships - Men (0): none

=== Women's cross country ===
The women's cross country team participates in the Southeastern Conference and is currently coached by Dennis Shaver. They host home meets at Highland Road Park.

- National Championships - Women (0): none
- SEC Championships - Women (0): none

=== Football ===
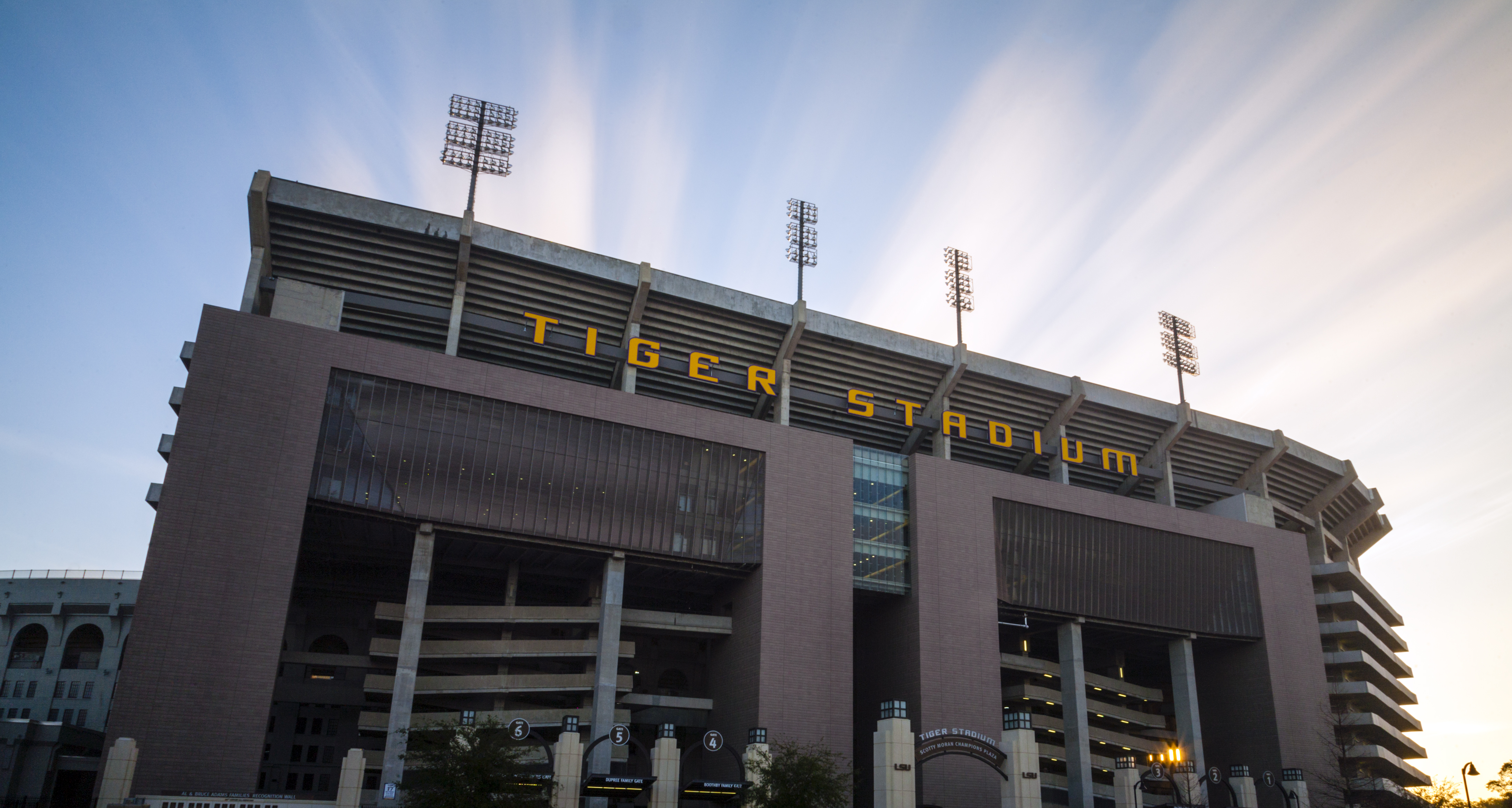
Tiger Stadium

The LSU Tigers football team competes in the Division I - Football Bowl Subdivision (FBS) of the National Collegiate Athletic Association (NCAA) and the Western Division of the Southeastern Conference (SEC). They play in Tiger Stadium, which has a capacity of 102,321. LSU has won four national championships, including two in the last decade. The first national championship was following the regular season in 1958. LSU played Clemson in the 1959 Sugar Bowl on January 1, 1959, following the team being named national champions. LSU won their second national championship during the 2003 season by defeating the Oklahoma Sooners in the 2004 BCS National Championship Game. A controversy arose as the USC Trojans were awarded the Associated Press National Championship even though they did not play in the BCS Championship Game. LSU's win in the 2008 BCS National Championship Game (2007 season) was the Tigers third national championship. They became the first two-loss team to compete for and win the national championship, and the first team to win two Bowl Championship Series titles. During the 2019 season, LSU defeated the Clemson Tigers 42–25 in the 2020 College Football Playoff National Championship game in New Orleans for their fourth national title.

The team is currently coached by Lane Kiffin.

- National championships (4): 1958, 2003, 2007, 2019
- Conference championships (15)
  - SIAA championships (2): 1896, 1908
  - SoCon championships (1):1932
  - SEC championships (11): 1935, 1936, 1958, 1961, 1970, 1986, 2001, 2003, 2007, 2011, 2019
- Divisional championships (6): 2001, 2003, 2005, 2007, 2011, 2019, 2022

=== Men's golf ===
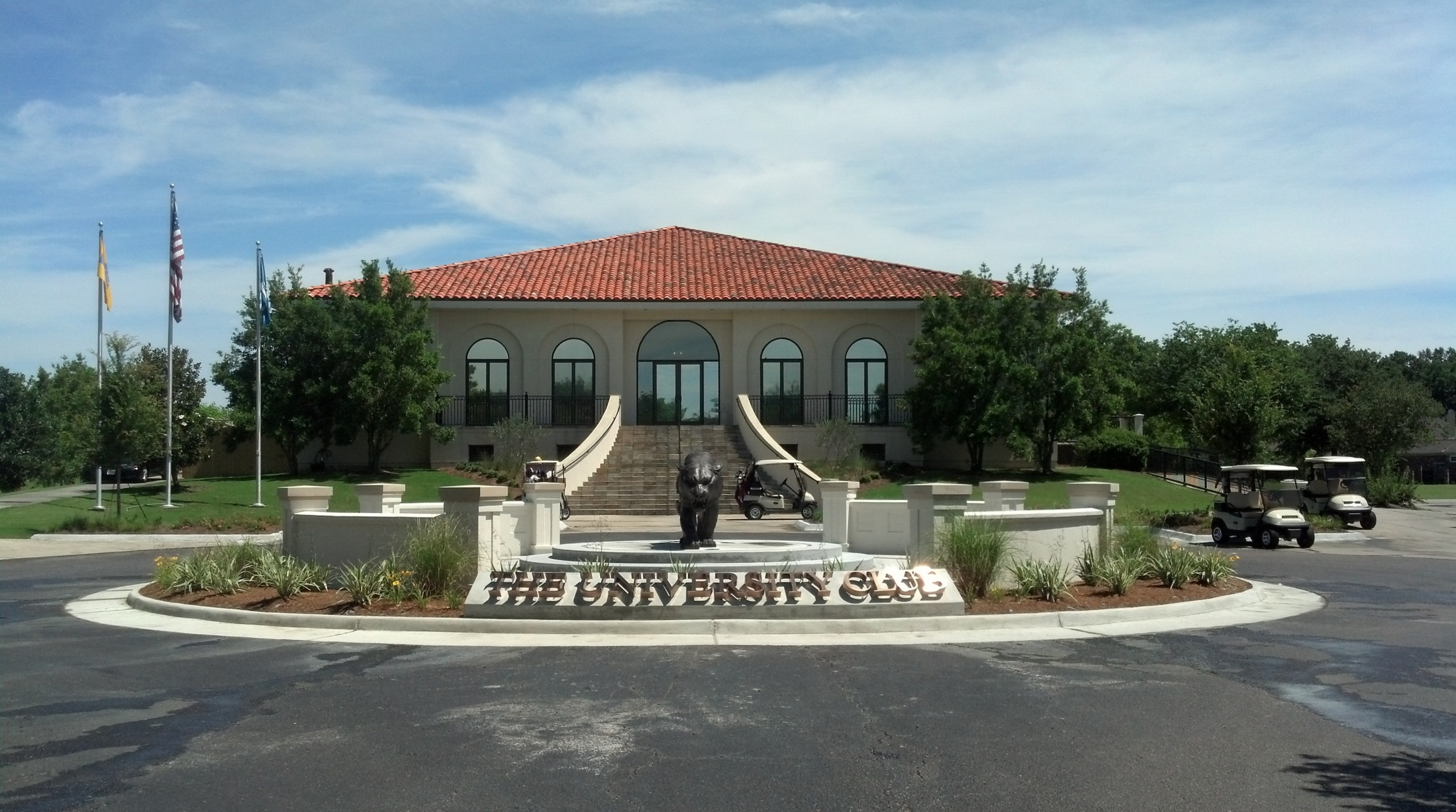
University Club of Baton Rouge

The men's golf team participates in the Southeastern Conference and is currently coached by Chuck Winstead. The University Club of Baton Rouge is the home venue for the team.

- National Championships (5): 1940 (co-champion with Princeton), 1942 (co-champion with Stanford), 1947, 1955, 2015
- SEC Championships (16): 1937, 1938, 1939, 1940, 1942, 1946, 1947, 1948, 1953, 1954, 1960, 1966, 1967, 1986, 1987, 2015
- Individual national champions (3): Fred Haas (1937), Earl Stewart (1941), John Peterson (2011)

=== Women's golf ===
The women's golf team participates in the Southeastern Conference and is currently coached by Garrett Runion. The University Club of Baton Rouge is the home venue for the team.

- National Championships (0): none
- SEC Championships (2): 1992, 2022
- Individual national champions (1): Austin Ernst (2011)

Former coaches

- Karen Bahnsen
- Buddy Alexander
- Mary Holmes

=== Women's gymnastics ===
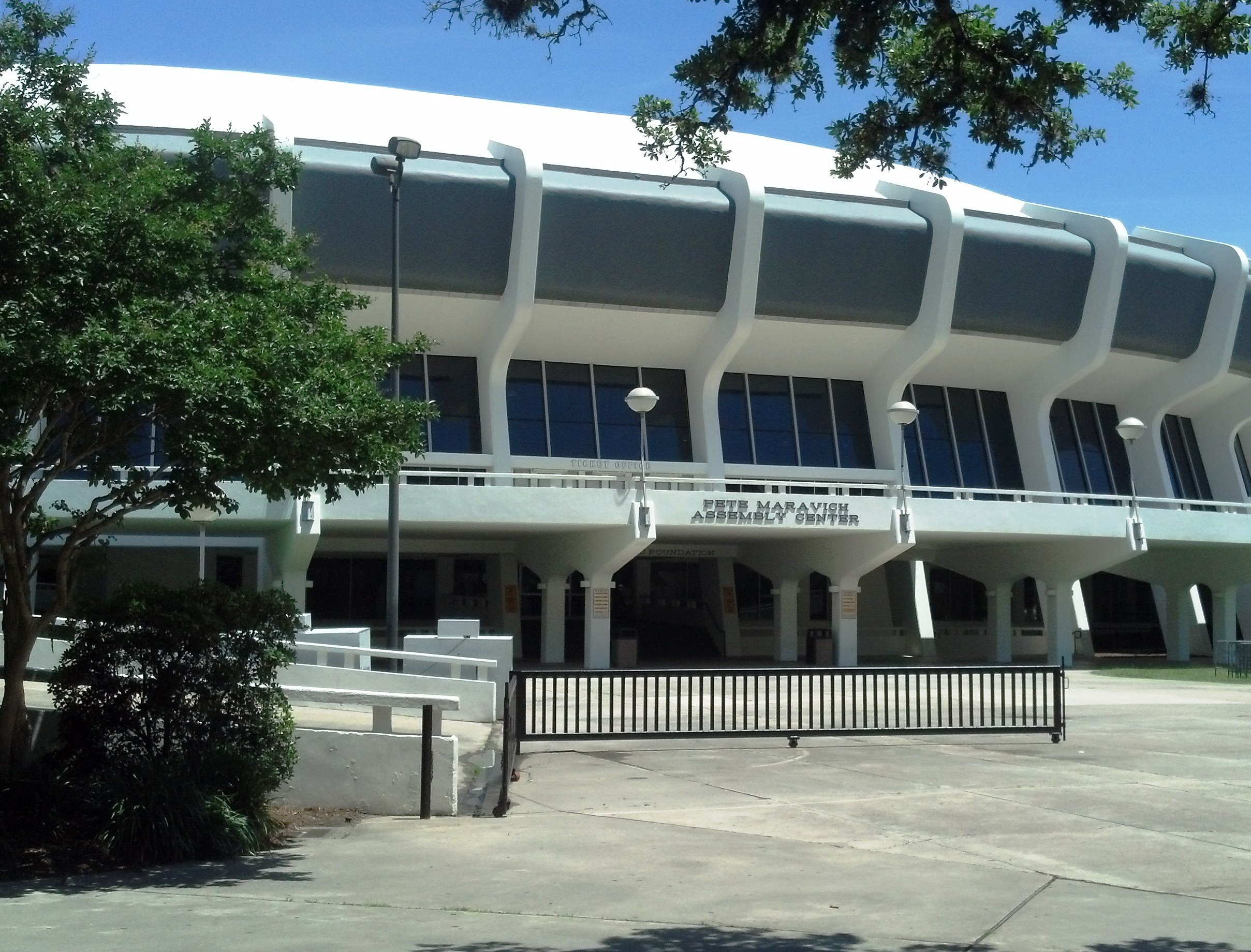
Pete Maravich Assembly Center

The women's gymnastics team participates in the Southeastern Conference and is currently coached by Jay Clark . The Pete Maravich Assembly Center is the home venue for the team.

- National Championships (1): 2024
- SEC Championships (6): 1981, 2017, 2018, 2019, 2024, 2025

=== Women's soccer ===
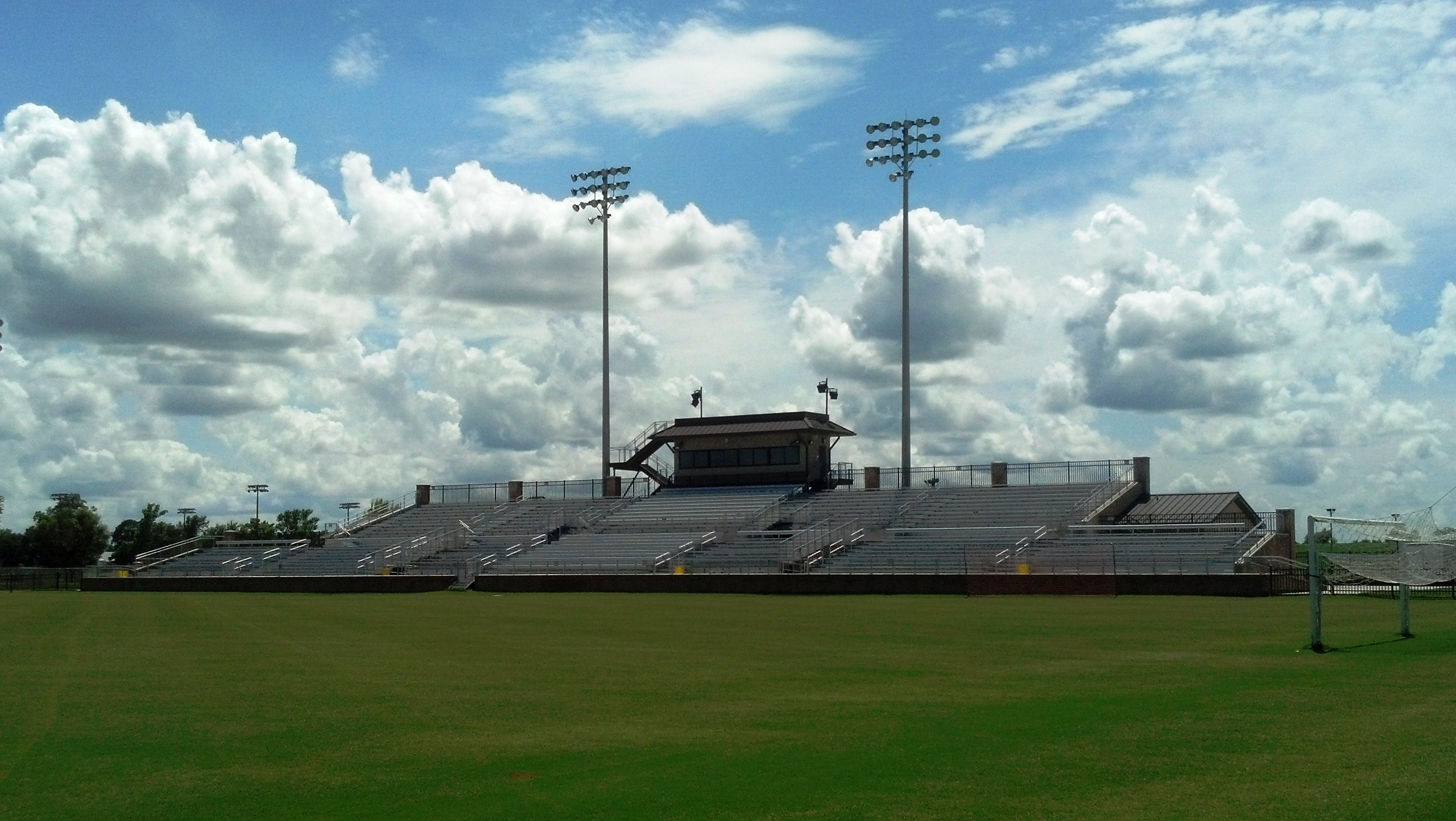
LSU Soccer Stadium

The soccer team participates in the Western division of the Southeastern Conference and is currently coached by Sian Hudson. They play home games at the LSU Soccer Stadium.

- National Championships (0): none
- SEC Championships (1): 2018

=== Softball ===
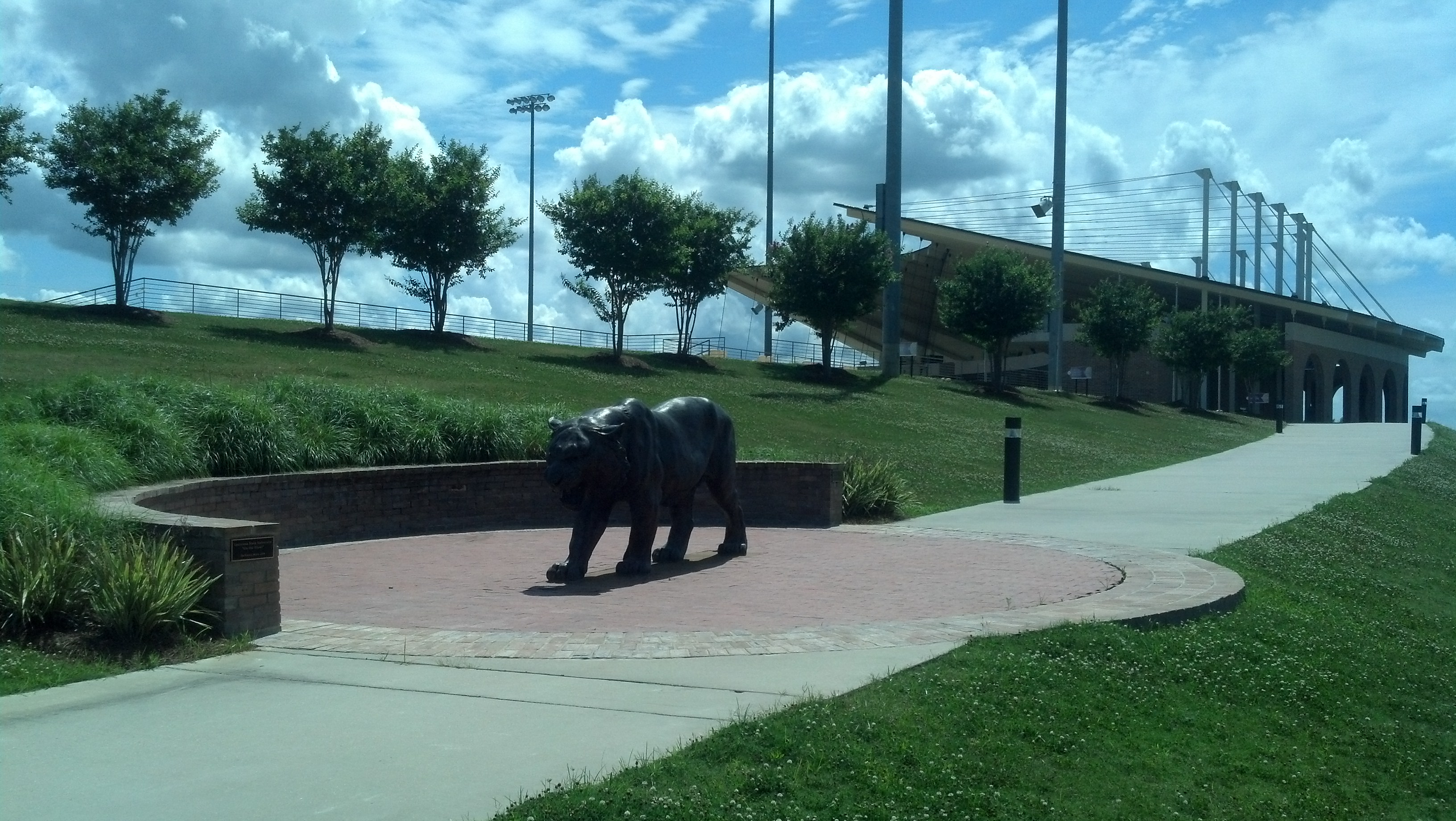
Tiger Park

The softball team participates in the Western division of the Southeastern Conference and is currently coached by Beth Torina. They play home games at Tiger Park.

- National Championships (0): none
- WCWS appearances (5): 2001, 2004, 2012, 2015, 2016, 2017
- SEC Championships (5): 1999, 2000, 2001, 2002, 2004

=== Men's swimming and diving ===
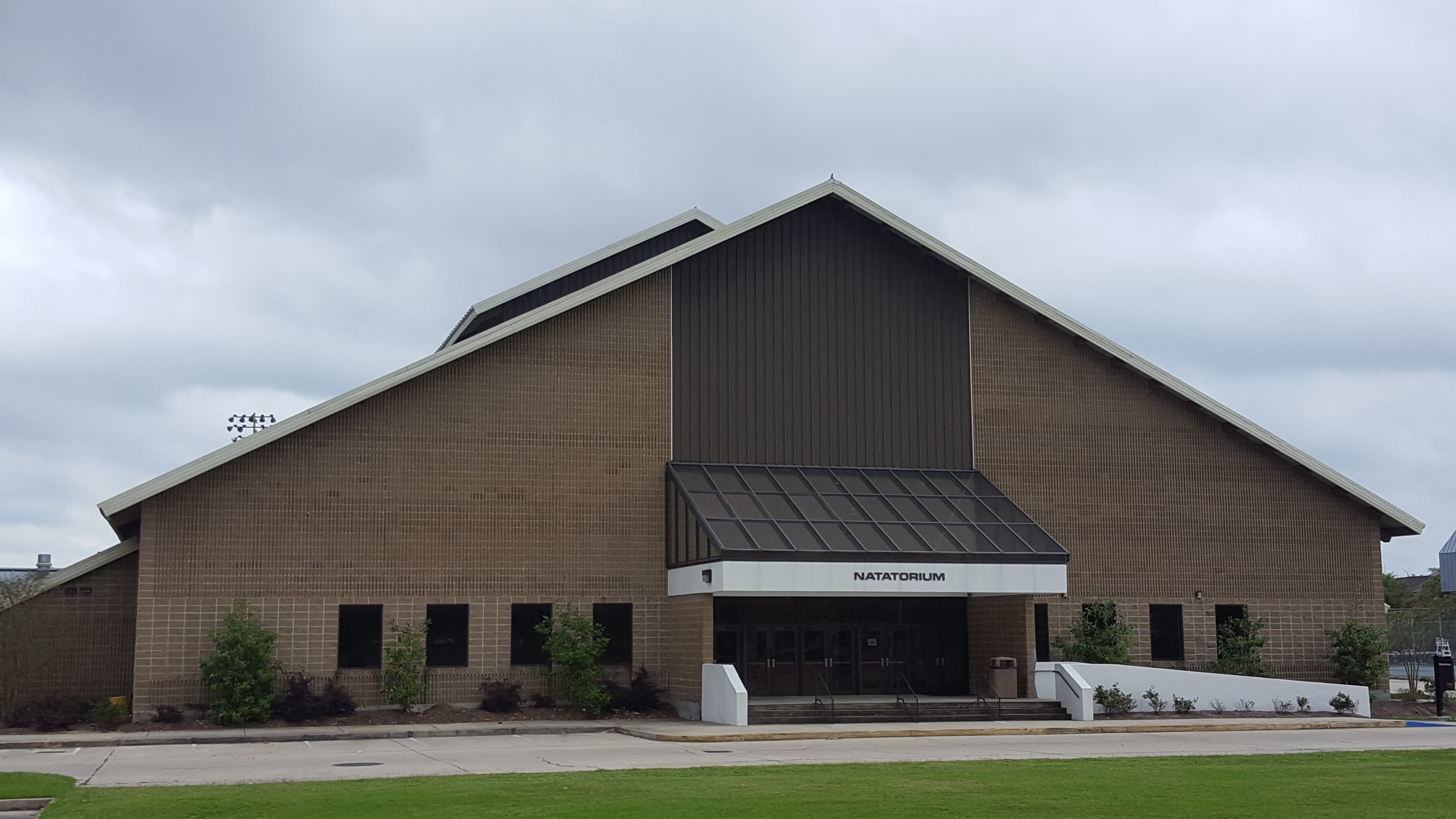
LSU Natatorium

The men's swimming and diving teams participate in the Southeastern Conference. The swim team is currently coached by Rick Bishop and the diving team is currently coached by Drew Livingston. They host home swim meets at the LSU Natatorium.

- National Championships (0): none
- SEC Championships (1): 1988

=== Women's swimming and diving ===
The women's swimming and diving teams participate in the Southeastern Conference. The swim team is currently coached by Rick Bishop and the diving team is currently coached by Drew Livingston. They host home swim meets at the LSU Natatorium.

- National Championships (0): none
- SEC Championships (0): none

=== Men's tennis ===
The men's tennis team participates in the Western division of the Southeastern Conference and is currently coached by head coach Danny Bryan. They play home matches at the LSU Tennis Complex.

- National Championships (0): none
- SEC Championships (4): 1976, 1985, 1998, 1999

Former coaches

- Jeff Brown
- Jerry Simmons
- Steve Strome
- Steve Carter
- Dub Robinson
- Mike Donahue
- Charles Diel
- Paul Young

=== Women's tennis ===
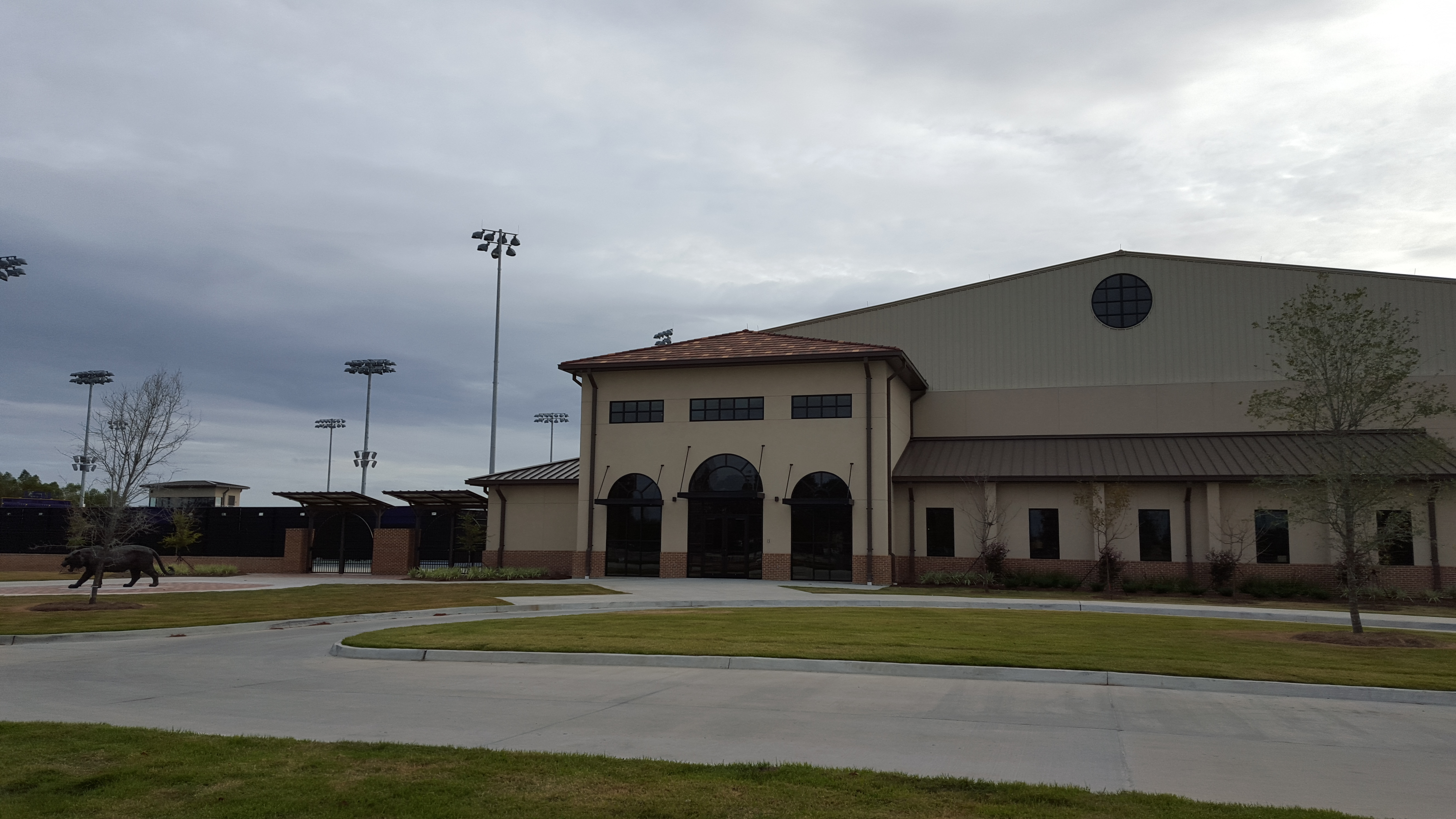
LSU Tennis Complex

The women's tennis team participates in the Western division of the Southeastern Conference and is currently coached by head coach Taylor Fogleman. They play home matches at the LSU Tennis Complex.

- National Championships (0): none
- SEC Championships (0): none

Former coaches

- Tony Minnis
- Geoff Macdonald
- Phillip Campbell
- Betty Sue Hagerman
- Karen McCarter Elliot
- Pat Newman

=== Men's indoor track and field ===
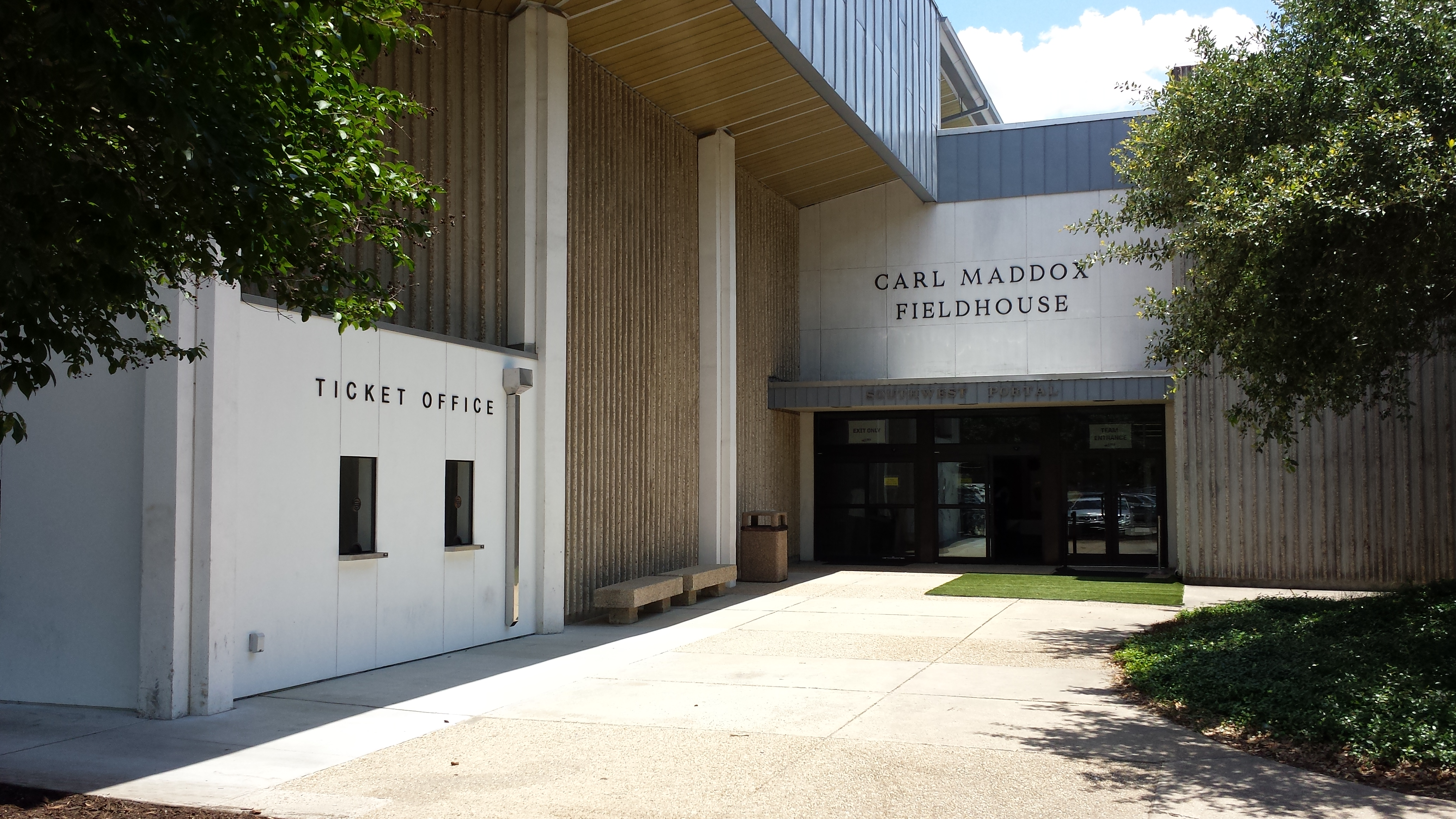
Carl Maddox Field House

The men's indoor track and field team participates in the Southeastern Conference and is currently coached by Dennis Shaver. They host home track meets at the Carl Maddox Field House.

- National Championships (2): 2001, 2004
- SEC Championships (4): 1957, 1963, 1989, 1990

=== Women's indoor track and field ===
The women's indoor track and field team participates in the Southeastern Conference and is currently coached by Dennis Shaver. They host home track meets at the Carl Maddox Field House.

- National Championships (11): 1987, 1989, 1991, 1993, 1994, 1995, 1996, 1997, 2002, 2003, 2004
- SEC Championships (12): 1985, 1987, 1988, 1989, 1991, 1993, 1995, 1996, 1998, 1999, 2008, 2011

=== Men's outdoor track and field ===
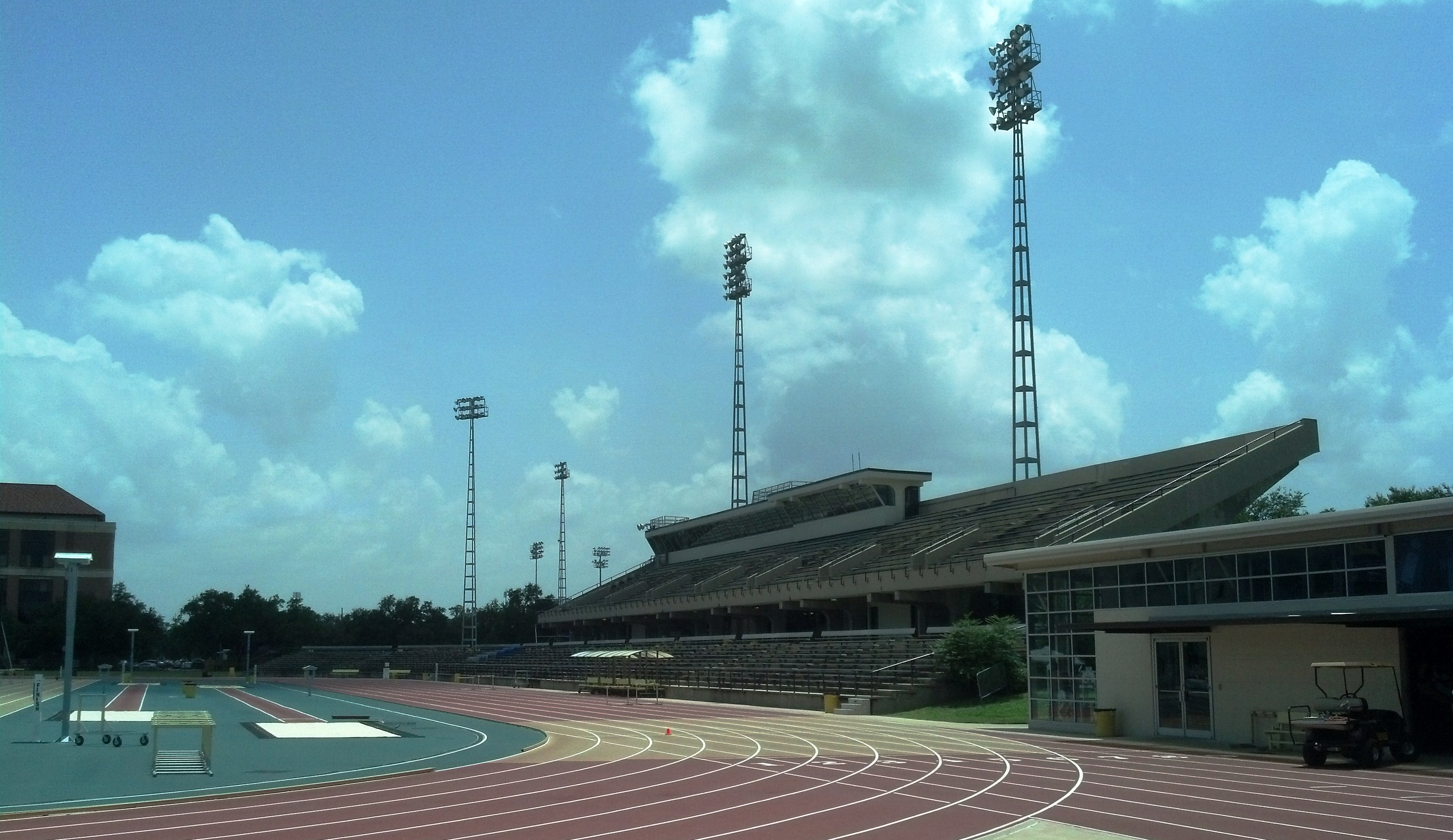
Bernie Moore Track Stadium

The men's outdoor track and field team participates in the Southeastern Conference and is currently coached by Dennis Shaver. They host home track meets at the Bernie Moore Track Stadium.

- National Championships (5): 1933, 1989, 1990, 2002, 2021
- SEC Championships (23): 1933, 1934, 1935, 1936, 1938, 1939, 1940, 1941, 1942, 1943, 1946, 1947, 1948, 1951, 1957, 1958, 1959, 1960, 1963, 1988, 1989, 1990, 2019

=== Women's outdoor track and field ===
The women's outdoor track and field team participates in the Southeastern Conference and is currently coached by Dennis Shaver. They host home track meets at the Bernie Moore Track Stadium.

- National Championships (14): 1987, 1988, 1989, 1990, 1991, 1992, 1993, 1994, 1995, 1996, 1997, 2000, 2003, 2008, 2012 (vacated)
- SEC Championships (14): 1985, 1987, 1988, 1989, 1990, 1991, 1993, 1996, 2007, 2008, 2010, 2011, 2012, 2024

=== Women's volleyball ===
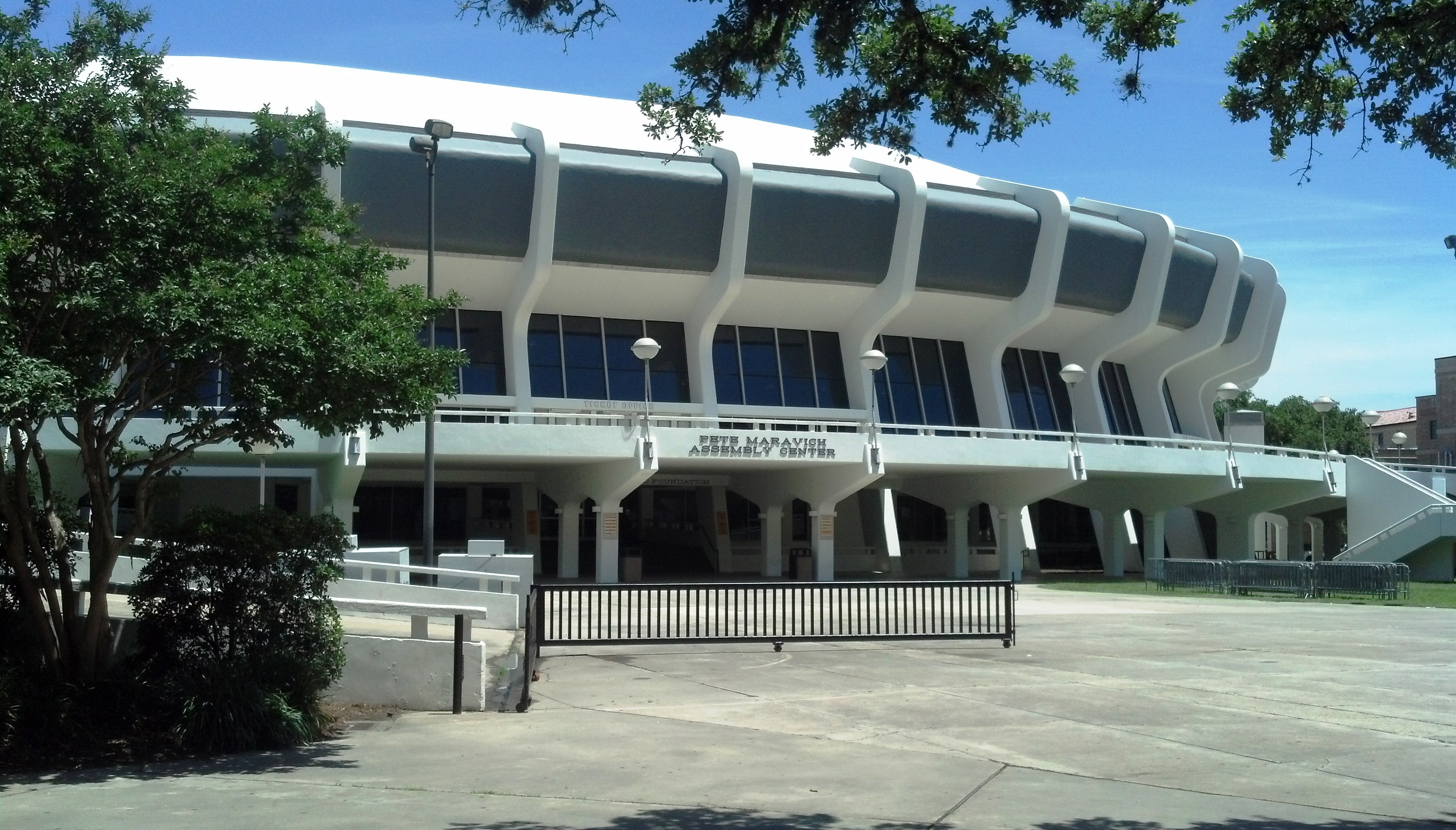
Pete Maravich Assembly Center

The volleyball team participates in the Western division of the Southeastern Conference and is currently coached by Fran Flory. They play home games at the Pete Maravich Assembly Center.

- National Championships (0): none
- Final Four appearances (2): 1990, 1991
- SEC Championships (4): 1986, 1989, 1990, 1991

== Former varsity sports ==
=== Boxing ===
LSU boxing started as a club sport in 1929 and enjoyed its first varsity season in 1930. The Tigers held matches at the Huey P. Long Field House and starting in 1937 at the John M. Parker Agricultural Coliseum.

In LSU's first season, the team had a record of 5–2; they went 6–1 in the ensuing 1931 campaign. In 1934, LSU won its first Southeastern Conference title by beating rival Tulane. Late in the 1930s, LSU won additional SEC titles and finished with a second-place finish in the 1939 NCAA Tournament and a third-place finish in 1940 NCAA Tournament. Some Tiger stalwarts during this period were Heston Daniel, Al Michael, Snyder Parham and Dub Robinson. World War II interrupted the sport, but LSU returned to varsity boxing in 1948.

The 1949 campaign, LSU's second season after the war, proved to be its best. Paced by individual national champions Wilbert "Pee Wee" Moss and Edsel "Tad" Thrash and coached by Jim Owen, the Tigers went undefeated in regular season play. They finished the year by beating South Carolina in front of 11,000 fans in Parker Coliseum, en route to its first and only national title. Boxing at LSU continued as a varsity sport during the early 1950s as LSU fans watched LSU greats Calvin Clary, Crowe Peele and Bobby Freeman. Late in the decade, a dwindling number of schools in the region that sponsored boxing as a varsity sport led to higher travel costs for the LSU team. Ultimately, LSU announced in 1956 it would no longer support boxing on the varsity level.

LSU recorded an all-time dual meet record of 101–22–6, one national championship, 31 individual conference champions, 11 individual NCAA champions and 12 NCAA runners-up.

=== Men's wrestling ===
LSU fielded a varsity men's wrestling team from 1968 to 1985. It won seven Southeastern Conference titles. The team also had two eighth-place finishes in the NCAA Tournament in 1983 and 1984. The wrestling program was dropped as a result of Title IX compliance in 1985.

From 1968 to 1978, LSU was coached by Dale Ketelsen. His teams won two Southeastern Conference wrestling tournament titles. He produced 15 individual conference champions and was also a member of the NCAA wrestling rules committee while at LSU. From 1979 to 1985, the team was coached by Larry Sciacchetano. His teams won five Southeastern Conference titles.

Men's wrestlers

- Phil Bode was the 1971 and 1972 SEC champion.
- Jules Plaisance enrolled at LSU in 1969 and won three Southeastern Conference championships at 142, 150, & 158 lb. weight classes. He finished second once.
- John Tenta, who went on to fame in the World Wrestling Federation, was a heavyweight wrestler at LSU.

== Non-varsity sports ==
=== Men's rugby ===
Founded in 1970, LSU rugby has played its matches at the UREC Field Complex since 2006. LSU has a tradition of success since its founding, highlighted by its 22-game winning streak during the 1996–97 season. LSU won the national collegiate championship tournament in 1976.

More recently, LSU rugby has been successful in conference play and in national competition. LSU plays in the Southeastern Conference against its traditional SEC rivals. In 2009, LSU defeated Colorado and Air Force to advance to the national quarterfinals before losing to San Diego State, and in 2010, LSU again defeated Colorado to qualify for the sweet 16 round of the national playoffs. LSU competed at the 2011 Collegiate Rugby Championship, finishing 9th in a tournament broadcast live on NBC. LSU finished first in the SEC West Division in 2012, with a 5–2 record.

=== Men's soccer ===
Founded in 1964, the LSU men's soccer team has competed in the Collegiate Soccer League of Louisiana (CSLL) since 2016. The team plays its home games at the UREC Field Complex.

In 1998, the team won its only national title, winning the NIRSA National Open Division. In 2012, the team earned its first-ever bid to the NIRSA National "Closed" Championship Division.

=== Men's volleyball ===
The LSU men's volleyball team competes in the Southern Intercollegiate Volleyball Association. The competes with other teams throughout the region. The team competes for championship honors in the SIVA tournament.

=== Other sports ===
Sport	Association
Bowling team	United States Bowling Congress Collegiate Division, Southwest Intercollegiate Bowling Conference
Men's Disc Golf team	2023 Div II Qualifier Nationals
Women's Disc Golf team	2023 Div II Qualifier Nationals
Women's equestrian team	
Men's ice hockey team	American Collegiate Hockey Association, South Eastern Collegiate Hockey Conference
Men's lacrosse team	United States Intercollegiate Lacrosse Association, Lone Star Alliance
Women's lacrosse team	Women's Collegiate Lacrosse Associates, Texas Women's Lacrosse League
Powerlifting team	
Rowing team	American Collegiate Rowing Association, Southern Intercollegiate Rowing Association
Women's rugby team	
Triathlon team	
Water polo team	

== Championships ==
LSU varsity teams have won 53 team national championships. 48 of these were recognized by the NCAA, ranking them 9th overall.

- Men's (21)
  - Baseball (8): 1991, 1993, 1996, 1997, 2000, 2009, 2023, 2025
  - Boxing (1): 1949
  - Golf (5): 1940, 1942, 1947, 1955, 2015
  - Indoor Track & Field (2): 2001, 2004
  - Outdoor Track & Field (5): 1933, 1989, 1990, 2002, 2021
- Women's (27)
  - Basketball (1): 2023
  - Indoor Track & Field (11): 1987, 1989, 1991, 1993, 1994, 1995, 1996, 1997, 2002, 2003, 2004
  - Outdoor Track & Field (14): 1987, 1988, 1989, 1990, 1991, 1992, 1993, 1994, 1995, 1996, 1997, 2000, 2003, 2008, 2012 (vacated)
  - Gymnastics (1): 2024

=== Other national team championships ===
- Men's
  - Football (4): 1958, 2003, 2007, 2019
  - Basketball (1): 1935
  - Rugby (1): 1976

== NACDA Directors' Cup ==
The National Association of Collegiate Directors of Athletics (NACDA) ranks athletic departments on an annual basis. Each institution is awarded points in a pre-determined number of sports for men and women. The overall champion is the institution which has a broad-based program, achieving success in many sports, both men's and women's. The winner in each division receives a crystal trophy.

NACDA All-Sports Rankings

Year	Rank
1993–94	36th
1994–95	19th
1995–96	16th
1996–97	10th
1997–98	10th
1998–99	16th
1999–00	10th

Year	Rank
2000–01	22nd
2001–02	10th
2002–03	23rd
2003–04	11th
2004–05	23rd
2005–06	20th
2006–07	17th

Year	Rank
2010–11	19th
2007–08	8th
2008–09	9th
2009–10	19th
2011–12	13th
2012–13	19th
2013–14	24th

Year	Rank
2014–15	15th
2015–16	19th
2016–17	18th
2017–18	27th
2018–19	11th

== Athletic facilities ==
The following is a list of the athletic facilities for the LSU Tigers and Lady Tigers. It includes LSU's outdoor stadiums, indoor arenas, and training and practice facilities.

- Tiger Stadium

Tiger Stadium is the home stadium of the LSU football team. The stadium is also known by its nickname, "Death Valley". It opened in 1924 with an original seating capacity of 12,000. Tiger Stadium currently has a seating capacity of 102,321, making it the sixth largest stadium in the NCAA and the ninth largest stadium in the world.

Tiger Stadium also has some unique features. Unlike most football fields, where only the yard lines ending in "0" are marked, Tiger Stadium also marks the yard lines ending in "5". It also has "H" style (or "offset") goal posts, as opposed to the more modern "Y" ("slingshot" or "tuning fork") style used by other schools today, although they are not the true "H" goal posts which were once ubiquitous on American football fields, since the posts are behind the uprights and connected to the uprights by curved bars. This "H" style allows the team to run through the goal post in the north end zone. The crossbar from the goalposts which stood in the north end zone of Tiger Stadium from 1955 through 1984 is now mounted above the door which leads from LSU's locker room onto the playing field. The crossbar is painted with the word "WIN!", and superstition dictates every player entering the field touch the bar on his way out the door.

- Charles McClendon Practice Facility

The Charles McClendon Practice Facility is the name of the LSU Tigers football practice facility. The facility features the LSU Football Operations Center, the Tigers Indoor Practice Facility and four outdoor 100-yard football practice fields. In 2002, it was named after former LSU head coach and College Football Hall of Fame member, Charles McClendon.

- LSU Football Operations Center

The LSU Football Operations Center, built in 2006 and renovated in 2019, is an all-in-one facility that includes the Tigers locker room, players' lounge, weight room, training room, equipment room, video operations center and coaches offices. The operations center atrium holds team displays and graphics, trophy cases and memorabilia of LSU football. A nutrition center for student athletes is being added to the facility.

- LSU Indoor Practice Facility

The LSU Indoor Practice Facility, built in 1991, is a climate-controlled 82,500 square feet facility connected to the Football Operations Center and adjacent to LSU's four outdoor 100-yard football practice fields. The facility holds the 100-yd Anderson-Feazel LSU Indoor field.

- LSU Outdoor Practice Fields

The LSU Outdoor Practice Fields consist of four outdoor practice fields that are directly adjacent to the football operations center and indoor practice facility. Three of the fields are natural grass, while the fourth has a Momentum Field Turf by SportExe playing surface.

- Pete Maravich Assembly Center

The Pete Maravich Assembly Center, opened in 1972, is the home arena to the Louisiana State University Tigers and Lady Tigers basketball teams, Tigers gymnastics team and Tigers indoor volleyball team. The stadium is also known by its nicknames, "Deaf Dome" and "PMAC". It has a current seating capacity of 13,215. It was originally known as the LSU Assembly Center, but was renamed in honor of LSU basketball legend Pete Maravich, shortly after his death in 1988. The auxiliary gym located underneath the north section of the arena is the practice facility for the volleyball team.

The offices for the Tiger Athletic Foundation (TAF) are also located in the arena. TAF is a private, non-profit corporation dedicated to supporting Louisiana State University (LSU) and its athletics program. It is the primary source of private funding for LSU athletics.

- LSU Basketball Practice Facility

The LSU basketball practice facility which is connected to the Maravich Center was completed in 2010. The facility features separate, full-size duplicate gymnasiums for the men's and women's basketball teams. They include a regulation NCAA court in length with two regulation high school courts in the opposition direction. The courts are exact replicas of the Maravich Center game court and have two portable goals and four retractable goals. The facility also houses team locker rooms, a team lounge, training rooms, a coach's locker room and coach's offices.

The building also includes a two-story lobby and staircase that ascends to the second level where a club room is used for pre-game and post-game events and is connected to the Maravich Center concourse. The lobby includes team displays and graphics, trophy cases and memorabilia of LSU Basketball.

- Alex Box Stadium, Skip Bertman Field

Alex Box Stadium, Skip Bertman Field is the home stadium of the LSU Tigers college baseball team and has a seating capacity of 10,326. The stadium section (and LSU's previous baseball stadium 200 yards to the north) were named for Simeon Alex Box, an LSU letterman (1942), Purple Heart and Distinguished Service Cross recipient, who was killed in North Africa during World War II. In 2013, the field was named in honor of former LSU head baseball coach and athletic director Skip Bertman. The first game in the new stadium was played February 20, 2009 versus Villanova.

- Bernie Moore Track Stadium

Bernie Moore Track Stadium is the outdoor stadium for the LSU Tigers and LSU Lady Tigers track & field teams. The facility, built in 1969, has a seating capacity of 5,680. In 1971, the facility was renamed after former LSU football coach, track & field coach and SEC Commissioner Bernie Moore. Moore coached the LSU Track and Field teams for 18 years (1930–47) and led the Tigers to their first NCAA National Championship in 1933. He was SEC Commissioner from 1948–1966.

Located in Bernie Moore Track Stadium is the LSU Tigers and LSU Lady Tigers track and field teams' weight room. The weight room is a 2,000 square foot facility and features 10 multi-purpose power stations, 5 dumbbell stations, 4 power racks, 5 sets of competition plates, 10 competition Olympic bars, 2 multi-purpose racks and an assortment of selectorized machines.

- Carl Maddox Field House

Carl Maddox Field House is the indoor stadium for the LSU Tigers and Lady Tigers track & field teams. It was built in 1975, renovated in 2014 and has a seating capacity of 2,000. In 1998, the facility was renamed in honor of former LSU Athletic Director Carl Maddox.

- Highland Road Park

Highland Road Park is the home course for the LSU Tigers and LSU Lady Tigers cross country teams.

- LSU Beach Volleyball Stadium

Occupying the renovated former W.T. "Dub" Robinson Stadium starting in 2019; LSU Beach Volleyball now plays in the repurposed former home of LSU tennis originally built in 1970. The new stadium features six competition courts with 24-inch deep sand. The courts are state-of-the-art in sand permeability subsurface drainage and sand quality with a smooth sand to concrete transition. They feature an underground irrigation and wetting system that will facilitate competition play during hot days, cooling the sand for comfortable play. Dating back to the program's first season in 2014, the Tigers played their home matches at Mango's Beach Club in Baton Rouge.

- LSU Gymnastics Training Facility

The LSU Gymnastics Training Facility is the practice venue for the LSU Tigers women's gymnastics team. The new facility opened in 2016 and provides 38,000 square feet of training and team space.

- LSU Natatorium

The LSU Natatorium, opened in 1985, is the home arena for the LSU Tigers and LSU Lady Tigers swimming and diving teams. The stadium has a seating capacity of 2,200. The Natatorium features a 50-meter pool, which can be converted into two 25-meter or 25-yard pools with the use of bulkheads and includes a championship diving well with one- and three-meter springboards and five-, seven- and 10-meter platforms.

- LSU Soccer Stadium

The LSU Soccer Stadium is the home stadium for the LSU Tigers women's soccer team. The two-level stadium has a seating capacity of 2,197.

- LSU Tennis Complex

The LSU Tennis Complex, completed in 2016, serves as the home of the LSU Tigers and LSU Lady Tigers tennis teams. The facility provides six indoor tennis courts with a second floor grandstand covering 75,000 square feet and seating for 300. The complex includes 12 lighted outdoor courts with a grandstand that seats 1,400.

- Raising Cane's River Center Arena

The Raising Cane's River Center Arena (originally the Riverside Centroplex Arena and commonly known as the River Center Arena) hosts select LSU Women's Gymnastics home meets. The arena located in Downtown Baton Rouge opened in 1977 and has an 8,900-seating capacity for sporting events.

- Tiger Park

Tiger Park is the home stadium of the LSU Tigers softball team. The park, built in 2009, has an official seating capacity of 1,289. The stadium also features an outfield berm that can accommodate an additional 1,200 fans.

- University Club of Baton Rouge

The University Club of Baton Rouge is the home of the LSU Tigers and Lady Tigers golf teams. The course is a 7,700 yard, Par 72 Championship-Caliber, 300-acre course originally designed in 1998 and later redesigned by former LSU All-American and PGA golfer David Toms and original designer Jim Lipe.

- Mary and Woody Bilyeu Golf Practice Facility

The Mary and Woody Bilyeu Golf Practice Facility functions as the golf-learning center for the LSU Tigers and Lady Tigers golf teams. The clubhouse features a team meeting room, locker rooms and coaches offices.

- Martin J. Broussard Center for Athletic Training

The Martin J. Broussard Center for Athletic Training is the athletic training and rehabilitation center for LSU athletics. The two-story, 22,000 square foot facility, built in 1998, serves as the main athletic training facility for treatments and rehabilitations. The facility is located adjacent to Tiger Stadium and is staffed by full-time certified staff athletic trainers, certified graduate assistants and athletic training students.

- LSU Strength and Conditioning facility

The LSU Strength and Conditioning facility or LSU North Stadium weight room, is a strength training and conditioning facility at Louisiana State University. Built in 1997, it is located adjacent to Tiger Stadium. Measuring 10,000-square feet with a flat surface, it has 28 multi-purpose power stations, 36 assorted selectorized machines and 10 dumbbell stations along with a plyometric specific area, medicine balls, hurdles, plyometric boxes and assorted speed and agility equipment. It also features 2 treadmills, 4 stationary bikes, 2 elliptical cross trainers, a stepper and stepmill.

== LSU Cox Communications Academic Center for Student-Athletes ==
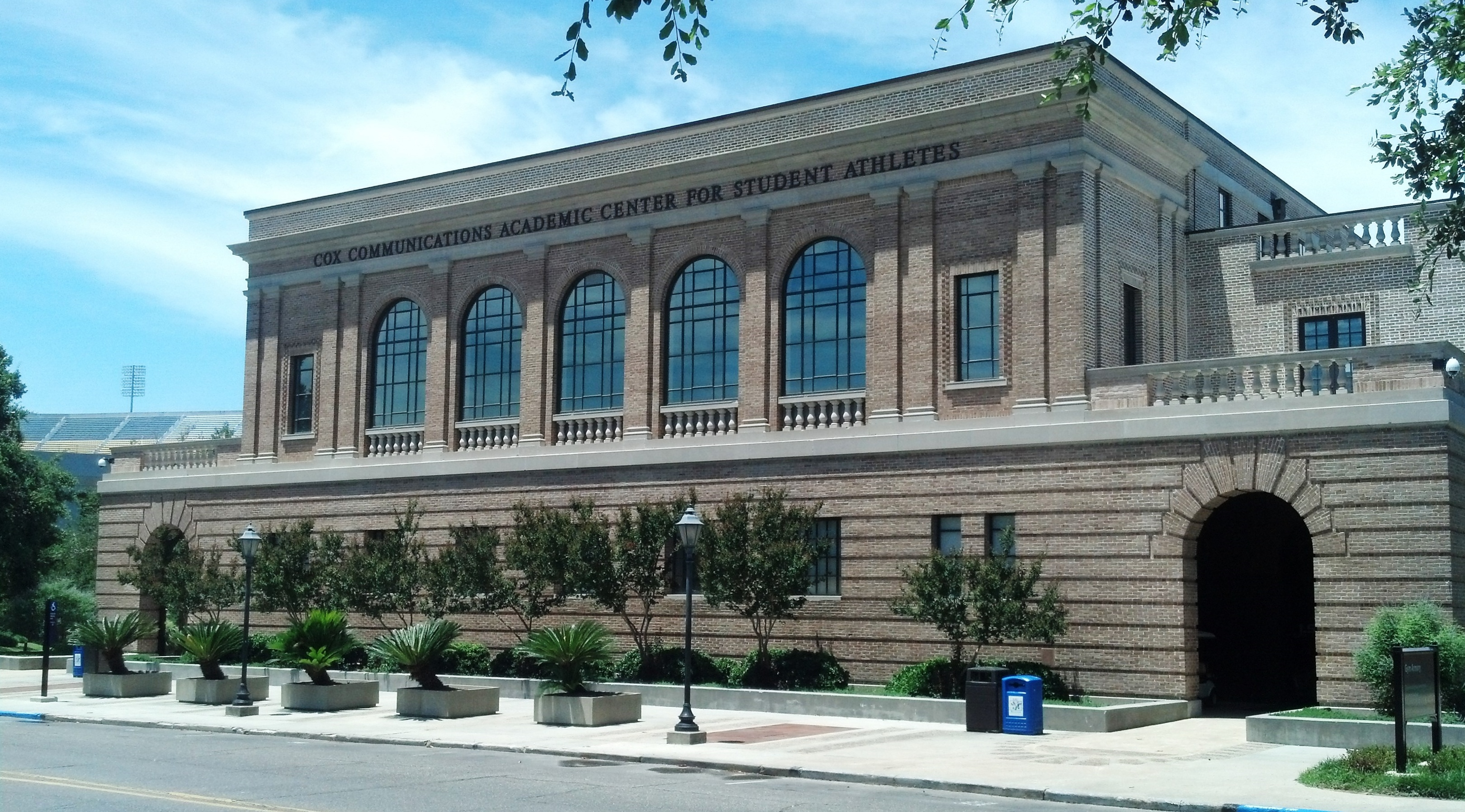
LSU Cox Communications Academic Center for Student-Athletes

The LSU Cox Communications Academic Center for Student-Athletes is located in the Gym/Armory building. The building opened in 1930 and was completely renovated and reopened in 2002 to house the Academic Center for Student-Athletes.

The goal of the academic center is to offer a comprehensive framework tailored to improve the academic skill set of each student-athlete. The 54,000 square foot Academic Center for Student-Athletes is complete with an entry/atrium, 1,000-seat Bo Campbell auditorium, computer labs, instructional technology lab, resource library with tech center, study area, tutorial center, meeting rooms, classrooms, student learning center, Shaquille O'Neal life skills labs and offices, Eric Hill communications studio, career center and Academic Hall of Fame.

== Former athletic facilities ==
- Alex Box Stadium — Baseball (1938–2008)
- First LSU Diamond — Baseball (1929–1935)
- Huey P. Long Field House — Boxing (1932–1936) and Men's and women's swimming and diving (1932–1984)
- John M. Parker Agricultural Coliseum — Men's basketball (1937–1971) and Boxing (1937–1956)
- LSU Gym/Armory — Men's basketball (1930–1937) and Wrestling (1968–1971)
- Mango's Beach Volleyball Club — Women's beach volleyball (2014–2018)
- Second LSU Diamond — Baseball (1936–1937)
- State Field — Baseball (1908–1924), Men's basketball (1893–1924) and Football (1893–1924)
- Original Tiger Park — Softball (1997–2008)
- W.T. "Dub" Robinson Stadium — Men's and women's tennis (1976–2014)

== Non-varsity athletic facilities ==
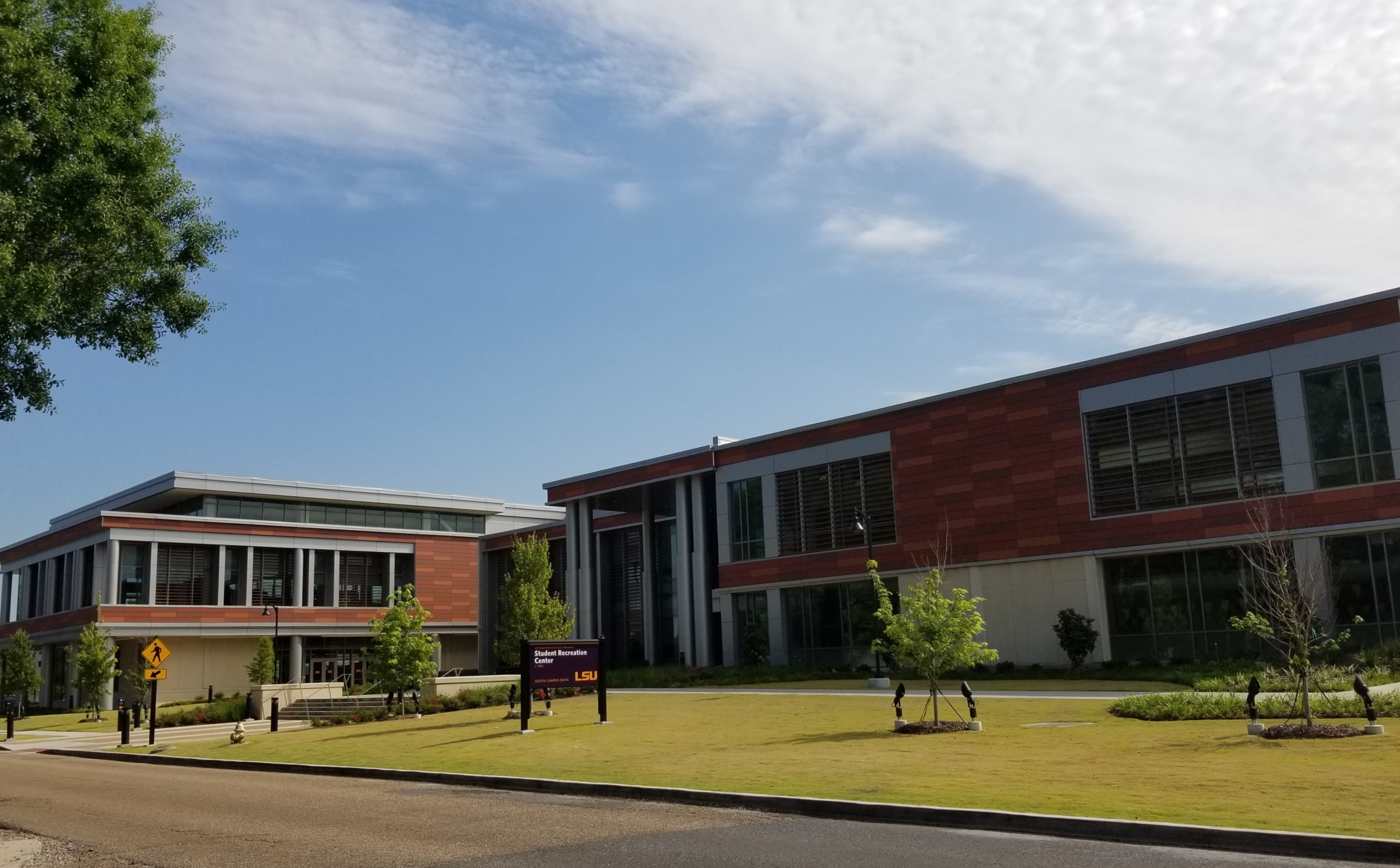
Student Recreation Center (UREC)

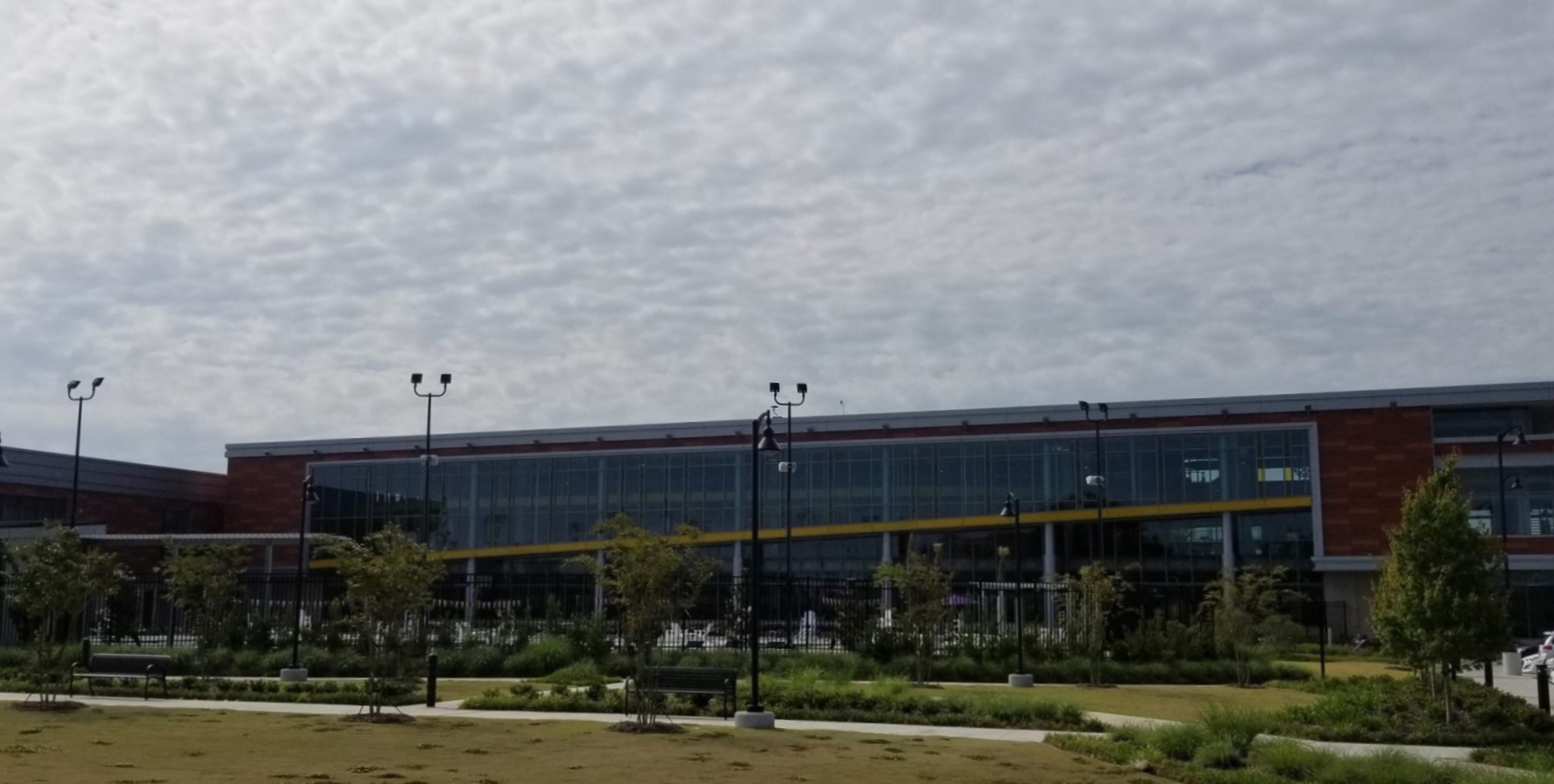
Student Recreation Center (UREC) sports facilities

Student Recreation Center
The Student Recreation Center is an athletic facility on the campus of Louisiana State University that is used for badminton, basketball, beach volleyball, indoor soccer, powerlifting, racquetball, squash, swimming, table tennis, tennis and volleyball.

It is home to the LSU men's basketball club team, powerlifting team, tennis club team, men's volleyball and women's volleyball club teams.

The facility includes two gyms (West Gym: six multi-purpose wood courts, East Gym: one multi-purpose wood court and one synthetic court), indoor climbing area, eight lane 25-yard indoor lap pool, eight lane 25-yard lighted outdoor lap pool, powerlifting room, nine racquetball courts, one squash court, an indoor track, nine lighted outdoor tennis courts, two beach volleyball areas and locker rooms.

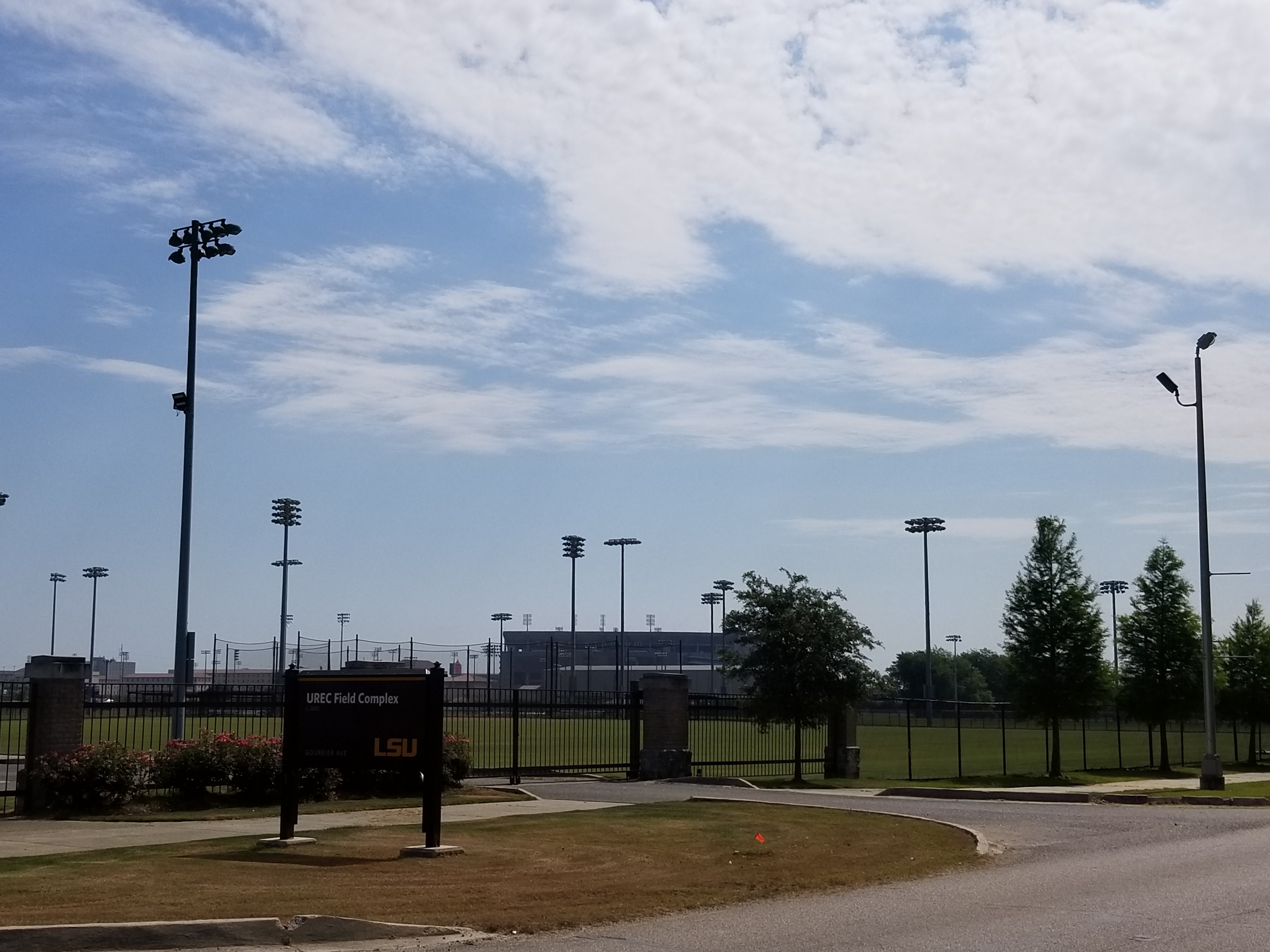
UREC Field Complex

UREC Field Complex
The UREC Field Complex (formerly LSU Sport & Adventure Complex) is an athletic facility on the campus of Louisiana State University that is used for flag football, lacrosse, rugby, soccer, softball and ultimate frisbee.

It is the home of the LSU men's and women's lacrosse teams, men's and women's rugby teams, men's soccer and women's soccer club teams and men's and women's ultimate frisbee club teams.

The complex includes eight lighted multi-purpose grass fields and four lighted grass softball fields. The facility also includes locker rooms and spectator seating.

Planet Ice Skating and Hockey Arena
The Planet Ice Skating and Hockey Arena is an ice hockey rink in Lafayette, Louisiana that is the home game and practice rink for the LSU men's ice hockey team.

== LSU traditions ==
=== Mike the Tiger ===
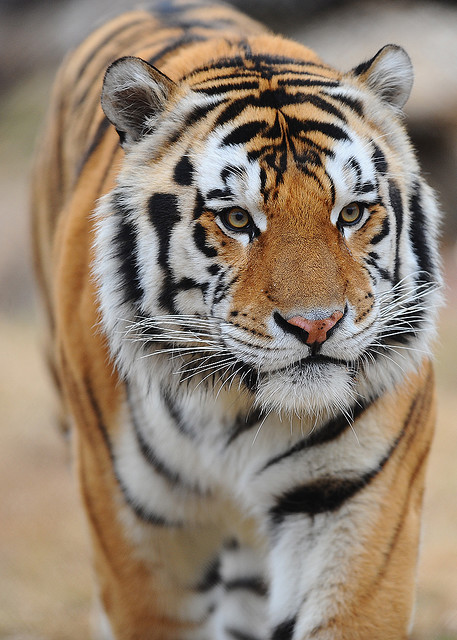
Mike the Tiger

Mike the Tiger is the official mascot of Louisiana State University in Baton Rouge, Louisiana and serves as the graphic image of LSU athletics. Mike is the name of both the live and costumed mascots. Mike the Tiger lives in a habitat (situated between Tiger Stadium and the Pete Maravich Assembly Center) which includes among its amenities lush plantings, a waterfall, a flowing stream that empties into a wading pond, and rocky plateaus.

=== School colors ===
LSU's official colors are Royal Purple and Old Gold. There is some discrepancy in the origin of LSU's current official colors. It is believed that purple and gold were first worn by an LSU team in the spring of 1893 when the LSU baseball squad beat Tulane in the first intercollegiate contest played in any sport by Louisiana State University.

In another story, before LSU's first ever football game, football coach/chemistry professor Dr. Charles E. Coates and some of his players purchased ribbon to adorn their gray jerseys as they prepared to play the first LSU football game versus Tulane. Stores were stocking ribbons in the colors of Mardi Gras—purple, gold and green—for the coming Carnival season. However, none of the green had arrived, so all of the purple and gold stock were purchased.

LSU's original school colors were white and blue chosen by Superintendent/President David F. Boyd (1865–1880).

=== "Fight for LSU" ===
"Fight for LSU" is the university's official fight song. The band plays "Fight for LSU" often, most notably when the team enters the field (while the band is in a tunnel formation at the end of its pregame performance), successfully kicks a field goal, scores an extra point, or completes a two-point conversion. Following a halftime performance, the band often exits the field while playing "Fight for LSU."

=== Louisiana State University Tiger Marching Band ===
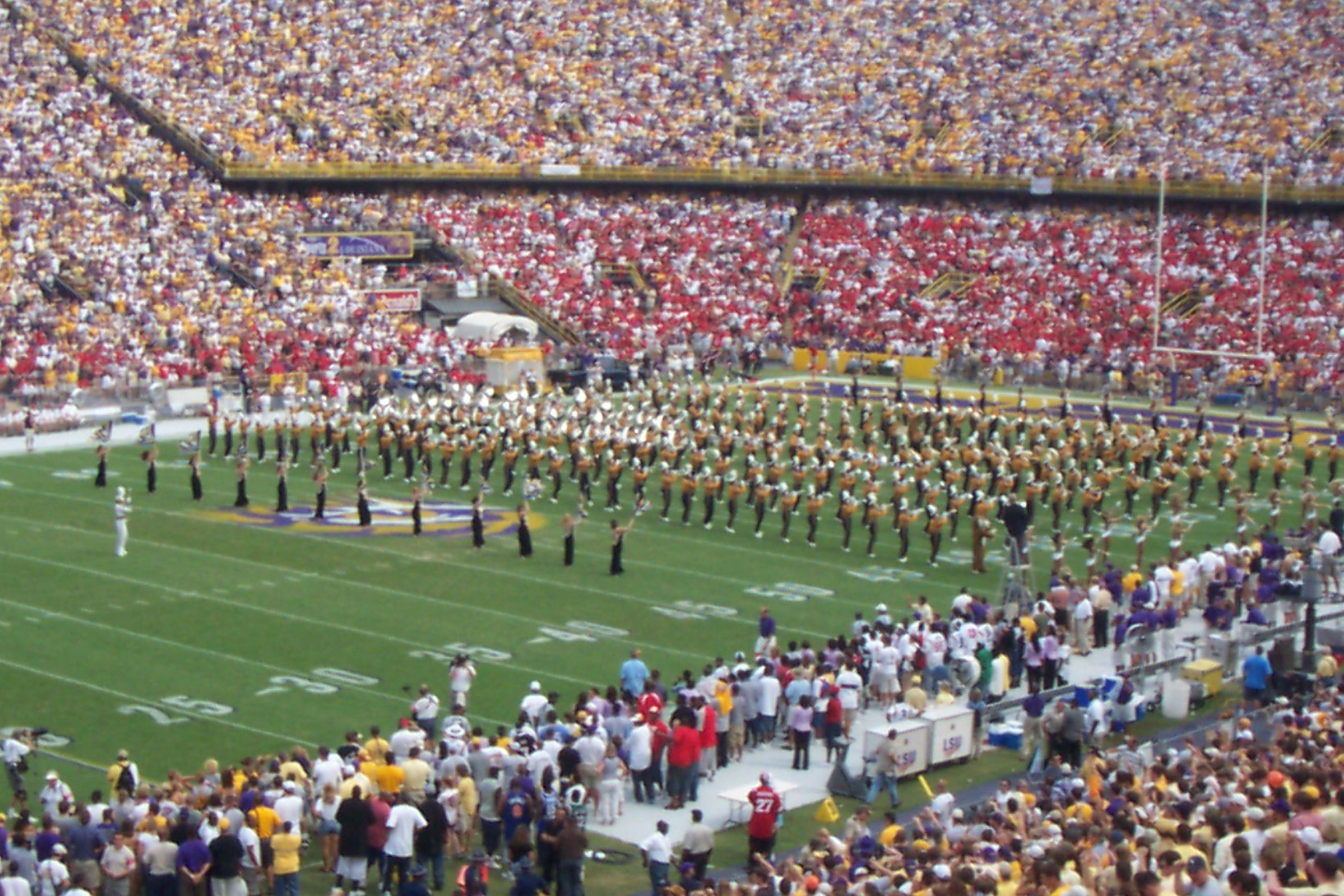
LSU Tiger Marching Band

The Louisiana State University Tiger Marching Band, also known as the Golden Band from Tigerland, is a 325-member ensemble. The band performs at LSU football home games, bowl games, and select away games. It also represents the university at various official functions and student events.

On football game days, the band marches from the band hall to Tiger Stadium, stopping along the way at Victory Hill, located right outside the stadium. "Thousands of fans lining North Stadium Drive listen for the cadence of drums announcing the band's departure from the Greek Theatre" and await the impending arrival of the band. The band stops on the hill and begins to play the opening strains of the "Pregame Salute." Then, while playing the introduction to "Touchdown for LSU," the band begins to run in tempo through the streets and down the hill amidst the crowd of cheering fans. The band also marches from the stadium to the band hall upon the conclusion of the game, a practice not usually employed by other bands.

One of the most celebrated traditions carried on by the band is its pregame performance at each home football game. The performance includes pieces from the band's expansive repertoire of school songs, including "Pregame Salute"/"Touchdown for LSU". The band begins the performance in the south end zone of the stadium and is called to attention by the drum major right before he marches out across the end zone in front of the band. Stopping at the goal line, the drum major wields his mace and uses his whistle to signal the band to take the field. The band marches out of the end zone to the beat of a single bass drum. The Golden Girls and color guard accompany the band on the field. The band stands at attention and then plays the opening chords of the salute (which are taken from the tune "Tiger Rag"), the band turns to face all four corners of the stadium. The crowd explodes in cheers. Once the band salutes each part of the stadium, the pace of the music and the marching picks up, the music transitions into Long's "Touchdown for LSU," and the band sweeps the field. Toward the end of the song, the band breaks the fronts and spells out "LSU."

In the "LSU" formation, the band plays the "LSU Alma Mater" and the "Star-Spangled Banner. The band then plays LSU's official fight song, "Fight for LSU" as it salutes both sides of the stadium. Upon switching formations, the band plays the second half of "Tiger Rag," which culminates in the crowd chanting "T-I-G-E-R-S, TIGERS!' in unison. This is followed the "First Down Cheer," to which the crowd in unison responds to each of the three refrains with "GEAUX! TIGERS!" and to the final refrain with "LSU!" The band immediately breaks into an encore performance of "Touchdown for LSU" as it marches to the north end zone, and then breaks to form a tunnel through which the football team will enter the field.

The band also performs on first, second, and third down when the Tigers are on offense. The "First Down Cheer" includes the "Hold that Tiger" musical phrase from "Tiger Rag." The "Third Down Cheer" is based on the song "Eye of the Tiger" made famous by Survivor. The piece, "Tiger Bandits" was created to pay homage to the defensive unit from the 1958 national championship football team. Coach Paul Dietzel called the unit the "Chinese Bandits." The title of the song was eventually changed to "Tiger Bandits" (or just simply "Bandits"). The band plays the song when the LSU defense forces the opposing team to give up possession of the football. With arms extended out, LSU fans bow to pay homage to the defensive stop.

=== Bengal Brass ===
The Bengal Brass is a group of 60 members selected from the ranks of the band constitute the Bengal Brass Basketball Band, often simply referred to as Bengal Brass. This group of all-brass musicians (and percussionist on a trap set) is often split into two squads—purple and gold—and performs at LSU select home volleyball matches, many home gymnastics meets, all home men's basketball, and all home women's basketball games in the Pete Maravich Assembly Center. Bengal Brass also travels with the men's and women's basketball teams during postseason play.

=== Golden Girls and Colorguard ===
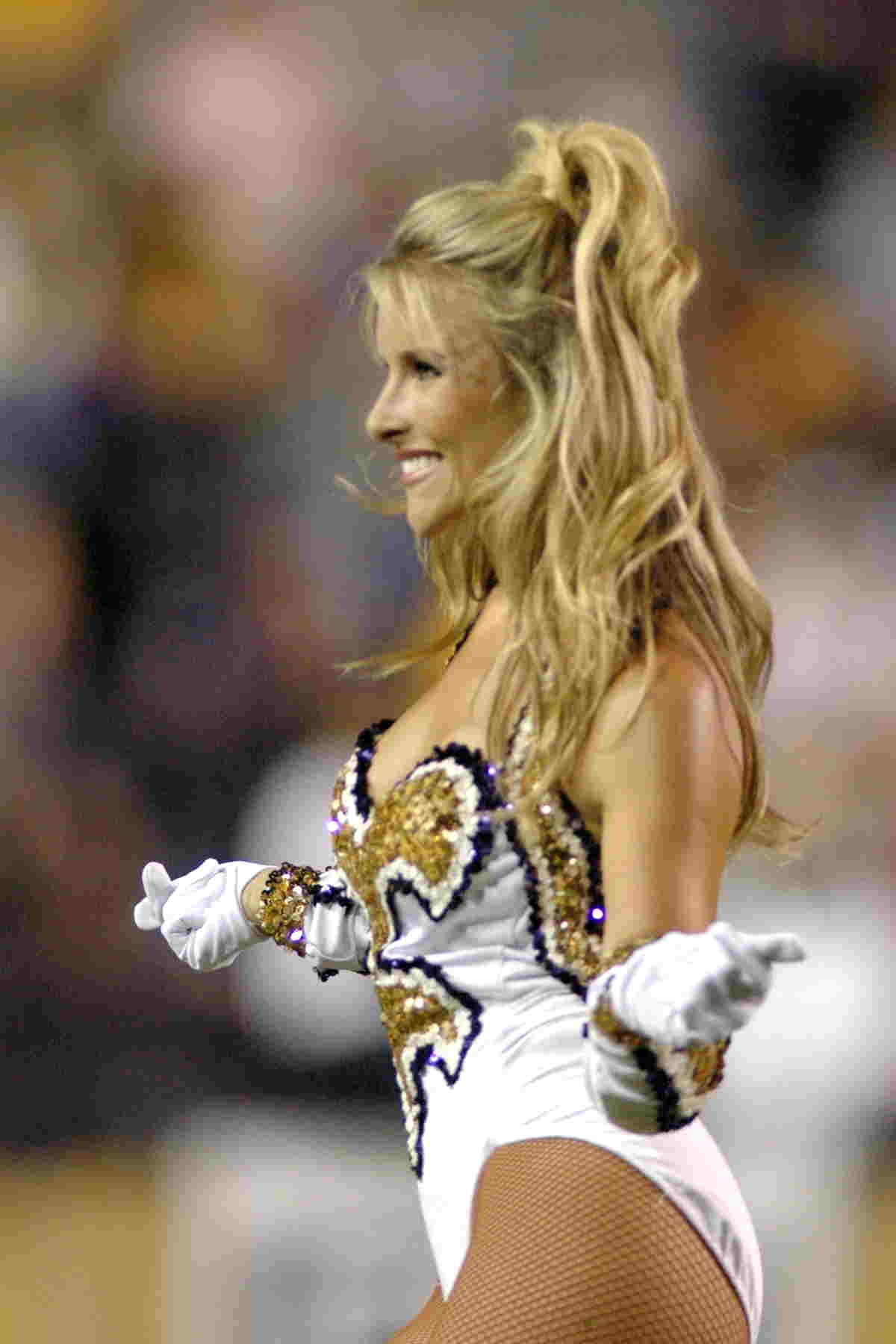
LSU Golden Girls

The LSU Golden Girls, a feature unit with the Tiger Band and the oldest and most established danceline on the LSU campus, was created in 1959 as the Ballet Corps by then director of bands Thomas Tyra. The Golden Girl moniker became official in 1965. Today, the line includes 14 to 18 dancers who audition each year to make the line and who are often members of private dance studios. The Golden Girls fall under the Department of Bands in the School of Music. Blair Buras Guillaume is the director of the team. Members must audition every year, and receive college credit for participation.

The LSU Colorguard, a flag twirling unit not to be confused with a traditional military colorguard, was established in 1971. Twenty-four to twenty- eight female twirlers are selected from an audition process.

=== LSU Cheerleaders ===
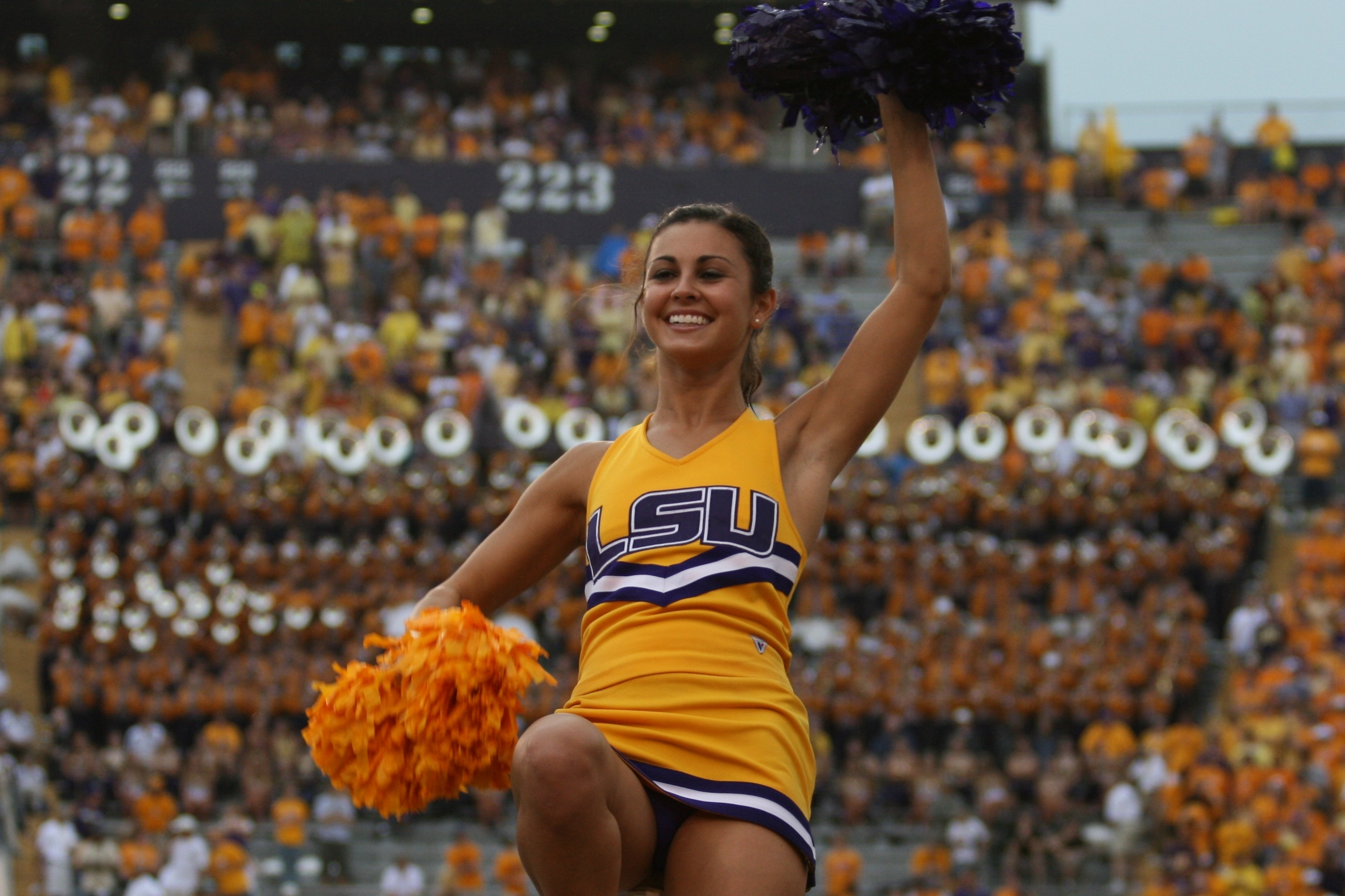
LSU Cheerleaders

The LSU Cheerleaders consist of both male and female cheerleaders that perform at LSU football and men's and women's basketball games. The cheerleaders lead the crowd in numerous cheers during game play and breaks. Prior to home football games the LSU cheerleaders ride atop Mike the Tiger's mobile unit, lead the crowd in cheers such as the "Geaux Tigers" cheer and lead the football team onto the field prior to the game and after halftime. The cheerleaders are located on both sidelines during football games and are located along the baseline for home basketball games. LSU's cheerleaders also compete against other universities cheerleading squads in competitions sanctioned by the Universal Cheerleaders Association (UCA). The 1989 Tiger cheerleaders won the UCA National Championship.

=== LSU Tiger Girls ===
The LSU Tiger Girls, were established as a danceline for the LSU men's and women's basketball teams. The all-female squad performs during all home games and other university and non-university sponsored functions. The Tiger Girls also compete against other universities dance teams in competitions sanctioned by the Universal Dance Association (UDA).

=== LSU Bat Girls ===
The LSU Bat Girls are a support squad that contributes to the LSU Baseball program. The Bat Girls consist of 30 individuals who work in teams of 10 at all home games, post-season games and various charity events. The squad serves as hostesses at Alex Box Stadium, Skip Bertman Field and their responsibilities include selling game day programs, recovering foul balls, retrieving bats and helmets, answering fans questions, assisting with game day promotions and giveaways and checking on umpires. They also assist the athletic department with many different aspects of the game such as attending coaches committee meetings.

== Rivalries ==
=== Football ===
Traditional rivals for the LSU Tigers football team include long running rivalries with the Ole Miss Rebels and Tulane Green Wave. More current football rivalries include the Alabama Crimson Tide, Arkansas Razorbacks, Auburn Tigers, Florida Gators, Mississippi State Bulldogs and Texas A&M Aggies.

== LSU Athletic Hall of Fame ==
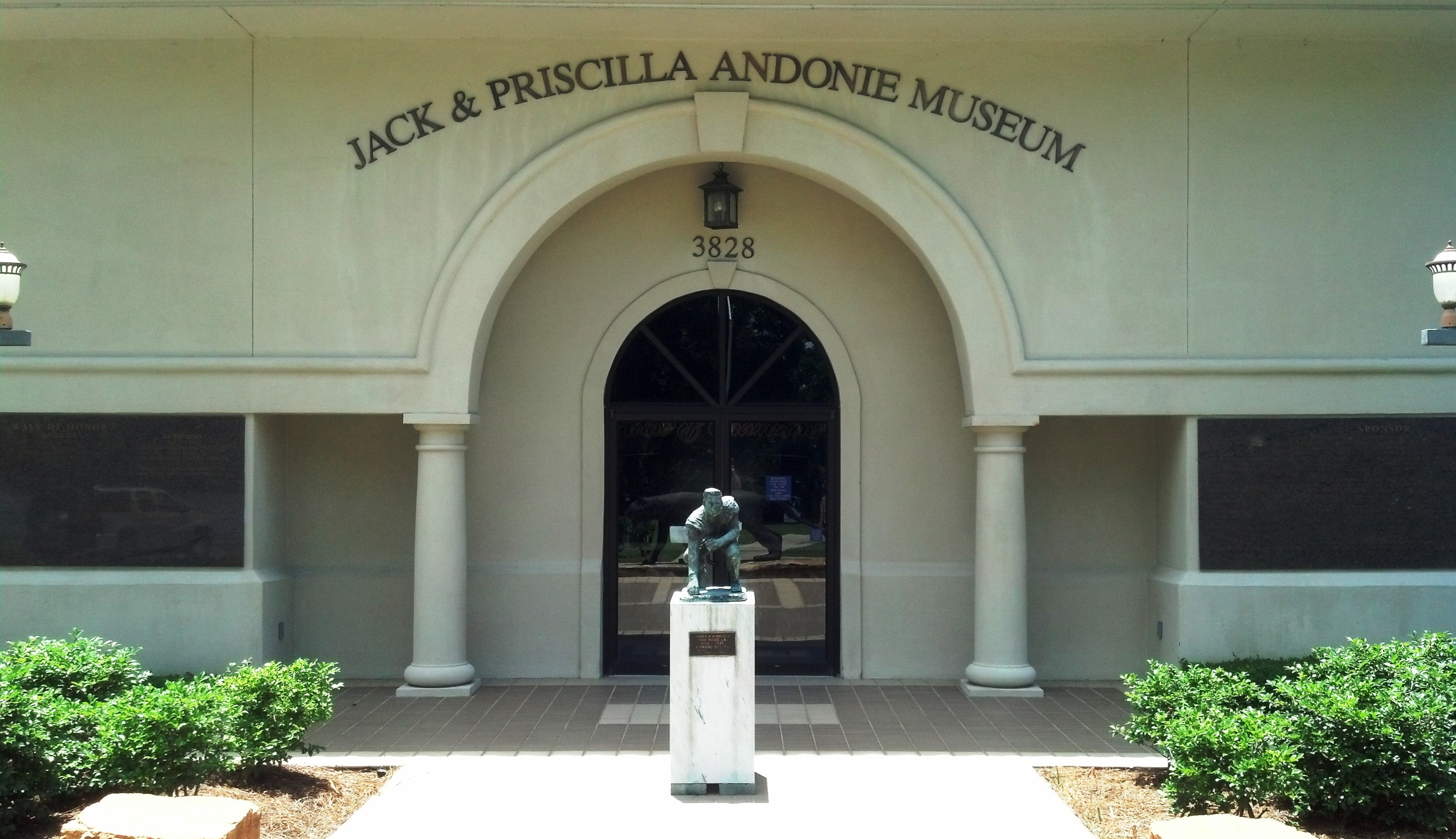
LSU Athletic Hall of Fame - Jack and Priscilla Andonie Museum

The Louisiana State University Athletic Hall of Fame recognizes members of the athletics program that have made a lasting impact on the university. To be eligible for the LSU Hall of Fame in the Athlete category, an individual must have earned a college degree and gained national distinction through superlative performance. Hall of Fame candidates must also have established a personal reputation for character and citizenship. To be eligible in the Coach/Administrator category, the individual must have made significant contributions to LSU Athletics and gained national distinction through exceptional accomplishments in his or her field of expertise while establishing an image that reflects favorably upon the university.

The Jack and Priscilla Andonie Museum located on the campus of LSU in Baton Rouge, Louisiana is the physical location of the Louisiana State University Athletic Hall of Fame.

== Tiger Athletic Foundation ==
The Tiger Athletic Foundation or TAF is a private, non-profit corporation dedicated to supporting Louisiana State University (LSU) and its athletics program. It is the primary source of private funding for LSU athletics and contributions to TAF benefit every athlete and every team at LSU. TAF has become a critical element in the success of LSU Athletics by providing private funding for scholarships, academic rewards, new athletic facilities and facility upgrades. In addition to contributions to the athletic scholarship fund, TAF will continue to provide funding for academic programs and facilities that benefit all LSU students.

== Athletic directors ==
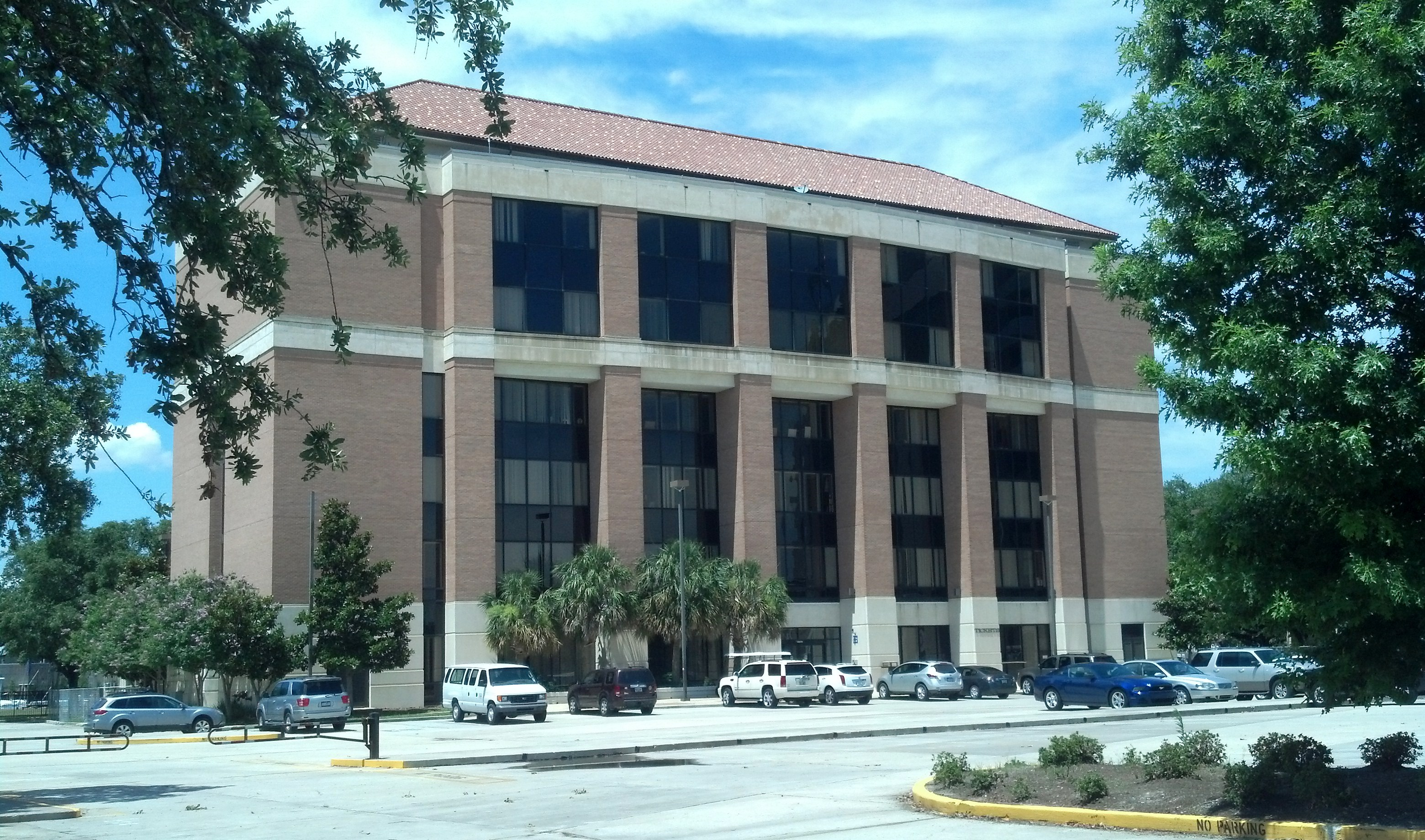
LSU Athletics Administration Building

#	Name	Years served
1	Russ Cohen	1928–1931
2	T.P. "Skipper" Heard	1931–1954
3	Jim Corbett	1954–1967
4	Harry Rabenhorst	1967–1968
5	Carl Maddox	1968–1978
6	Paul Dietzel	1978–1982
7	Bob Brodhead	1982–1987
8	Joe Dean	1987–2000
9	Skip Bertman	2001–2008
10	Joe Alleva	2008–2019
11	Scott Woodward	2019–2025
12	Verge Ausberry	2025–present

== Broadcast information ==
The LSU Sports Radio Network's flagship station for men's sports is WDGL-FM ("The Eagle 98.1") in Baton Rouge and the flagship station for women's sports is WBRP-FM (Talk 107.3) in Baton Rouge.

=== Current ===
As of the 2017–18 season:

Name	Position
Chris Blair	Play-by-play (baseball, men's basketball, football); Director of Broadcasting
Doug Thompson	Analyst (baseball, home games)
Bill Franques	Analyst (baseball, away games)
John Brady	Analyst (men's basketball)
Kevin Ford	Analyst/play-by-play (men's basketball); Studio host (football)
Jacob Hester	Analyst (football)
Gordy Rush	Sideline reporter (football)
Patrick Wright	Play-by-play (women's basketball, softball)
Kent Lowe	Analyst (softball)

=== Former "Voice of the Tigers" ===
- John Ferguson – Play-by-play commentator (men's basketball, football) (1946–1958, 1961–1987)
- J.C. Politz – Play-by-play commentator (men's basketball, football) (1959–1960)
- Jim Hawthorne – Play-by-play commentator (baseball, men's basketball, football) (1979–2016)

== See also ==
- Bengal Punch
- List of NCAA Division I institutions
- List of NCAA schools with the most Division I national championships
