= Pat Newman =

Pat Newman may refer to:

- Pat Newman (tennis) (1939–2022), tennis coach
- Pat Newman (rowing) (born 1963)
- Pat Newman (American football) (born 1968)
