= Bahnsen =

Bahnsen is a German surname. Notable people with the surname include:

- David L. Bahnsen (born 1974), American portfolio manager, author, and television commentator
- Greg Bahnsen (1948–1995), Calvinist philosopher, apologist, and debater
- John Bahnsen (1934–2024), United States Army general
- Julius Bahnsen (1830–1881), German philosopher
- Karen Bahnsen (born 1960), American college golf coach and former player
- Ken Bahnsen (born 1930), American football player
- Stan Bahnsen (born 1944), Major League Baseball pitcher
- Uwe Bahnsen (1930–2013), German car designer
