= Phillip Campbell =

American tennis coach

Coaching career
- Lady Tigers (1984-1989)

Phillip Campbell is the former head coach of the women's tennis program at Louisiana State University. Campbell succeeded Betty Sue Hagerman in 1984 and recorded an overall record of 79–49 in five seasons as head coach of the Lady Tigers. He was succeeded by Geoff Macdonald.
