= Bengal Punch =

American sports drink brand

- Product type: Sports drink
- Current owner: Bud Adams
- Country: United States
- Introduced: 1958; 68 years ago
- Markets: United States
- Previous owners: Dr. Martin J. Broussard

Bengal Punch was a sports drink created in 1958 for the Louisiana State University football team. It is believed to be the first sports drink ever created, pre-dating Gatorade by seven years. It was created by Dr. Martin J. Broussard, the long-time LSU athletic trainer who served the university from the mid-1940s until the early 1990s.

Bengal Punch later became a flavor of Quickick sports drinks. The brand was popular throughout the Southeastern US with its main base as Louisiana and Texas. Quickick was formerly owned by Bud Adams, co-founder of the American Football League and former owner of the Houston Oilers, Tennessee Oilers and Tennessee Titans. The ownership of Quickick later resided with a group of businessmen based in Baton Rouge, Louisiana operating as QK Brands. Until 2000, Quickick was bottled and distributed by various Coca-Cola, Dr. Pepper and several other bottlers. After 2000, Quickick brought bottling and distribution in-house and all operations and facilities were located in Baton Rouge, Louisiana.

== See also ==
- LSU Tigers and Lady Tigers
- LSU Tigers football
- LSU Sports
