= Geoff Macdonald =

American tennis coach

- Country (sports): United States
- Born: June 5, 1958 (age 66)

Singles
- Highest ranking: No. 314 (January 3, 1983)

Doubles
- Career record: 2–5
- Highest ranking: No. 229 (January 3, 1983)

Grand Slam doubles results
- US Open: 1R (1982)

Geoff Macdonald (born June 5, 1958) is the current head coach of the women's tennis team at Vanderbilt University.

== Coaching career ==
Macdonald is the former women's tennis head coach at Louisiana State University. Macdonald succeeded Phillip Campbell in 1988 and recorded an overall record of 50–24 in three seasons as head coach of the Lady Tigers. His teams played in one NCAA Tournament, reaching the Final 20 in 1991. He was named the SEC coach of the year in 1991. He was succeeded by Tony Minnis.
