= Tony Minnis =

Tony Minnis was the head women's tennis coach at Louisiana State University from 1992 to 2011. His father, Howard, was the former head tennis coach at Southern University. His sister, Patricia, played tennis at LSU from 1988 to '91, and his brother, Patrick, is a former No. 1 singles player at University of Louisiana at Lafayette.

Minnis played high school tennis at Redemptorist High School in Baton Rouge and collegiately for UL Lafayette. As a player, Minnis competed in the 1988 NCAA Team Championships and was a semifinalist at the NIT in 1986. During his four years, the Ragin' Cajuns had a 78–39 overall record and finished each year ranked in the Top 25. In his senior season, UL Lafayette was ranked 15th in the final polls and advanced to the second round of the NCAA Championships. He graduated from UL Lafayette in 1988 with a degree in finance and earned an MBA in 1996.

Minnis succeeded Geoff Macdonald as head coach of LSU in 1992. Entering the 2008 season, his overall record stands at 208–162 in 15 seasons as head coach of the Tigers. His teams have played in 11 consecutive NCAA Tournaments. He was named the 1997 SEC Coach of the Year and is the winningest women's tennis coach in LSU history, with over 250 wins.
