= Karen Elliot =

American tennis coach

Karen McCarter Elliot is the former head coach of the women's tennis program at Louisiana State University. Elliot succeeded Pat Newman in 1980 and recorded an overall record of 22–13 in one season as head coach of the Lady Tigers, including the Louisiana AIAW Championship in 1980. She was succeeded by Betty Sue Hagerman.
