= Karen Bahnsen =

American college golfer, college golf coach

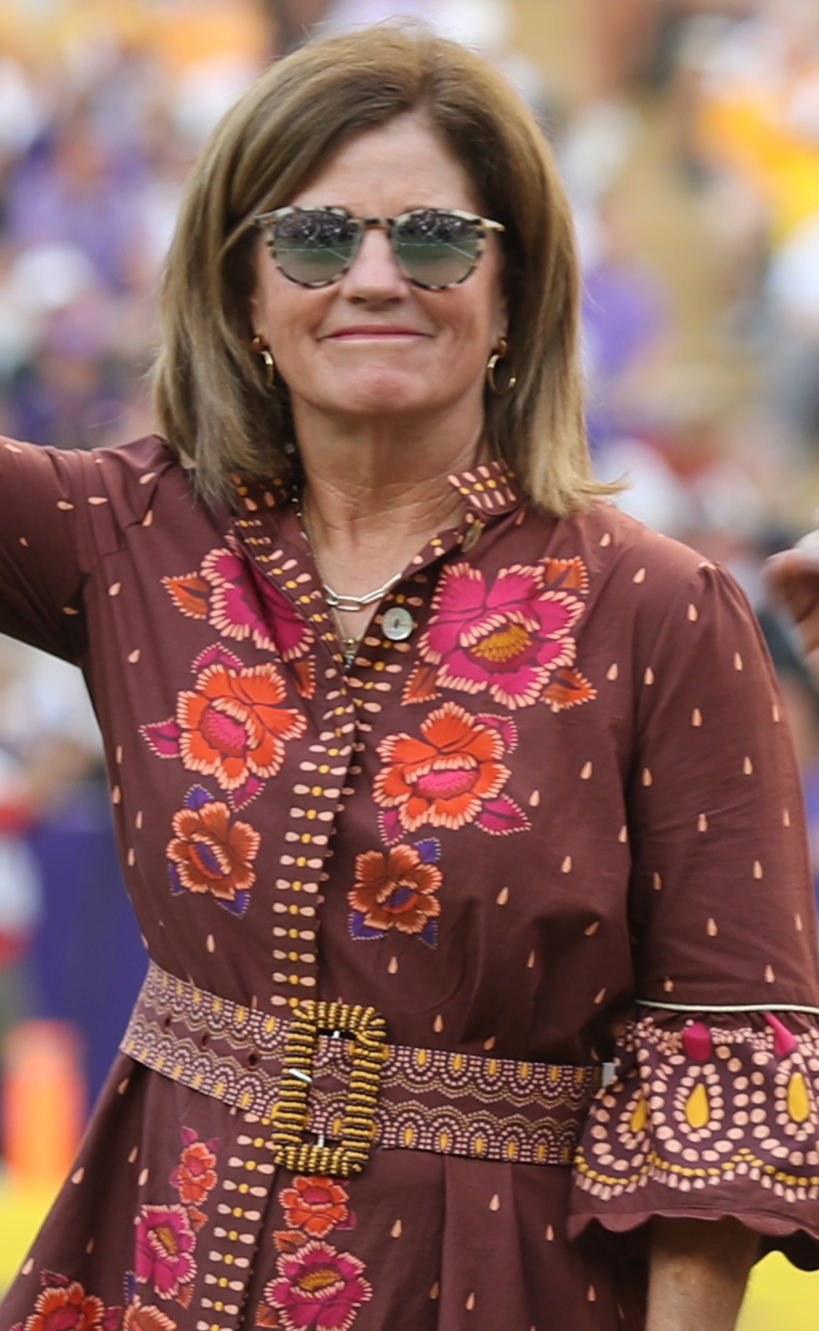
- Bahnsen in 2023

Current position
- Title: Head coach
- Conference: Southeastern Conference

Biographical details
- Born: October 11, 1960 (age 65); Mobile, Alabama, U.S.

Playing career
- 1980–1983: LSU

Coaching career (HC unless noted)
- 1985–2018: LSU

Accomplishments and honors

Championships
- SEC (1992)

Awards
- NGCA Coaches Hall of Fame (2009)

Karen Mayson Bahnsen (born October 11, 1960) is an American former college golf coach and player from the United States.

== Early years ==
Bahnsen was born in Mobile, Alabama. She attended McGill-Toolen Catholic High School in Mobile.

== College career ==
Bahnsen was the first women's golfer to receive an athletic scholarship to attend LSU in Baton Rouge, Louisiana, where she played for the Lady Tigers golf team from 1980 to 1983. As a Tiger, she participated in two Association for Intercollegiate Athletics for Women (AIAW) and one National Collegiate Athletic Association (NCAA) nation championship tournaments.

== Coaching career ==
Bahnsen was head coach of the Lady Tigers from 1985 to 2018. Her teams recorded twenty-eight team titles and twenty-eight individual titles. Her 1992 Lady Tigers won the 1992 SEC championship, and have qualified for the NCAA Championship Tournament eleven times, including 1986, 1996, 1998, 1999, 2000, 2001, 2006, 2008, 2009, 2010 and 2011.

Bahnsen's 2011 team finished third in the NCAA national championship tournament, and golfer Austin Ernst won the NCAA individual championship. The Lady Tigers placed third of twelve teams in the SEC Tournament, and Ernst placed ninth in the individual standings.

The National Golf Coaches Association (NGCA) inducted Bahnsen into its Coaches Hall of Fame in 2009.

On May 25, 2018, it was announced that Bahnsen was stepping down as LSU women's golf coach and was taking a position in the Tiger Athletic Foundation.

== Personal ==
She is married to David "Bo" Bahnsen, a senior associate athletic director at LSU. They have a son and a daughter.
