= Mango's Beach Volleyball Club =

Beach volleyball venue in Baton Rouge, Louisiana

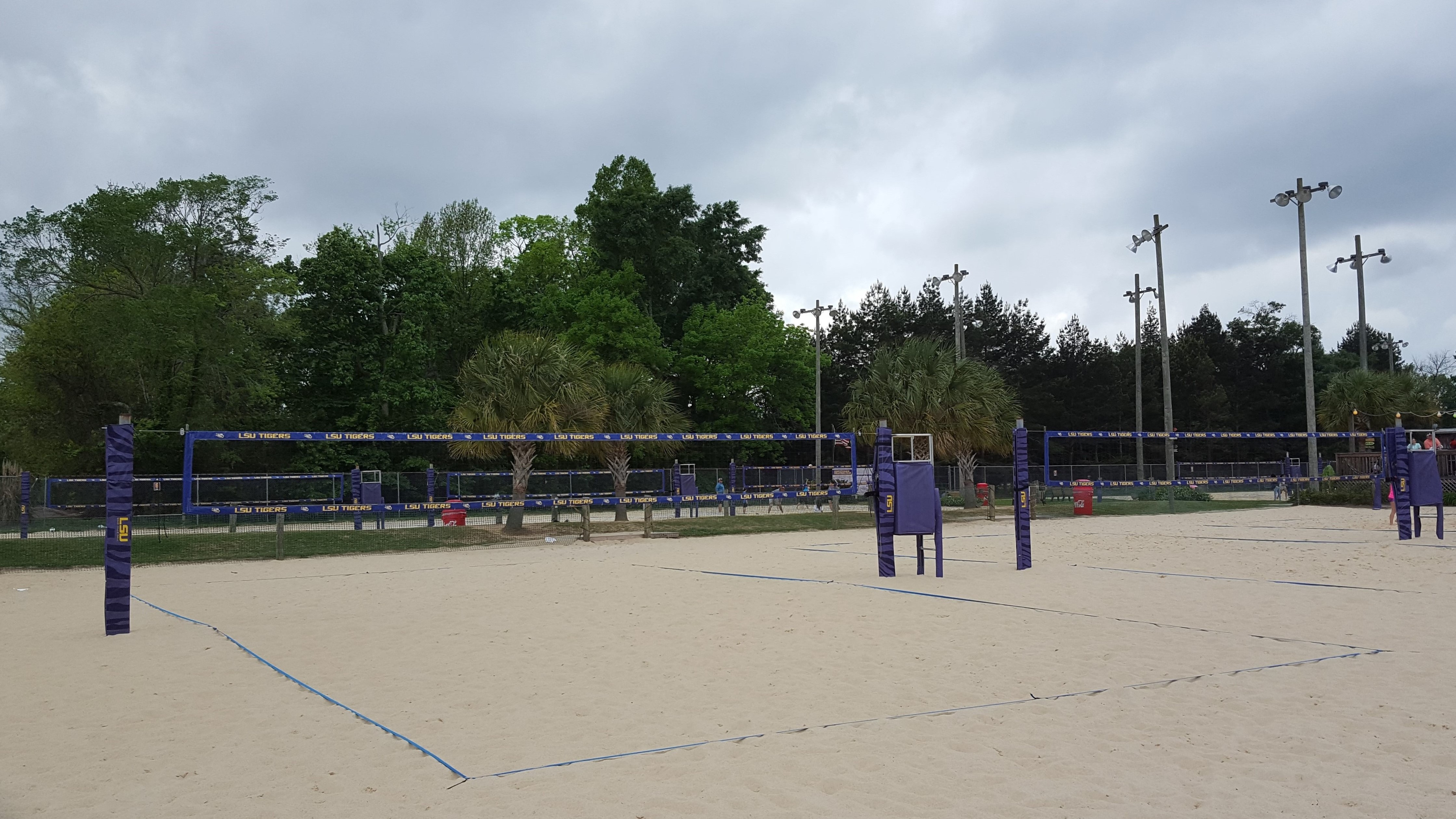
- Interactive map of Mango's Beach Volleyball Club
- Location: 11550 W. Bricksome Ave. Baton Rouge, Louisiana 70816; United States
- Coordinates: 30.4241°N 91.0538°W

Construction
- Opened: 1995

Tenant
- LSU Tigers women's beach volleyball (NCAA) (2014–2018)

Mango's Beach Volleyball Club is a beach volleyball facility located in Baton Rouge, Louisiana. The facility, built in 1995, hosts local leagues and volleyball tournaments.

The club features 13 sand courts, with league matches taking place on weekdays and tournaments commonly scheduled on weekends. Mango's runs its activities across three main seasons: spring, summer, and fall.

== History ==
It opened with three sand and three grass courts and has since expanded four-times to 13 sand courts.

It served as the home of the LSU Tigers women's beach volleyball team from 2014 to 2018 prior to their move to the on-campus LSU Beach Volleyball Stadium in 2019.

Notably, Taryn Kloth and Kristen Nuss have trained consistently at Mango's, including during their training leading up to the 2024 Summer Olympics. They are also known to attend multiple events held at Mango's each year.

== Gallery ==
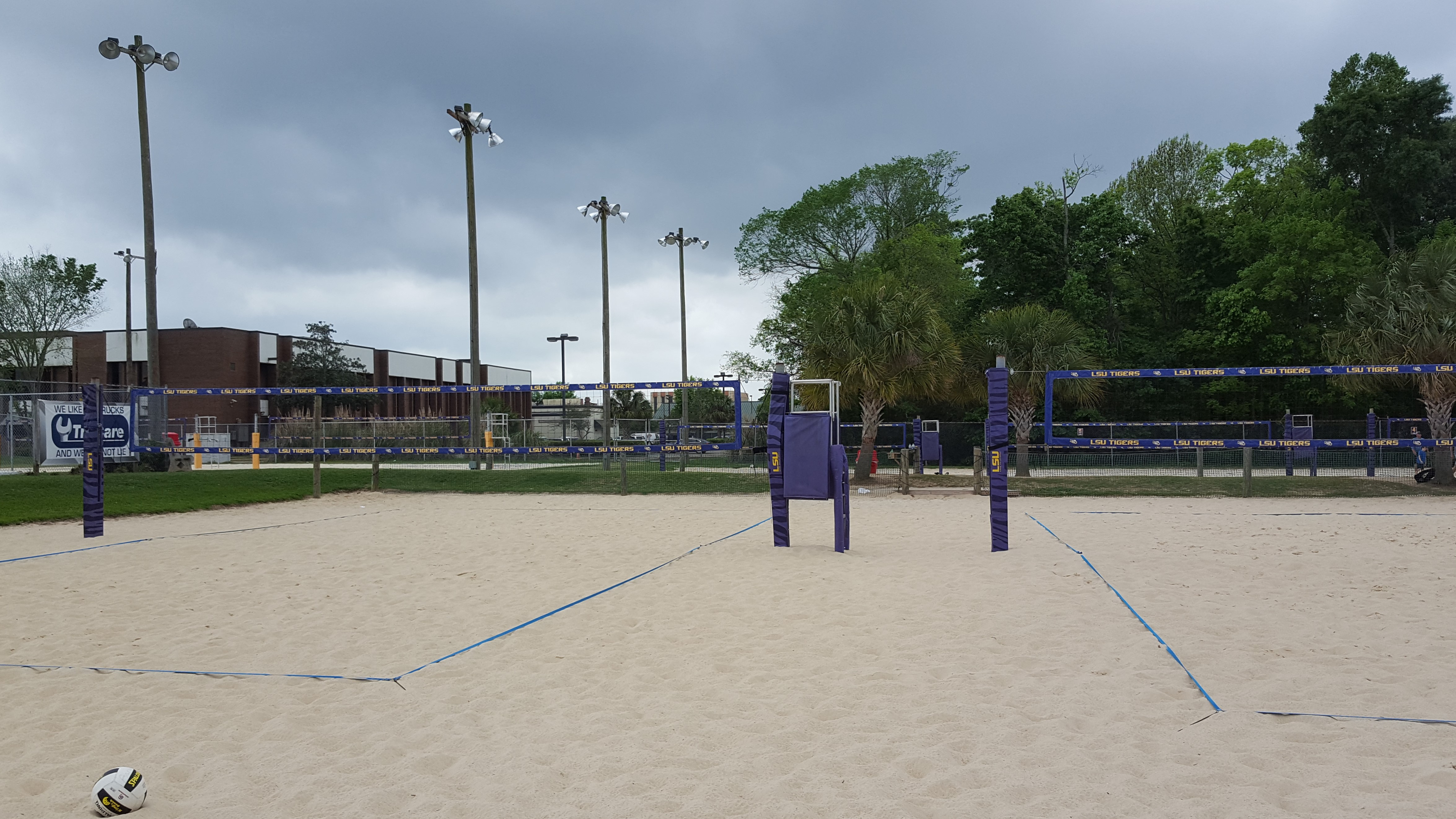
LSU Tigers beach volleyball courts

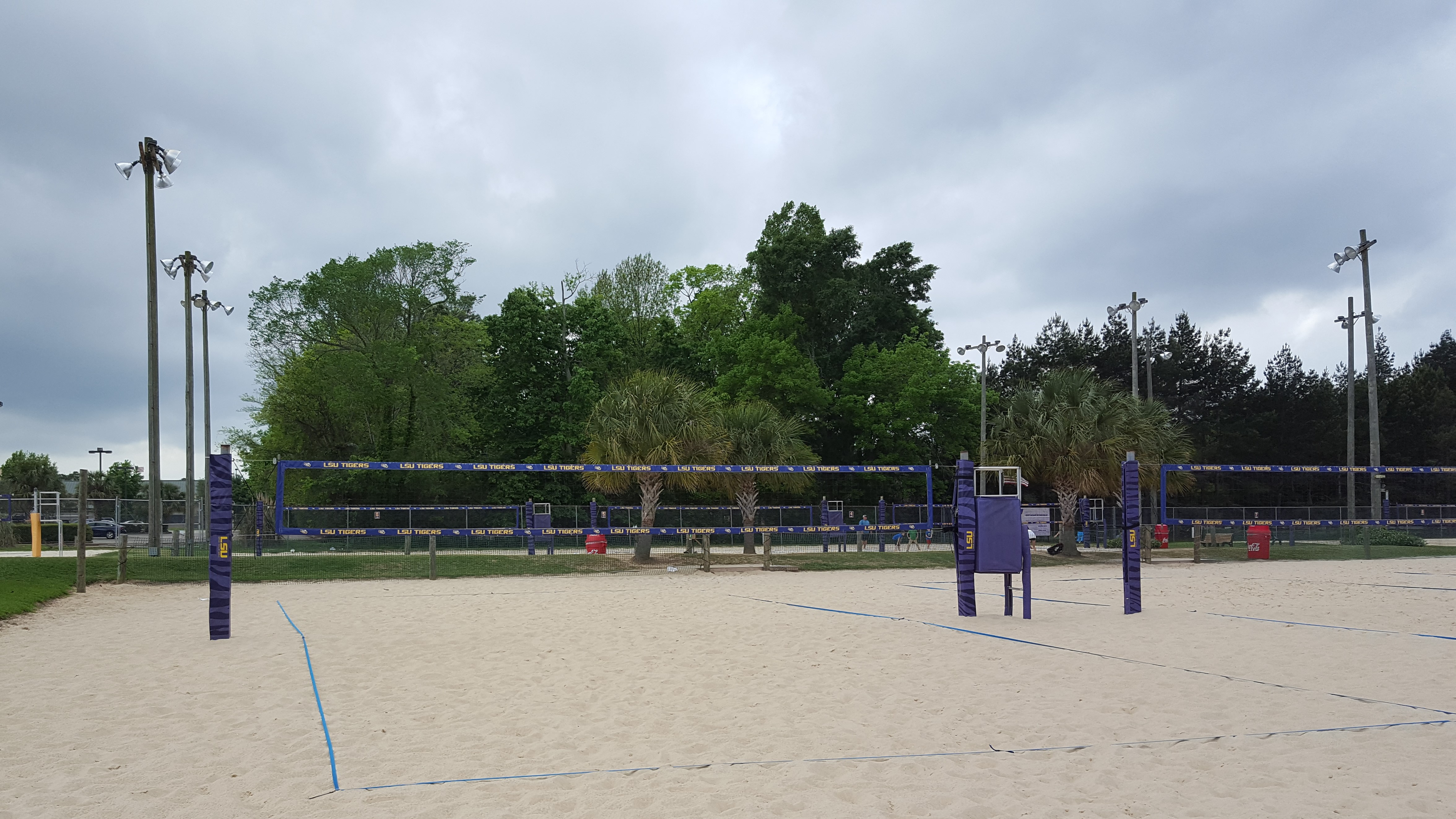
LSU Tigers beach volleyball court at Mango's
