= Betty Sue Hagerman =

American tennis coach

Betty Sue Hagerman Welch (born 1948) is the former head coach of the women's tennis program at Louisiana State University. Hagerman succeeded Karen Elliot in 1981 and recorded an overall record of 40–36 in three seasons as head coach of the Lady Tigers, including the Louisiana AIAW Championship in 1981. She was succeeded by Phillip Campbell. She was the 1993 USPTA National High School Tennis Coach of the Year, and she was inducted into the Texas Tennis Hall of Fame in 1999.

Hagerman graduated from Highland Park High School in Dallas in 1966. She married computer programmer David A. Welch. Her husband died in 2023.
