= Pat Newman (tennis) =

American tennis coach (1939–2022)

Patricia Anne Newman (December 2, 1939 – April 9, 2022) was the first head women's tennis coach at Louisiana State University, United States. Newman recorded an overall record of 71–24 in four seasons as head coach of the Lady Tigers, including the Louisiana AIAW Championships in 1976, 1977, and 1978. Her team was the Louisiana AIAW Runner-Up in 1979. She was succeeded by Karen Elliot. Newman died on April 9, 2022.
