= United States Intercollegiate Boxing Association =

Amateur boxing league

- Abbreviation: USIBA
- Formation: 2012; 14 years ago
- Legal status: Association
- Headquarters: Lexington, Kentucky, U.S.
- Region served: United States
- Website: collegeboxing.org

The United States Intercollegiate Boxing Association (USIBA) is a nonprofit amateur collegiate boxing league founded in 2012 and formed, in part, to address perceived safety and fairness issues present in the National Collegiate Boxing Association (such as matching up boxers with significant skill or experience disparities), and to generally organize the sport at a collegiate level more adequately. The USIBA was also the first organization to hold national collegiate-level women's boxing championships in the United States (the subject of which had been another point of contention with the NCBA), beginning with their inaugural national tournament in 2013.

The association is an affiliate of USA Boxing.

== Participating schools ==
Current schools:

- Alverno College
- California State Polytechnic University, Pomona
- Cornell University
- Georgetown University
- George Washington University
- Georgia State University
- Georgia Tech
- Olivet College
- Syracuse University
- Texas A&M University
- Towson University
- UC Davis
- UC Riverside
- University of Illinois
- University of Kansas
- University of Maryland
- University of Miami
- University of Michigan
- University of San Francisco
- University of Southern California
- University of Texas Rio Grande Valley
- University of Washington
- University of Wisconsin
- Vanderbilt University
- Virginia Military Institute
- Wake Forest University
- Washington and Lee University
- Western State Colorado University
- Xavier University

Former schools:

- UCLA (joined the NCBA after the 2015 season)
- United States Military Academy (women's team only; joined the NCBA after the 2015 season)

== Weight Classes ==
The USIBA closely follows the weight classes prescribed by USA Boxing, though does not name the classes, instead referring to them only by the weight itself. Not all weight classes are necessarily contested at each national tournament.

Weight class limit (lbs/kg)
Men	Women
—	106 lb (48.1 kg)
108 lb (49.0 kg)	-
112 lb (50.8 kg)	112 lb (50.8 kg)
114 lb (51.7 kg)	-
119 lb (54.0 kg)	119 lb (54.0 kg)
125 lb (56.7 kg)	125 lb (56.7 kg)
132 lb (59.9 kg)	132 lb (59.9 kg)
141 lb (64.0 kg)	141 lb (64.0 kg)
152 lb (68.9 kg)	152 lb (68.9 kg)
165 lb (74.8 kg)	165 lb (74.8 kg)
178 lb (80.7 kg)	178 lb (80.7 kg)
—	178+ lbs
189 lb (85.7 kg)	—
201 lb (91.2 kg)	—
225 lb (102.1 kg)	—
225+ lbs	—

== National Tournament ==
In the national tournament, boxers are divided into three classes: Beginner (0-2 sanctioned bouts), Novice (0-9 bouts), and Elite (5+ bouts), as per USA Boxing rules. The experience division plays into the final team scoring system, in which more experienced boxers earn more points for their team. This structure also allows for the possibility of, for example, a boxer winning a Beginner championship and then competing for a Novice title later in the tournament, usually on the final day.

=== Team scoring ===
Quarterfinal wins:

- Beginners earn 1 point for their team
- Novices earn 2 points for their team
- Elites earn 3 points for their team

Semifinal wins:

- Beginners earn 2 point for their team
- Novices earn 3 points for their team
- Elites earn 4 points for their team

Championship wins:

- Beginners earn 3 point for their team
- Novices earn 4 points for their team
- Elites earn 5 points for their team

== National Team Champions ==
Champions are as follows:

Year	Host	Men	Women	Notes
2013	University of San Francisco	UC Davis	U.S. Military Academy	Army also won the very first individual national collegiate women's boxing title.
2014	University of Miami	University of Michigan	U.S. Military Academy	
2015	University of Michigan	Virginia Military Institute	University of Michigan	Final USIBA appearances of the UCLA and USMA women's teams before joining the NCBA
2016	California State University, Northridge	Olivet College	University of Michigan	
2017	Virginia Military Institute	Michigan		First tournament sweep by a single school
2018	University of Illinois Urbana-Champaign	Illinois Urbana-Champaign	University of Michigan	
2019	Syracuse University	Illinois Urbana-Champaign	Georgetown University	
2020	No tournament held			Cancelled due to the COVID-19 pandemic. Host was to be Georgia Tech.
2021	No tournament held			Cancelled due to the COVID-19 pandemic.
2022	Atlanta Marriott Northeast/Emory Area	Virginia Military Institute	Illinois Urbana-Champaign	
2023	Virginia Military Institute	Illinois Urbana-Champaign	UC Riverside	
2024	Sheraton North Houston	Washington		
2025	City of Macon	Illinois Urbana-Champaign		
2026	University of Nevada–Las Vegas	UC Riverside	University of Michigan	

National Men's Championships by School
Illinois Urbana-Champaign	4
University Michigan; Virginia Military Institute	2
Olivet College; UC Davis; UC Riverside; University of Washington	1

National Women's Championships by School
University of Michigan	5
U.S. Military Academy; Illinois Urbana-Champaign	2
Georgetown University; UC Riverside; University of Washington	1

== See also ==
- College club sports in the United States
- Collegiate Nationals
- NCAA Boxing Championship
- National Collegiate Boxing Association
