= Dave Geyer =

American college swimming coach (born 1977)

Current position
- Title: Swimming head coach
- Team: LSU
- Conference: Southeastern Conference (SEC)

Biographical details
- Born: March 15, 1977 (age 49); Pittsburgh, Pennsylvania

Coaching career (HC unless noted)
- 2002–2005: Mecklenburg Aquatics Club (Asst.)
- 2006–2010: LSU (Asst.)
- 2011–present: LSU (Swim HC)

Accomplishments and honors

Championships
- 1 SEC Champion

Dave Geyer (born March 15, 1977) is an American college swimming coach. He is the current co-head coach of the LSU Tigers and LSU Lady Tigers swimming and diving teams at Louisiana State University with responsibilities for the swim team. Doug Shaffer is head coach of the diving team.

== Coaching career ==
Geyer has been the co-head coach of the LSU Tigers and Lady Tigers swimming and diving teams since 2011 when he was promoted from LSU assistant to head swim coach. He was an assistant coach at LSU from 2006 to 2010. Prior to LSU, he was an assistant swim coach at the Mecklenburg Aquatics Club (now known as SwimMAC Carolina). SwimMac Carolina is a United States Olympic Committee Center of Excellence.

In 2008, Geyer was a member of the Estonian National coaching staff at the European Short-Course Championships.

== Education ==
Geyer was a swimmer at Shippensburg University of Pennsylvania. He placed at the Pennsylvania State Athletic Conference (PSAC) Championships in all four of his competitive seasons. He earned All-American honors at the 1997 National Championships. He was a three-time PSAC runner-up in individual medley competition.

== See also ==
- LSU Tigers
