= LSU Cox Communications Academic Center for Student-Athletes =

Building of Louisiana State University

Coordinates: 30.414333°N 91.182672°W

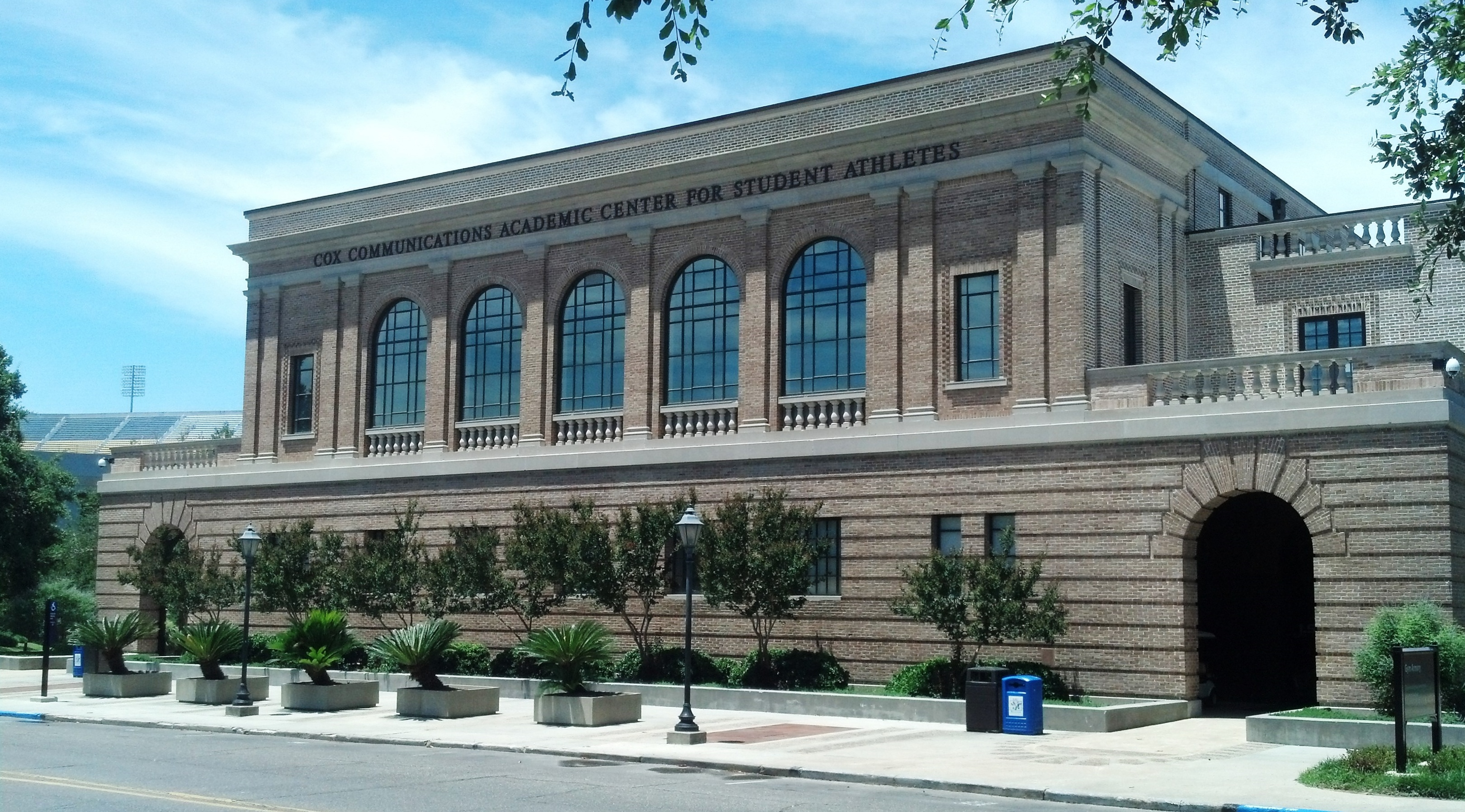
LSU Cox Communications Academic Center for Student-Athletes

The LSU Cox Communications Academic Center for Student-Athletes, on the campus of Louisiana State University in Baton Rouge, Louisiana, is located in the Gym/Armory building. The building opened in 1930 and was completely renovated and reopened in 2002 to house the Academic Center for Student-Athletes.

The goal of the academic center is to offer a comprehensive framework tailored to improve the academic skill set of each student-athlete. The 54,000 square foot Academic Center for Student-Athletes is complete with an entry/atrium, 1,000-seat Bo Campbell auditorium, computer labs, instructional technology lab, resource library with tech center, study area, tutorial center, meeting rooms, classrooms, student learning center, Shaquille O'Neal life skills labs and offices, Eric Hill communications studio, career center and Academic Hall of Fame.

== Computing facilities ==
=== Academic Center of Excellence computer labs ===
The Academic Center computer lab offers 45 computer workstations and the Mezzanine lab offers study carrels and computer workstations

=== Library Tech Center ===
Group study area with computer access

=== Tutorial Center ===
Offers cubicles for tutoring sessions with computer access

=== Student Learning Center ===
Technology workstation area

=== Shaquille O'Neal Life Skills lab ===
Offers career advisement and professional resume production

=== Eric Hill communications studio ===
Offers video production equipment and teaches courses on communication skills and business etiquette

== Services ==
Athlete academic monitoring and iPads are available for LSU student-athletes

== Career/Professional development ==
The Shaquille O'Neal Life Skills program was developed to teach skills in career/professional development throughout a students career.

== History ==
=== Academic Center history ===
In 2000, an idea was floated to create an academic center that would house an academic support program that would blend state-of-the-art technology with an appropriate study environment. LSU looked to Richard Manship, longtime Tiger football booster and CEO of Capital City Press and WBRZ-TV, to head the fundraising for the massive project. Manship, along with the Tiger Athletic Foundation, put together the Academic Center Development Council who was in charge of locating donors. Together with a $5.5 million donation by Cox Communications, more than $14 million was donated by private contributors and supporters of LSU Athletics. In November 2002, the LSU Cox Communications Academic Center for Student-Athletes idea came to fruition.

=== Building history ===
After Huey P. Long became Governor of Louisiana in 1928, he worked with LSU President Thomas Wilson Atkinson to find ways to obtain funding to build new facilities on LSU's campus. A priority was placed on a facility for large student gatherings. President Atkinson proposed a combination Gym/Armory and secured $250,000 from the Louisiana legislature for its construction.

Completed in 1930 and built on the edge of the bluff, the main floor was the gymnasium and the lower floor was the armory. Both floors were located on ground level. The gymnasium had a stage at one end and could be converted into an auditorium by placing four thousand folding chairs on the gymnasium floor and another fifteen hundred in the balcony. When not set up as an auditorium, it provided an open space for basketball games, dances and other events. The second floor provided space for locker rooms, a trophy room and a dance studio.

The Gym/Armory was home to the LSU Tigers basketball team after it moved from the old downtown campus. It was replaced by the John M. Parker Agricultural Coliseum in 1937, though for several years both the Gym/Armory and the coliseum were used for LSU basketball games.

Over the years, the original building was renovated many times. The 20 foot ceilings were dropped to 8 and 9 foot ceilings to accommodate air conditioning and had multiple uses throughout its history.
