= NCAA boxing championships =

American collegiate boxing tournament

- Sport: College boxing
- Founded: 1932; 94 years ago
- Folded: 1960; 66 years ago
- Country: United States
- Most titles: Wisconsin (8)
- Website: NCAA.com

The NCAA boxing championships were discontinued by the National Collegiate Athletic Association after 1960.

The popularity of college boxing peaked in 1948, when 55 colleges participated in intercollegiate competition. The popularity of college boxing had been waning in the years leading up to 1960, and only 20 teams competed at the 1959 championship. At the 1960 NCAA Championships Charlie Mohr, a boxer on the University of Wisconsin–Madison team, collapsed with a brain hemorrhage and died one week later.

In 1976, American collegiate boxing was picked up again by the National Collegiate Boxing Association. In 2012, the United States Intercollegiate Boxing Association (USIBA) was formed and hosted the first national championships for women alongside a men's division. The first USIBA Championships were hosted at the University of San Francisco in 2013.

== Results ==
The first year of NCAA sponsorship of the championship was 1932. However, national championships were conducted in 1924–31 as well. Before 1948, NCAA team boxing championships were unofficial because team points were not officially awarded.

=== Unofficial team championship (1924–1947) ===
- 1924 Penn State
- 1925 Navy
- 1926 Navy
- 1927 Penn State
- 1928 Navy
- 1929 Penn State
- 1930 Penn State
- 1931 Navy
- 1932 Penn State
- 1936 Syracuse
- 1937 Washington State
- 1938 (co-champions)
  - Catholic University
  - Virginia
  - West Virginia
- 1939 Wisconsin
- 1940 Idaho
- 1941 Idaho
- 1942 Wisconsin
- 1943 Wisconsin
- 1947 Wisconsin

=== Team championship (1948–1960) ===
NCAA boxing championships
Year	Site	Winner	Score	Runner-up	Score
1948; Details	Madison, WI	Wisconsin	45	Michigan State	19
1949; Details	East Lansing, MI	LSU	20	Michigan State	18
1950; Details	State College, PA	Idaho; Gonzaga	18	Michigan State	13
1951; Details	East Lansing, MI	Michigan State	21	Wisconsin	20
1952; Details	Madison, WI	Wisconsin (2)	27	Michigan State	14
1953; Details	Pocatello, ID	Idaho State	25	Wisconsin	19
1954; Details	State College, PA	Wisconsin (3)	19	Maryland	17
1955; Details	Pocatello, ID	Michigan State (2)	17	LSU; San Jose State; Syracuse	13
1956; Details	Madison, WI	Wisconsin (4)	47	Idaho State	20
1957; Details	Pocatello, ID	Idaho State (2)	59	Washington State	12
1958; Details	Sacramento, CA	San Jose State	33	Idaho State	21
1959; Details	Reno, NV	San Jose State (2)	24	Idaho State	22
1960; Details	Madison, WI	San Jose State (3)	43	Wisconsin	34

== Champions ==
=== Team titles ===
Team	Titles	Year(s) won
Wisconsin	8	1939, 1942, 1943, 1947, 1948, 1952, 1954, 1956
Idaho	3	1940, 1941, 1950
San Jose State	3	1958, 1959, 1960
Idaho State	2	1953, 1957
Michigan State	2	1951, 1955
Gonzaga	1	1950
LSU	1	1949
Virginia	1	1938
West Virginia	1	1938
Catholic University	1	1938
Washington State	1	1937
Syracuse	1	1936
Penn State	1	1932

== See also ==
- Pre-NCAA Boxing Champions
- Intercollegiate sports team champions
- Collegiate Nationals
