= Huey P. Long Field House =

Campus of Louisiana University in Baton Rouge

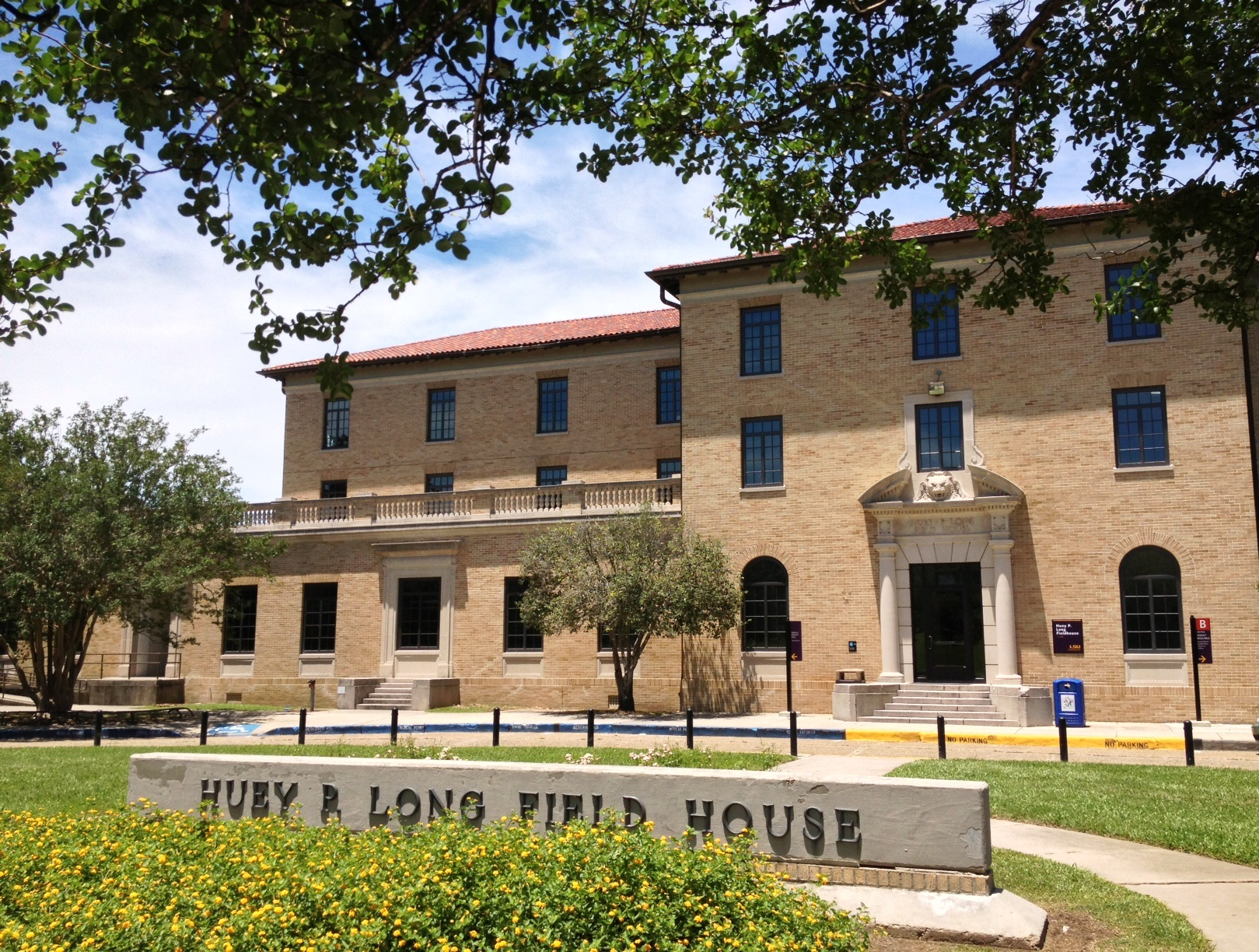
- Huey P. Long Field House on the LSU campus
- Interactive map of the Huey P. Long Field House area

General information
- Architectural style: Italian Renaissance
- Location: Baton Rouge, Louisiana
- Coordinates: 30°24′54″N 91°10′59″W
- Completed: 1932
- Owner: Louisiana State University

Design and construction
- Architect: Weiss, Dreyfous and Seiferth
- Huey P. Long Fieldhouse
- U.S. Historic district – Contributing property
- Part of: Louisiana State University, Baton Rouge (ID88001586)
- Designated CP: September 15, 1988

Huey P. Long Field House, on the campus of Louisiana State University in Baton Rouge, Louisiana, was constructed in 1932. It was named for notable U.S. Senator and state governor Huey Long. The field house is considered the original student union and included a post office, ballroom, gymnasium and also featured the largest swimming pool in the United States at the time.

The field house was home to the LSU Tigers and LSU Lady Tigers swimming and diving teams until the LSU Natatorium was built in 1985. The former LSU varsity hockey team used the field house as their home venue and the former LSU Tigers boxing team also held matches at the field house in addition to Parker Coliseum.

The building is currently the home of LSU's Department of Kinesiology and School of Social Work.

In 2013, plans to renovate the field house were introduced by LSU, State of Louisiana Facility Planning & Control, and Baton Rouge architecture firm Tipton Associates, APAC. In December 2018, LSU contracted Tipton Associates, in a joint-venture with Remson Haley Herpin Architects, to renovate the field house, and construction began in 2020.

== See also ==
- LSU Tigers and Lady Tigers
- LSU Tigers boxing
- LSU Tigers swimming and diving
- LSU Lady Tigers swimming and diving
