= LSU Gym/Armory =

Louisiana State University building

Coordinates: 30.414333°N 91.182672°W

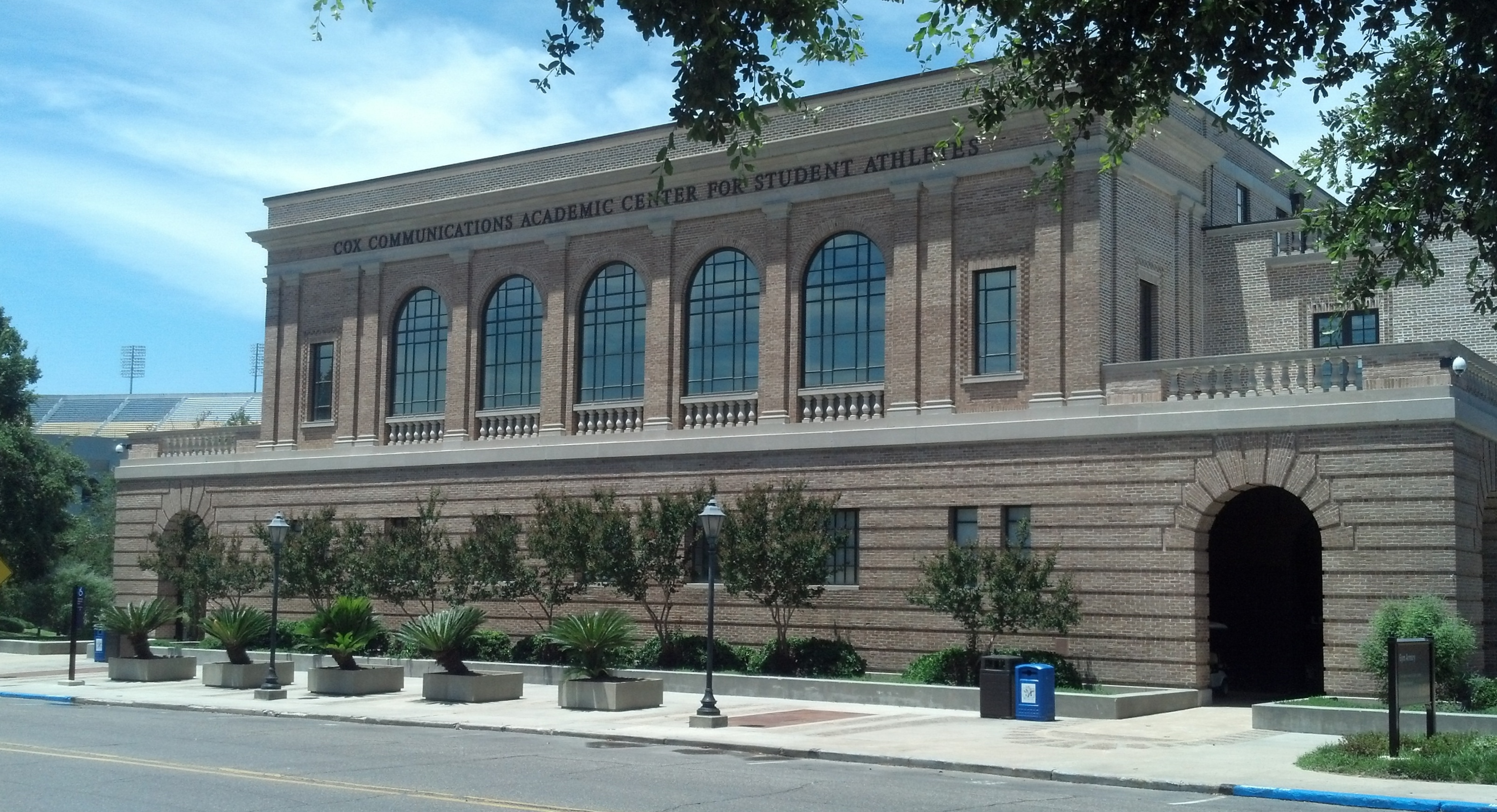
LSU Gym-Armory Building

The LSU Gym Armory building on the campus of Louisiana State University in Baton Rouge, Louisiana was completed in 1930.

== Early history ==
After Huey P. Long became Governor of Louisiana in 1928, he worked with LSU President Thomas Wilson Atkinson to find ways to obtain funding to build new facilities on LSU's campus. A priority was placed on a facility for large student gatherings. Due to budget constraints, President Atkinson proposed a combination Gym/Armory and secured $250,000 from the Louisiana legislature for its construction. It was built on the edge of the bluff. The main floor was the gymnasium and the lower floor was the armory. Both floors were located on ground level. The gymnasium had a stage at one end and could be converted into an auditorium by placing 4,000 folding chairs on the gymnasium floor and another 1,500 in the balcony. When not set up as an auditorium, it provided an open space for basketball games, dances, and other events. The second floor provided space for locker rooms, a trophy room, and a dance studio.

The Gym/Armory was home to the LSU Tigers basketball team after it moved from the old downtown campus. It was replaced by the John M. Parker Agricultural Coliseum in 1937, though for several years both the Gym/Armory and the coliseum were used for LSU basketball games. The facility was also the home of the LSU Tigers wrestling team until moving to the Pete Maravich Assembly Center and has also hosted LHSAA state wrestling tournaments.

Over the years, the original building was renovated many times. The 20 foot ceilings were dropped to 8 and 9 foot ceilings to accommodate air conditioning. The building had multiple uses throughout its history.

== Cox Communications Academic Center for Student-Athletes ==
In 2000, an idea was floated to create an academic center that would house an academic support program that would blend state-of-the-art technology with an appropriate study environment. LSU looked to Richard Manship, longtime Tiger football booster and CEO of Capital City Press and WBRZ-TV, to head the fundraising for the massive project. Manship, along with the Tiger Athletic Foundation, put together the Academic Center Development Council, which was in charge of locating donors. Together with a $5.5 million donation by Cox Communications, more than $14 million was donated by private contributors and supporters of LSU Athletics. In November 2002, the LSU Cox Communications Academic Center for Student-Athletes idea came to fruition.

The goal of the academic center is to offer a comprehensive framework tailored to improve the academic skill set of each student-athlete. The 54,000 square foot Academic Center for Student-Athletes is complete with an entry/atrium, 1,000+-seat Bo Campbell auditorium, computer labs, instructional technology lab, resource library with tech center, study area, tutorial center, meeting rooms, classrooms, student learning center, Shaquille O'Neal life skills labs and offices, Eric Hill communications studio, career center, and Academic Hall of Fame.
