= Tiger Athletic Foundation =

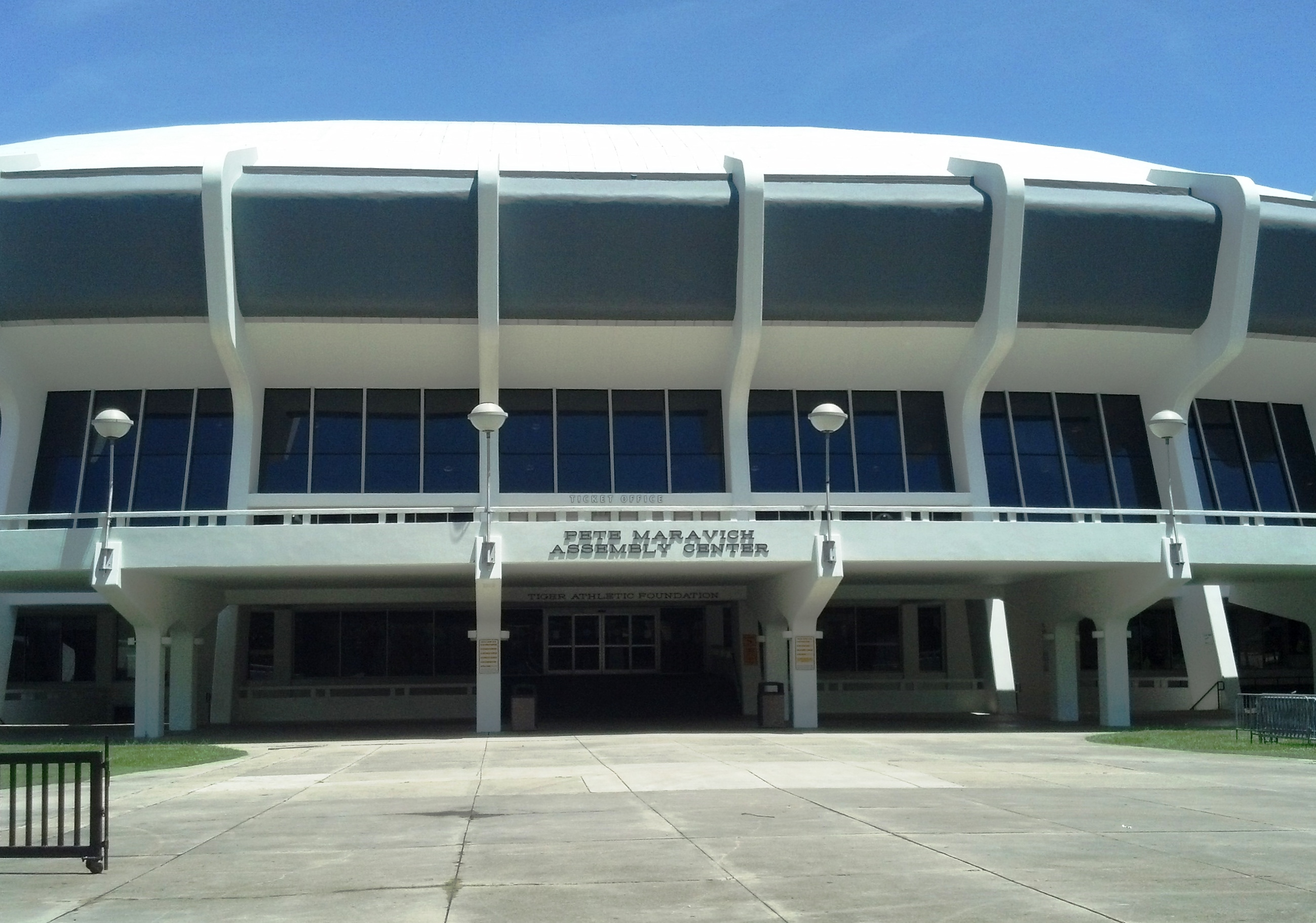
Tiger Athletic Foundation Offices - North Stadium Drive (PMAC)

The Tiger Athletic Foundation (TAF) is a private, non-profit corporation dedicated to supporting Louisiana State University (LSU) and its athletics program. It is the primary source of private funding for LSU athletics and contributions to TAF benefit every athlete and every team at LSU. TAF has become a critical element in the success of LSU Athletics by providing private funding for scholarships, academic rewards, new athletic facilities and facility upgrades. In addition to contributions to the athletic scholarship fund, TAF will continue to provide funding for academic programs and facilities that benefit all LSU students.

== Scholarships ==
In an effort to permanently fund LSU athletic scholarships in each sport, TAF offers the opportunity to support the Foundation of Champions scholarship endowment program. The purpose of this program will be to provide a continuing source of financial support for athletic scholarships through a general scholarship endowment fund. The interest generated from the endowed scholarship will be used to offset the scholarship costs for current student-athletes.

The Tiger Pride Annual Athletic Scholarship Fund provides financial support to fund scholarships for LSU student-athletes through a general scholarship fund. Funds raised help offset the costs for tuition, fees, books, and room and board for LSU student-athletes.

== Tiger Athletic Foundation funded projects ==
- Tiger Athletic Nutrition Center
  Construction of nutrition center providing meals for student-athletes
- LSU Football Operations Center expansion and renovation
  Expansion and renovation of LSU Football Operations Center
- LSU Gymnastics Practice Facility
  Construction of gymnastics practice facility
- LSU Tennis Complex
  New tennis facility
- Tiger Stadium southend expansion
  New upper-deck on south end of Tiger Stadium.
- Tiger Stadium westside plaza
  New plaza on westside of Tiger Stadium.
- Preservation of Tiger Stadium, North end window replacement and North Stadium Drive enhancements
  Project to preserve historic Tiger Stadium, beautify and enhance North Stadium Drive and replace all windows in the north end of Tiger Stadium.
- LSU soccer complex
  New construction to the LSU Soccer Complex.
- Tiger Park
  New softball stadium for the LSU softball team.
- University Club of Baton Rouge practice facility and golf course redesign
  Construction of Mary and Woody Bilyeu LSU Golf practice facility and redesigning The University Club golf course.
- Alex Box Stadium/Skip Bertman Field
  TAF assisted with the building of the New Alex Box Stadium with the help of the Tullis family.
- LSU Basketball Practice Facility
  A new practice facility for the LSU men's and women's basketball teams.
- LSU Football Operations Center
  The facility houses a football atrium, coaches offices, coaches lounge, locker rooms, players lounge, football meeting rooms, training rooms, two weight rooms, equipment room, video production rooms and an indoor practice facility. Four football practice fields are located adjacent to the building.
- Tiger Stadium westside rebuild
  Rebuilt upper-deck that included new seating, new stadium club along with a new press box and coaching boxes.
- Mike the Tiger Habitat
  Built a 15,000 square feet habitat with lush planting, a large Live Oak tree, a waterfall and a stream evolving from a rocky backdrop overflowing with plants and trees.
- Women's Basketball Complex
  New LSU women's basketball complex.
- LSU Cox Communications Academic Center for Student-Athletes
  The Cox Communications Academic Center for Student Athletes currently provides a tutorial staff, a supervised study hall and computer labs available for student-athletes.
- Tiger Stadium eastside expansion
  New upper-deck on eastside of Tiger Stadium.
- Lawton room
  This state-of-the-art meeting room in Tiger Stadium for LSU football program.
- Football locker room
  A renovated football locker room in Tiger Stadium.
- Athletic training center
  23,000 square-foot, multi-level training facility inside Tiger Stadium.
- LSU athletics weight room
  Weight room facility originally designed for all LSU athletic teams.

== Tiger Athletic Foundation special events ==
- The Tiger Tour is a series of speaking engagements by LSU’s coaching staff and other LSU personalities across various cities in the southeastern United States each spring.
- TAF Tailgate Parties are held for all Saturday home football games at the Pete Maravich Assembly Center directly across from Tiger Stadium. TAF tailgate parties are open to all TAF members, LSU Alumni members and their guests.
- TAF Travel is a new joint venture with the LSU Alumni Association to provide travel packages for away football games.
- TheTAF President's Cup golf tournament is held at The University Club golf course.

== TAF member priority points policy ==
The LSU priority point policy is a system developed and used by TAF and the LSU athletics department to allocate select tickets and parking passes based on contributions to LSU and other affiliated organizations (TAF, the LSU Foundation and the LSU Alumni Association). Season ticket assignments and upgrades, parking pass assignments and away, postseason and bowl game ticket assignment are based on this system.

== Governing board ==
The Tiger Athletic Foundation is administered by its own board of directors, composed of TAF donors, which meets quarterly. Officers of the corporation are elected bi-annually.

== LSU fundraising history ==
In 1978 the Varsity Club was formed as a division within the LSU Athletic Department to assist in raising private funds to support the LSU Athletic Program. In 1983 the Varsity Club was replaced by TAF's predecessor, “Tigers Unlimited,” a Louisiana nonprofit corporation. Tigers Unlimited was granted 501(c)(3) status in 1984, and in 1987 Tigers Unlimited reorganized and amended its Articles of Incorporation to formally change its name to Tiger Athletic Foundation. Prominent Baton Rouge businessman, LSU donor and Tiger Athletic Foundation founder Richard Lipsey started the Tiger Athletic Foundation (TAF) in 1987 as a fundraising arm of LSU's athletic department

== See also ==
- LSU Tigers and Lady Tigers
