= LSU Tigers boxing =

JAKE MMB

LSU Tigers
- Founded: 1930
- University: Louisiana State University
- Location: Baton Rouge, Louisiana
- Home stadium: Huey P. Long Field House (1932–1936); John M. Parker Agricultural Coliseum (1937–1956)
- Nickname: Tigers
- Colors: Purple and gold

College World Series champions
- 1949

The LSU Tigers boxing team represented Louisiana State University in NCAA boxing from 1930 to 1956.

== History ==
LSU boxing started as a club sport in 1929 and enjoyed its first varsity season in 1930. The Tigers held matches at the Huey P. Long Field House and starting in 1937 at the John M. Parker Coliseum.

In LSU's first season, they had a record of 5-2 and 6-1 in the ensuring 1931 campaign. In 1934, LSU won its first Southeastern Conference title by beating rival Tulane. Late in the 1930s, LSU won additional SEC titles and finished with a second-place finish in the 1939 NCAA Tournament and a third-place finish in 1940 NCAA Tournament. Some Tiger stalwarts during this period were Heston Daniel, Al Michael, Snyder Parham and Dub Robinson. World War II interrupted the sport, but LSU returned to varsity boxing in 1948.

The 1949 season, LSU's second season after the war, proved to be its best. Paced by individual national champions Wilbert "Pee Wee" Moss and Edsel "Tad" Thrash and coached by Jim Owen, the Tigers went undefeated in regular season play. They finished the year by beating South Carolina in front of 11,000 fans in Parker Coliseum to win its first and only national title. Boxing at LSU continued as a varsity sport during the early 1950s with boxers Calvin Clary, Thurman "Crowe" Peele and Bobby Freeman. Peele won the NCAA heavyweight title in 1955.

Late in the decade, a dwindling number of schools in the region that sponsored boxing as a varsity sport led to higher travel costs for the LSU team. Ultimately, LSU announced in 1956 it would no longer support boxing on the varsity level.

LSU recorded an all-time dual meet record of 101-22-6, one national championship, 31 individual conference champions, 11 individual NCAA champions and 12 NCAA runners-up.

== Championships ==
=== Team national championships ===
Year	Coach	Opponent	Location
1949	Jim Owen	South Carolina Gamecocks	Parker Coliseum
Total team national championships:			1

=== Individual national championships ===
- 11 individual NCAA champions

=== Individual conference championships ===
- 31 individual conference championships

== See also ==
- LSU Tigers and Lady Tigers
- NCAA Boxing Championship
