= Doug Shaffer =

American college diving coach (born 1963)

Current position
- Title: Diving head coach
- Team: LSU
- Conference: Southeastern Conference (SEC)

Biographical details
- Born: July 8, 1963 (age 63); Baltimore, Maryland

Coaching career (HC unless noted)
- 1988–1989: UCLA
- 1989–1996: Minnesota
- 1997–2001: High Performance Center (England)
- 2002–2009: LSU (Asst.)
- 2010–Present: LSU (Dive HC)

Accomplishments and honors

Championships
- 1 SEC Diver of the Year, 2 SEC Champions

Awards
- NCAA Diving Coach of the Year (1993), SEC Women’s Diving Coach of the Year (2008)
Medal record
Men's diving
Representing the United States
Pan American Games
Silver medal – second place	1987 Indianapolis	3m springboard

Doug Shaffer (born July 8, 1963) is an American college diving coach. He is the current co-head coach of the LSU Tigers and LSU Lady Tigers swimming and diving teams at Louisiana State University with responsibilities for the dive team. Dave Geyer is head coach of the swimming team.

== Coaching career ==
Shaffer has been the co-head coach of the LSU Tigers and Lady Tigers swimming and diving teams since 2011 when he was promoted from dive team coach, a position he held from 2002 to 2009, to co-head coach. Under his tutelage, Shaffer has produced 13 NCAA All-Americans, two Southeastern Conference champions and an SEC Diver of the Year.

Prior to LSU, Shaffer was head coach at UCLA from 1988-89 where he coached three Pac-10 champions and four All-Americans during his tenure at UCLA. From 1989-1996, Shaffer was head coach at the University of Minnesota. While at Minnesota, he was named Big Ten Diving Coach of the Year three times - twice on the women's side and once for the men's team. Shaffer coached 11 Big Ten champions, 29 All-Americans and two NCAA champions while at Minnesota. He was named NCAA Diving Coach of the Year in 1993.

He has coached the United States in numerous international competitions since 1989, including the U.S. National Diving teams in China, Sweden, Spain and the United States. Shaffer served as the assistant competition manager during the 1996 Olympic Games in Atlanta and was the head diving coach at the High Performance Center in Sheffield, England. There, he coached five Olympians on the Lottery Funded World Class Performance Program.

== Education ==
Shaffer graduated from the University of California, Los Angeles (UCLA) in 1986. He was an 11-time U.S. National champion, the 1986 NCAA Diver of the Year and the NCAA one-meter and three-meter champion in 1986 for coach Ron Ballatore's UCLA Bruins swimming and diving team. Shaffer was a silver medalist in the three-meter at the 1987 Pan American Games and won a gold medal at the 1987 USA-USSR dual meet in the three-meter competition. An Olympic Trials finalist in 1984 and 1988, he retired from competition in 1988 and moved into the coaching ranks.

== See also ==
- LSU Tigers
- Minnesota Golden Gophers
- UCLA Bruins
