= National Collegiate Boxing Association =

College sports organization

- Abbreviation: NCBA
- Formation: 1976; 50 years ago
- Legal status: Association
- Headquarters: Colorado Springs, Colorado, U.S. (under USA Boxing)
- Region served: United States
- President: Eric Buller
- Main organ: Board of Directors
- Website: ncbaboxing.org

The National Collegiate Boxing Association (NCBA) is a non-profit college sports organization that organizes boxing fights for student athletes. The association falls under the auspices of USA Boxing. After 1960, the NCAA no longer sanctioned boxing. In response, the NCBA was founded in 1976.

NCBA member schools are encouraged to develop their instructional and intramural programs with emphasis on the teaching of fundamental novice boxing skills. In order to be eligible to participate in an NCBA member school, a collegiate boxer must be a full-time student at an accredited institution at which they are attending for graduation.

== Participating schools ==
Participating schools are divided into three regions:

=== East Region ===
- Central Connecticut State University
- Kutztown University of Pennsylvania
- Lock Haven University
- Norwich University
- Pennsylvania State University
- Shippensburg University
- Trinity College
- United States Military Academy (Army)
- University of Hartford
- University of Massachusetts - Amherst
- University of Connecticut
- West Chester University
- University of Delaware

Formerly

- United States Coast Guard Academy (boxing team disbanded in 2018)

=== Midwest Region ===
- Miami University (Ohio)
- North Carolina State University
- Ohio State University
- United States Naval Academy (Navy)
- University of Cincinnati
- University of Dayton
- University of North Carolina at Chapel Hill
- West Virginia University
- University of Iowa

=== West Region ===
- Arizona State University
- Boise State University
- California State University, Sacramento
- Grand Canyon University
- San José State University
- Santa Clara University
- Stanford University
- United States Air Force Academy (Air Force)
- University of California, Berkeley
- University of California, Davis
- University of California, Los Angeles
- University of San Francisco
- University of Southern California
- University of Nevada, Reno
- University of Washington
- University of Utah
- Oregon State University

== Weight classes ==
Weight class limit (lbs/kg)
Men	Women
—	112 lb (50.8 kg)
119 lb (54.0 kg)	119 lb (54.0 kg)
125 lb (56.7 kg)	125 lb (56.7 kg)
132 lb (59.9 kg)	132 lb (59.9 kg)
139 lb (63.0 kg)	139 lb (63.0 kg)
147 lb (66.7 kg)	147 lb (66.7 kg)
156 lb (70.8 kg)	156 lb (70.8 kg)
165 lb (74.8 kg)	165 lb (74.8 kg)
175 lb (79.4 kg)	—
185 lb (83.9 kg)	—
195 lb (88.5 kg)	—
Heavyweight (195+ lbs)	—

== National tournament ==
Contestants for the national tournament are decided by a regional tournament for each NCBA region, with the first- and second-place boxer from each weight class in each region advancing to the national tournament. It is possible for a boxer to advance to nationals by walkover if they have no opponent.

At nationals, the team scoring is conducted as follows:

- Each team automatically receives 1 point.
- Each boxer who wins a quarterfinal match earns 1 point for their team.
- Each boxer who wins a semi-final match earns 3 points for their team.
- Each boxer who wins a final match earns 5 points for their team.

== National team champions ==
Year	Men	Women	Notes
1976	University of Nevada		
1977	West Chester University		
1978	University of Nevada		
1979	West Chester University		
1980	U.S. Air Force Academy		
1981	U.S. Air Force Academy		
1982	West Chester University		
1983	U.S. Air Force Academy		
1984	U.S. Air Force Academy		
1985	U.S. Air Force Academy		
1986	U.S. Air Force Academy		
1987	U.S. Naval Academy		
1988	U.S. Air Force Academy		
1989	U.S. Air Force Academy		
1990	U.S. Air Force Academy		
1991	University of Nevada		
1992	U.S. Air Force Academy		
1993	University of Nevada		
1994	U.S. Air Force Academy		
1995	U.S. Air Force Academy		
1996	U.S. Naval Academy		
1997	U.S. Naval Academy		
1998	U.S. Naval Academy		
1999	U.S. Air Force Academy		
2000	U.S. Air Force Academy		
2001	U.S. Air Force Academy		
2002	U.S. Air Force Academy		
2003	U.S. Air Force Academy		
2004	U.S. Air Force Academy		
2005	U.S. Naval Academy		
2006	University of Nevada-Las Vegas		
2007	Lock Haven University		
2008	U.S. Military Academy		
2009	U.S. Military Academy		
2010	U.S. Military Academy		
2011	U.S. Military Academy		
2012	U.S. Air Force Academy		
2013	U.S. Military Academy		
2014	U.S. Military Academy	Washington	First year to include women's championships
2015	University of Nevada	Washington	
2016	U.S. Military Academy	Washington	
2017	U.S. Military Academy		First tournament sweep by a single school
2018	U.S. Military Academy		
2019	U.S. Military Academy	U.S. Naval Academy	
2020	No tournament held		Cancelled due to the COVID-19 outbreak.
2021	No tournament held		Cancelled due to the COVID-19 outbreak.
2022	U.S. Military Academy	U.S. Naval Academy	
2023	U.S. Air Force Academy	U.S. Military Academy	
2024	U.S. Naval Academy	U.S. Military Academy	
2025	U.S. Naval Academy	U.S. Air Force Academy	
2026	Washington	U.S. Air Force Academy	

National Men's Championships by School
Air Force	20
Army	11
Navy	7
Nevada	5
West Chester	3
Nevada-Las Vegas	1
Lock Haven	1
Washington	1

National Women's Championships by School
Army	4
Washington	3
Air Force	2
Navy	2

== See also ==
- College club sports in the United States
- Collegiate Nationals
- NCAA Boxing Championship
- USA Boxing
