= W. T. "Dub" Robinson Stadium =

Tennis facility in Baton Rouge, Louisiana

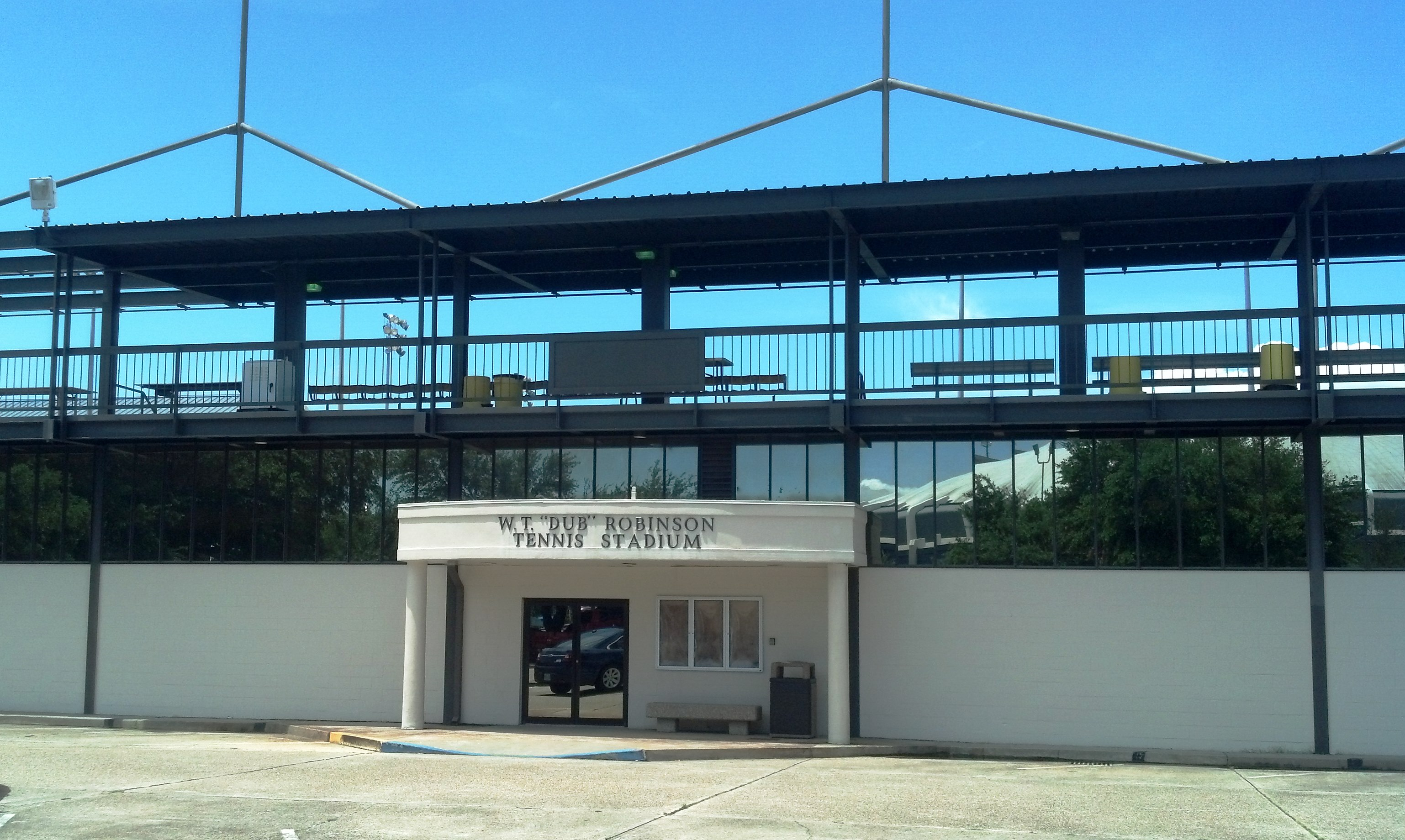
- Interactive map of W. T. "Dub" Robinson Stadium
- Location: Baton Rouge, Louisiana 70803; United States
- Coordinates: 30°24′59″N 91°11′05″W
- Owner: Louisiana State University
- Operator: LSU Athletics Department
- Capacity: 550

Construction
- Opened: 1976
- Closed: 2014

Tenants
- LSU Tigers and Lady Tigers (Tennis) (NCAA)

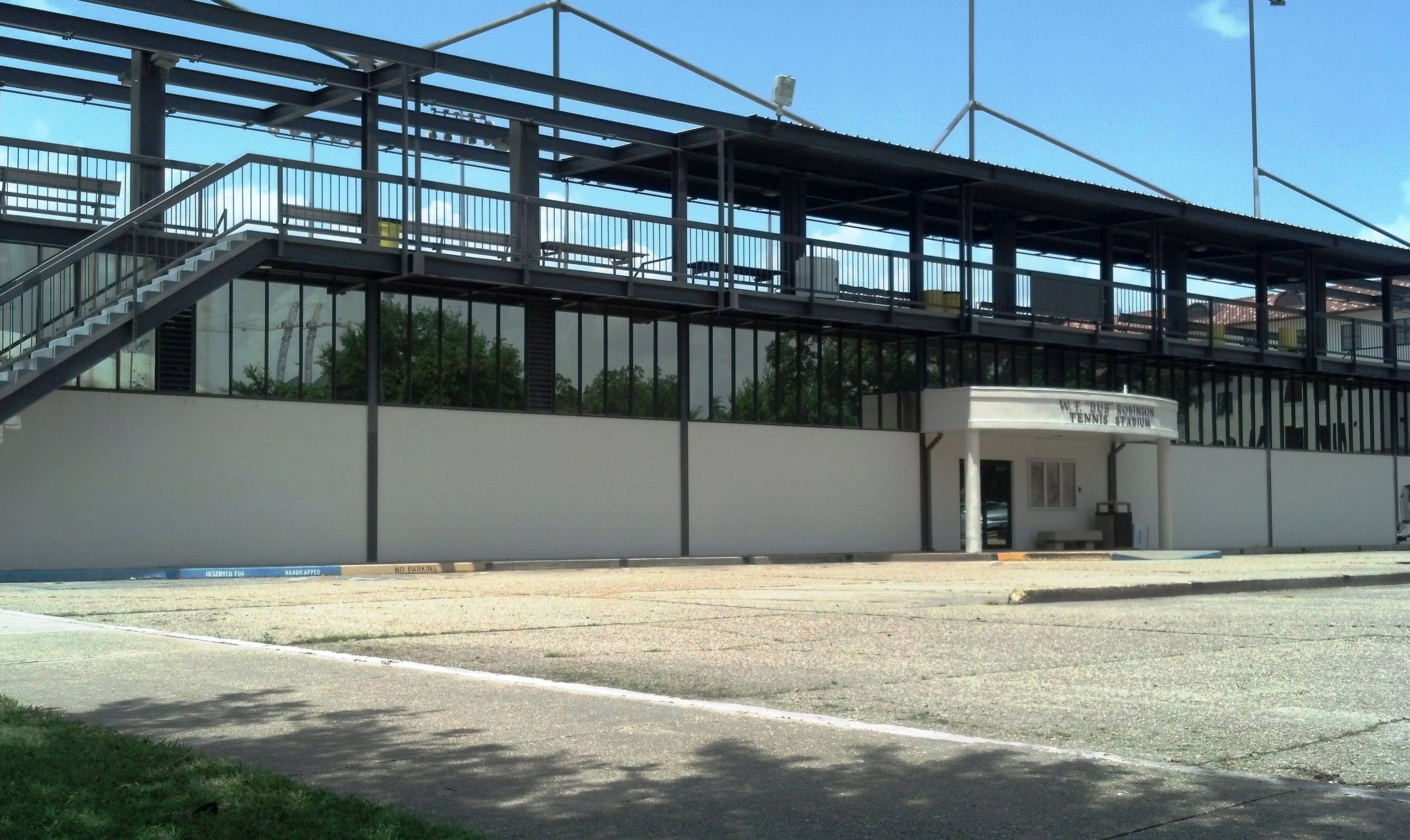
W. T. "Dub" Robinson Stadium

W. T. "Dub" Robinson Stadium was a tennis facility located on the campus of Louisiana State University in Baton Rouge, LA. The facility, built in 1976, served as the home of the LSU Tigers and LSU Lady Tigers tennis teams from 1976 to 2014. The stadium had a seating capacity of 550. It was named in honor of former standout head coach W.T. "Dub" Robinson, a coach that elevated the LSU tennis program to national prominence.

The facility provided six varsity tennis courts with an individual scoreboard on every court plus an additional six practice courts. The stadium also offered the Tigers and Lady Tigers state-of-the-art locker rooms, a meeting room, players lounge, media room and equipment room.

W.T. "Dub" Robinson Stadium was the site for both the 2007 SEC Tennis Championships and NCAA Regionals and was also home of the 2009 NCAA Regionals.

In 2015, the facility was replaced by the LSU Tennis Complex as the home venue for the tennis teams. The stadium was demolished in 2018 and the LSU Tigers women's beach volleyball stadium was built on the site.

== See also ==
- LSU Tigers and Lady Tigers
- LSU Tennis Complex
