= LSU Tigers swimming and diving =

- Founded: 1936 (87 years ago)
- Head coach: Dave Geyer and Doug Shaffer
- Conference: Southeastern Conference
- Location: Baton Rouge, Louisiana, US
- Home pool: LSU Natatorium
- Colors: Purple and gold

Men's Conference Champions
- 1 (1988)

The LSU Tigers swimming and diving team represents Louisiana State University (LSU) in the Southeastern Conference in NCAA men's swimming and diving. The team competes at the LSU Natatorium in Baton Rouge, Louisiana. Dave Geyer is the co-head coach of the men's swim team. Doug Shaffer is the co-head coach of the men's diving teams.

== History ==
The LSU men's swimming and diving team first competed in 1936, finishing third at the Southeastern Conference championship. There were no teams from 1940 to 1967, but in 1968 the men's swimming and diving team was reinstated.

== Championships ==
SEC Championships: 1988

== Olympic & notable swimmers and divers ==
- Mark Andrews
- Jarrod Marrs
- Todd Torres

== Tigers head coaches ==
Name	Seasons
Unknown	1936–1939
No team	1940–1967
Layne Jorgensen	1968–1970
Ivan Harless	1971–1972
Edward Stickles	1973–1980
Ivan Harless	1981–1982
Scott Woodburn	1983–1985
Sam Freas	1986–1988
Rick Meador	1989–2000
Jeff Cavana	2001–2004
Adam Schmitt	2005–2010
Dave Geyer and Doug Shaffer	2011–present

=== Other notable coaches ===
- Lars Jorgensen (born 1970), Olympic swimmer and college coach

== Swimming and Diving facilities ==
=== LSU Natatorium ===
The LSU Natatorium is a swimming & diving facility located on the campus of Louisiana State University in Baton Rouge, LA. The facility, built in 1985, serves as the home of the LSU Tigers swimming and diving team. The stadium has a seating capacity of 2,200. The Natatorium features a 50-meter pool, which can be converted into two 25-meter or 25-yard pools with the use of bulkheads and includes a championship diving well with one- and three-meter springboards and five-, seven- and 10-meter platforms.

=== Huey P. Long Field House ===
The Huey P. Long Field House was home to the LSU Tigers swimming and diving team until the LSU Natatorium was built in 1985.

== Strength and Conditioning facilities ==
=== LSU Strength and Conditioning facility ===
The LSU Tigers basketball strength training and conditioning facility is located in the LSU Strength and Conditioning facility. Built in 1997, it is located adjacent to Tiger Stadium. Measuring 10,000-square feet with a flat surface, it has 28 multi-purpose power stations, 36 assorted selectorized machines and 10 dumbbell stations along with a plyometric specific area, medicine balls, hurdles, plyometric boxes and assorted speed and agility equipment. It also features 2 treadmills, 4 stationary bikes, 2 elliptical cross trainers, a stepper and stepmill.

== See also ==
- List of college swimming and diving teams
