= Charlie Mohr =

American boxer

Charlie Mohr (died April 17, 1960) was a middleweight college boxer for the University of Wisconsin–Madison. Mohr, from New York City, died of a brain hemorrhage following an NCAA Tournament bout eight days earlier with Stu Bartell of San Jose State University. Twenty-two days after Mohr's death, the University of Wisconsin–Madison abolished the sport at UW–Madison. The NCAA soon followed Wisconsin's lead, officially ending their support of the national boxing tournament in late 1960 and unofficially terminating the sport.
