= Dub Robinson =

American tennis coach

Biographical details
- Born: October 6, 1912
- Died: December 14, 1987 (aged 75)
- Education: Louisiana State University

Coaching career (HC unless noted)
- 1948–1974, 1979: LSU

Head coaching record
- Overall: 189–180–9 (.512)

W. T. "Dub" Robinson (October 6, 1912 – December 14, 1987) was the head men's tennis coach at Louisiana State University.

== Coaching career ==
Robinson succeeded Mike Donahue at LSU and had a record of 173–173–9 from 1948 to 1974. He returned to coach the Tigers for one season in 1979, replacing his first successor, Steve Carter. The Tigers finished 16–7 in 1979, leaving Robinson with an overall record of 189–180–9 in 28 seasons as head coach. His teams finished as SEC runner-up four times. He was succeeded by Steve Strome in 1980. LSU named its tennis stadium, W.T. "Dub" Robinson Stadium (1976–2014), after Dub Robinson.

== Personal life ==
Dub's youngest son, Johnny Robinson, is a former American football all-star safety who graduated from Louisiana State University and later played for the American Football League's Dallas Texans-Kansas City Chiefs.
