= Diving at the 1987 Pan American Games =

Diving Competition at the 1987 Pan American Gameswas held from August 7 to August 23, 1987, in Indianapolis, United States. There were two events each for men and women. Events were held at the Indiana University Natatorium.

== Medal table ==
Place	Nation	Gold medal	Silver medal	Bronze medal	Total
1	United States	4	3	0	7
2	Canada	0	1	2	3
3	Argentina	0	0	1	1
	Mexico	0	0	1	1
Total		4	4	4	12

== Medalists ==
=== Men ===
Event	Gold	Silver	Bronze
3m springboard	Greg Louganis; United States	Doug Shaffer; United States	José Rocha; Mexico
10m platform	Greg Louganis; United States	Matt Scoggin; United States	David Bedard; Canada

=== Women ===
Event	Gold	Silver	Bronze
3m springboard	Kelly McCormick; United States	Megan Meyer; United States	Debbie Fuller; Canada
10m platform	Michele Mitchell; United States	Wendy Fuller; Canada	Verónica G. Ribot de Cañales; Argentina

== See also ==
- Diving at the 1988 Summer Olympics
