= Wendy Fuller =

Canadian diver (born 1965)

Personal information
- Full name: Wendy Marie Fuller
- Born: January 8, 1965 (age 61) Montreal, Quebec, Canada
Medal record
Women's diving
Representing Canada
Pan American Games
Silver medal – second place	1987 Indianapolis	10m platform

Wendy Marie Fuller (born January 8, 1965) is a Canadian retired diver, who represented her native country at the 1988 Summer Olympics, finishing in 13th place in the Women's 10m Platform. In the same event she won a silver medal at the 1987 Pan American Games in Indianapolis, United States. Her younger sister Debbie also competed as an international diver.
