= LSU Tennis Complex =

Tennis stadium in Baton Rouge, Louisiana

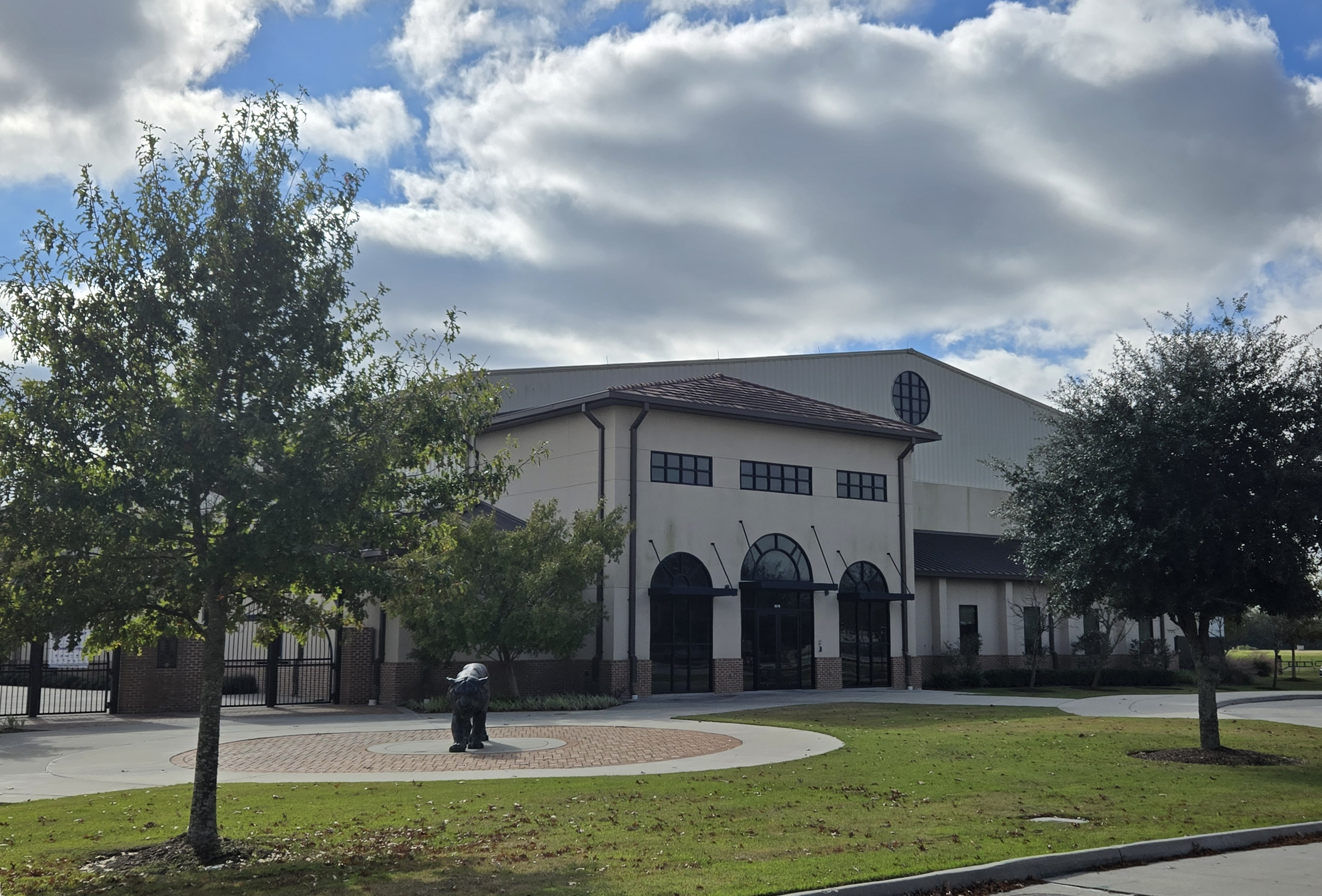
- Interactive map of LSU Tennis Complex
- Location: Baton Rouge, Louisiana 70803; United States
- Coordinates: 30.404407°N 91.189574°W
- Owner: Louisiana State University
- Operator: LSU Athletics Department
- Capacity: 1,400

Construction
- Groundbreaking: 2014
- Opened: 2015
- Cost: 9.7 million
- Architect: Holden Architects

Tenants
- LSU Tigers and Lady Tigers (Tennis) (NCAA)

The LSU Tennis Complex is a tennis facility located on the campus of Louisiana State University in Baton Rouge, LA. The facility, built in 2015, serves as the home of the LSU Tigers and LSU Lady Tigers tennis teams. It has a seating capacity of 1,400.

The facility provides six indoor tennis courts with a second floor grandstand that seats 300 covering 75,000 square feet. The complex also includes 12 lighted outdoor courts with a grandstand. The complex also offers the Tigers and Lady Tigers state-of-the-art locker rooms, a meeting room, players lounge, equipment room, coaches' offices, strength and conditioning center, satellite athletic training room and media room.

The LSU Tennis Complex hosted the 2016 SEC Women's tennis tournament.

== Gallery ==
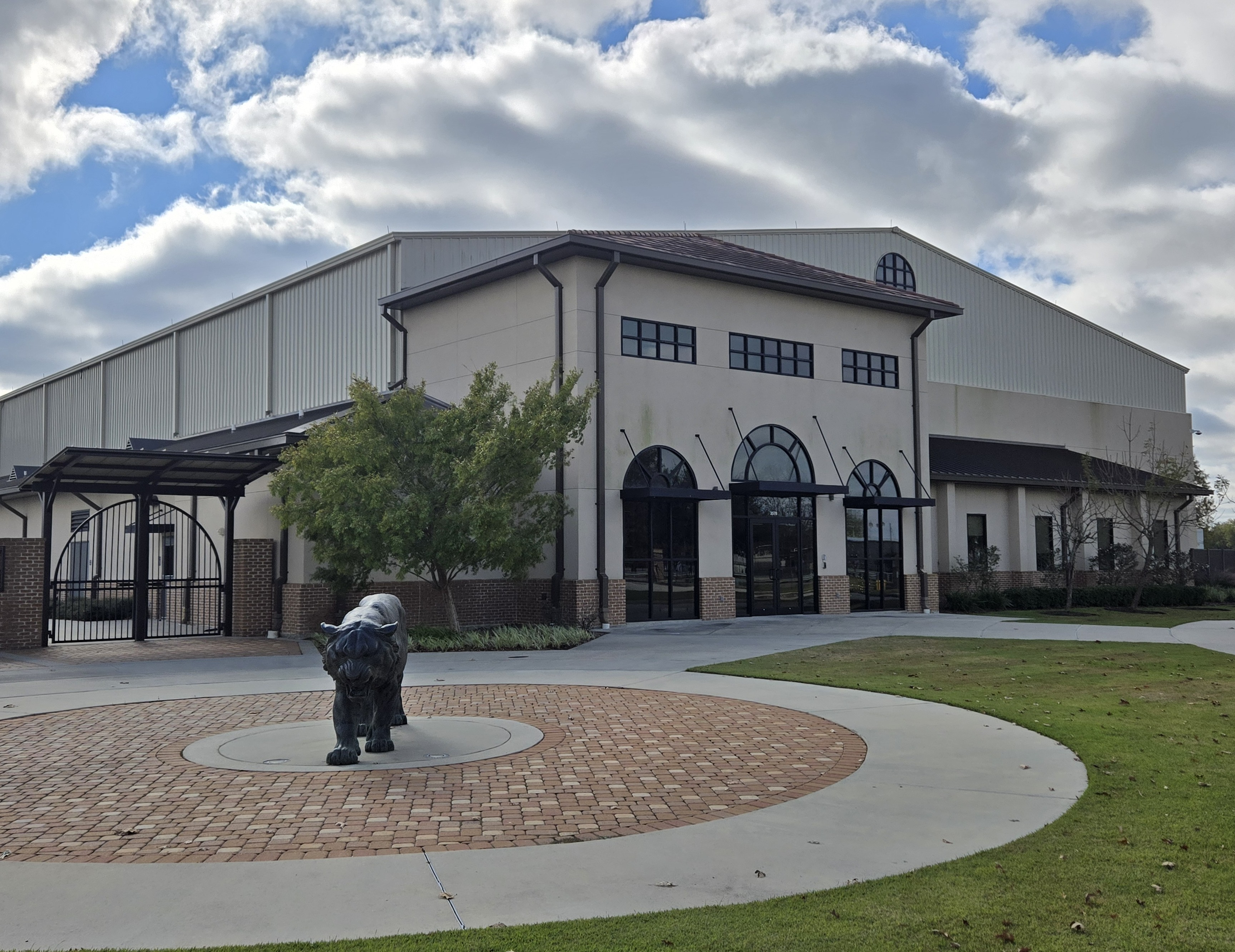
LSU Tennis Complex Indoor Facility

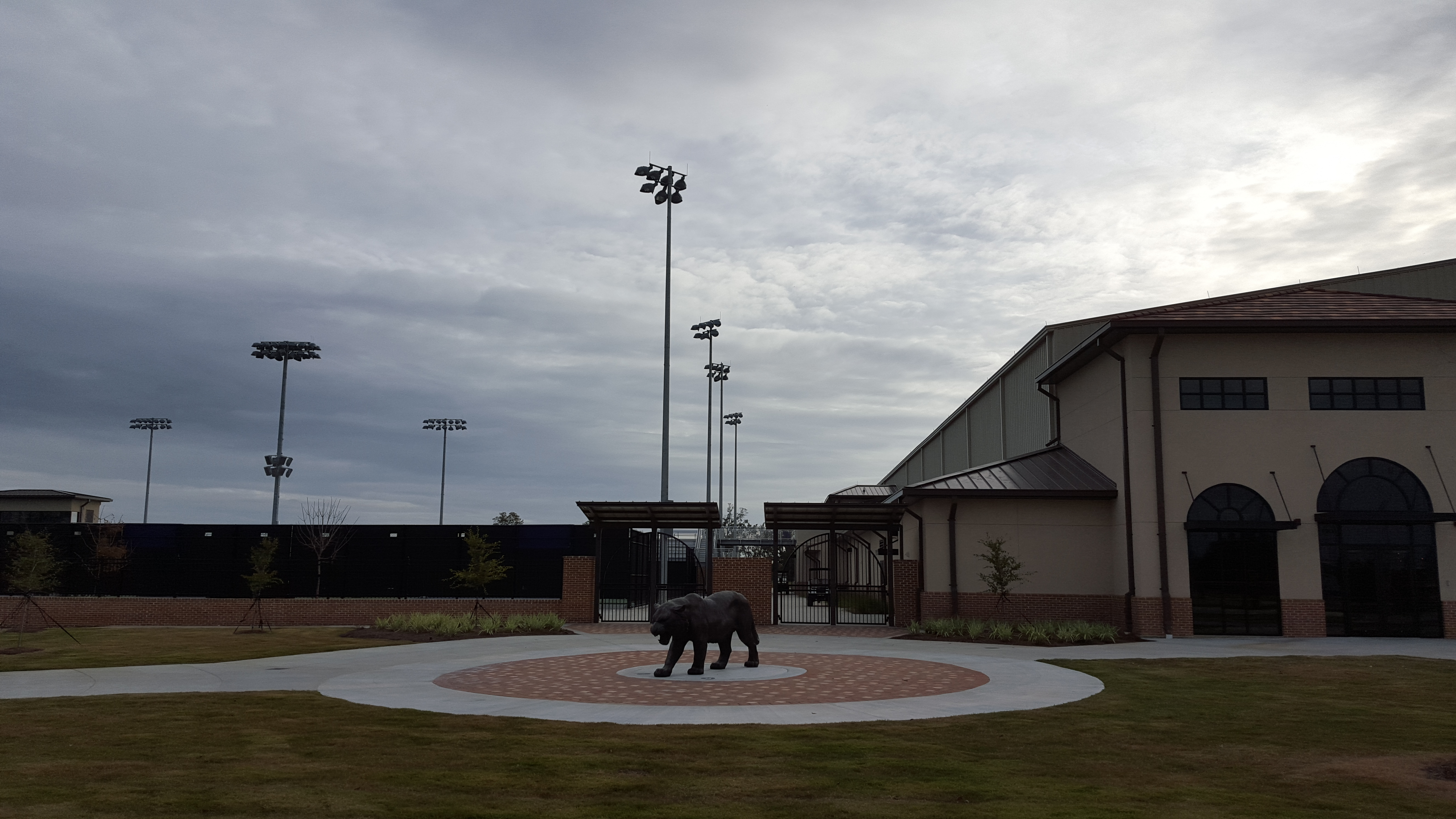
LSU Tennis Complex Tiger Statue

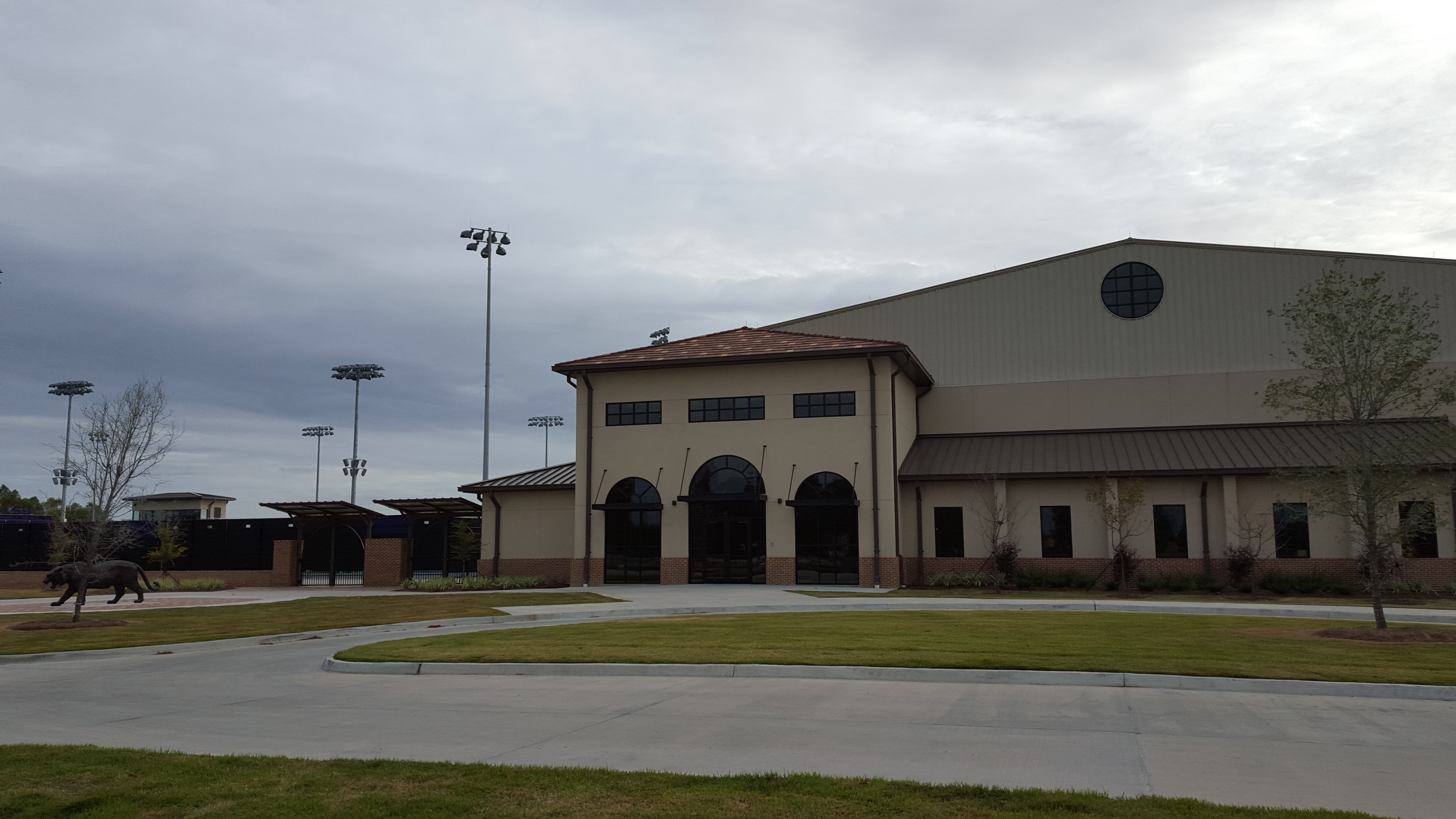
LSU Tennis Complex Building

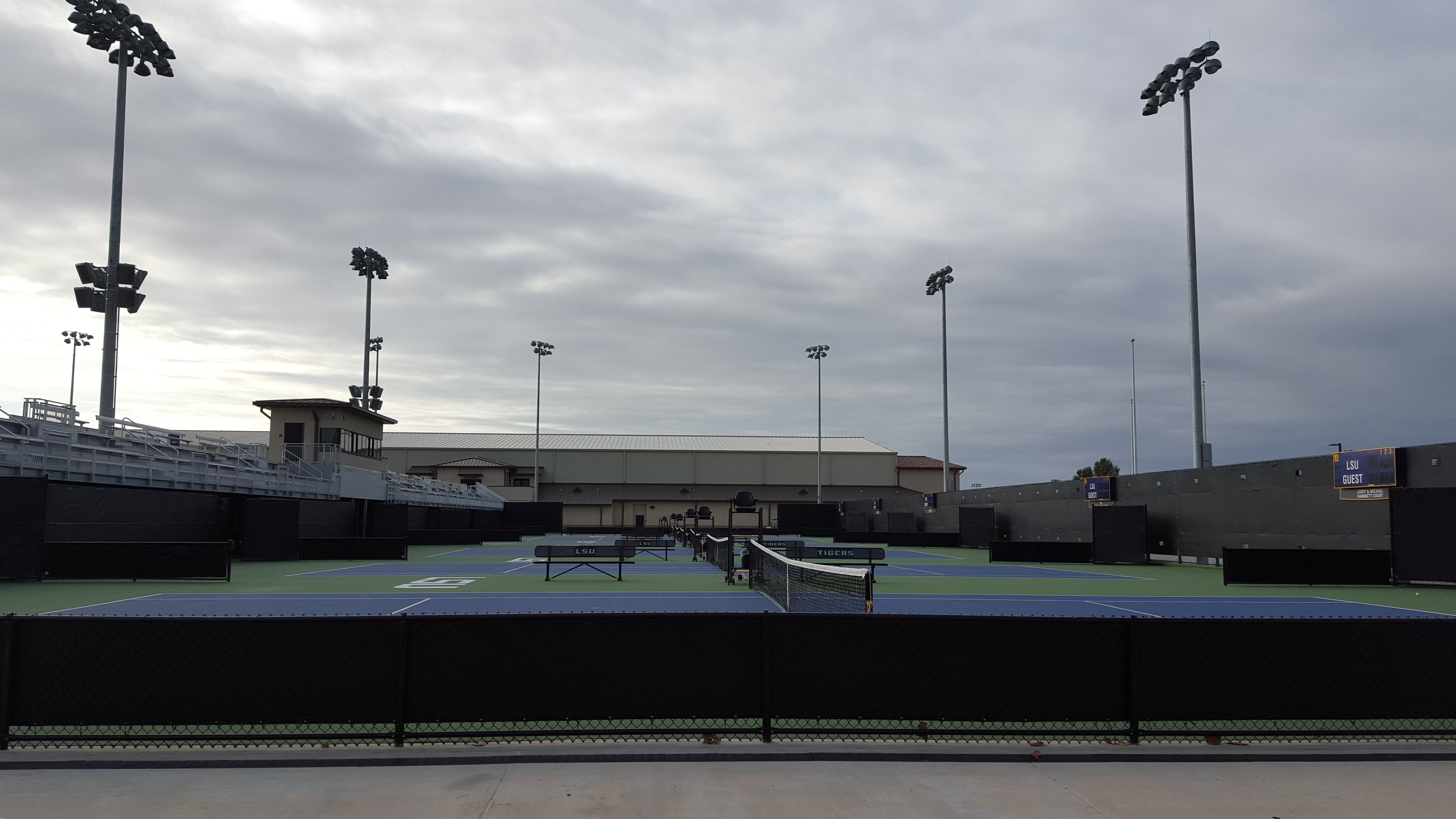
LSU Tennis Complex Front Courts

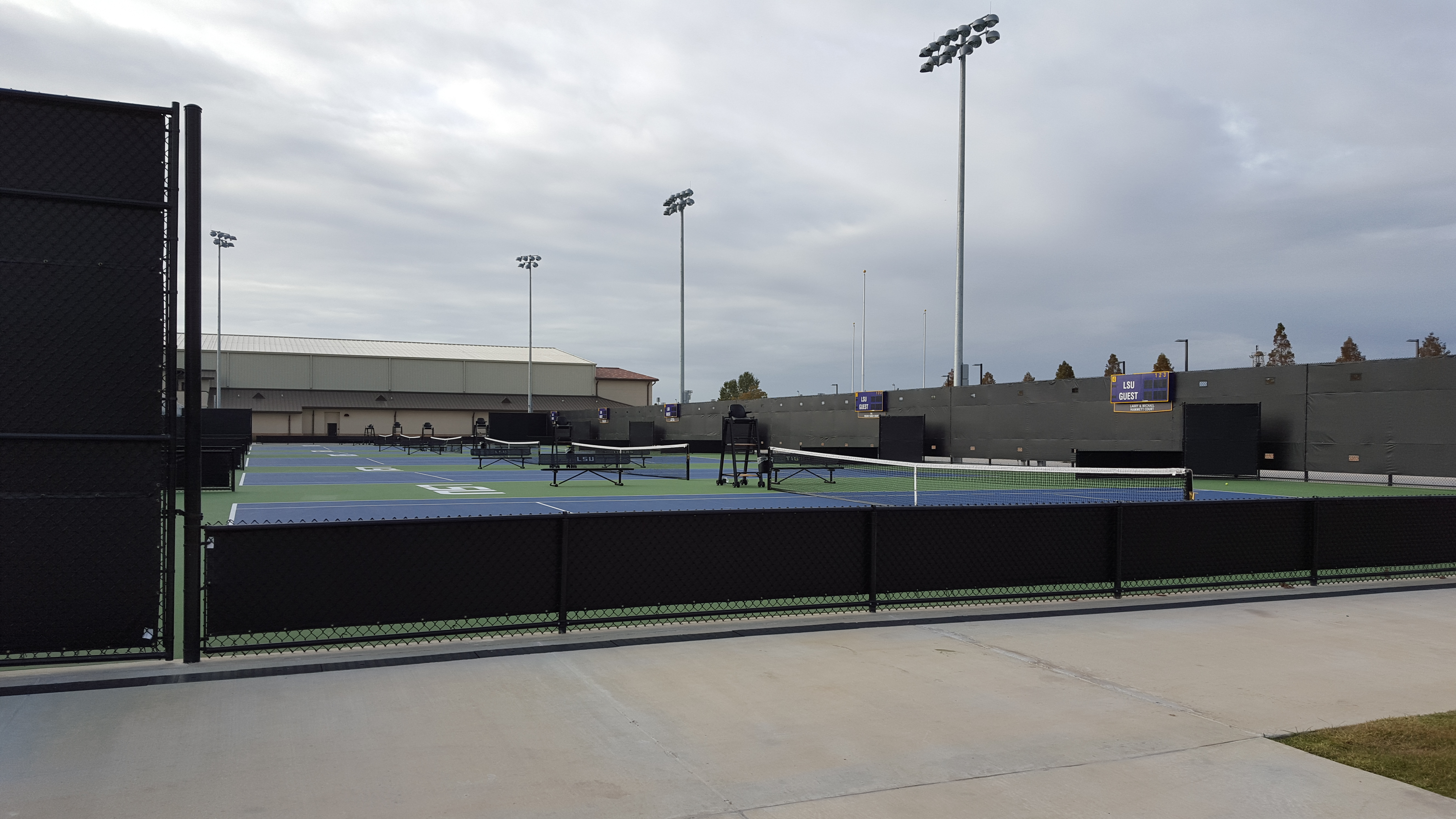
LSU Tennis Complex Front Courts-Scoreboards

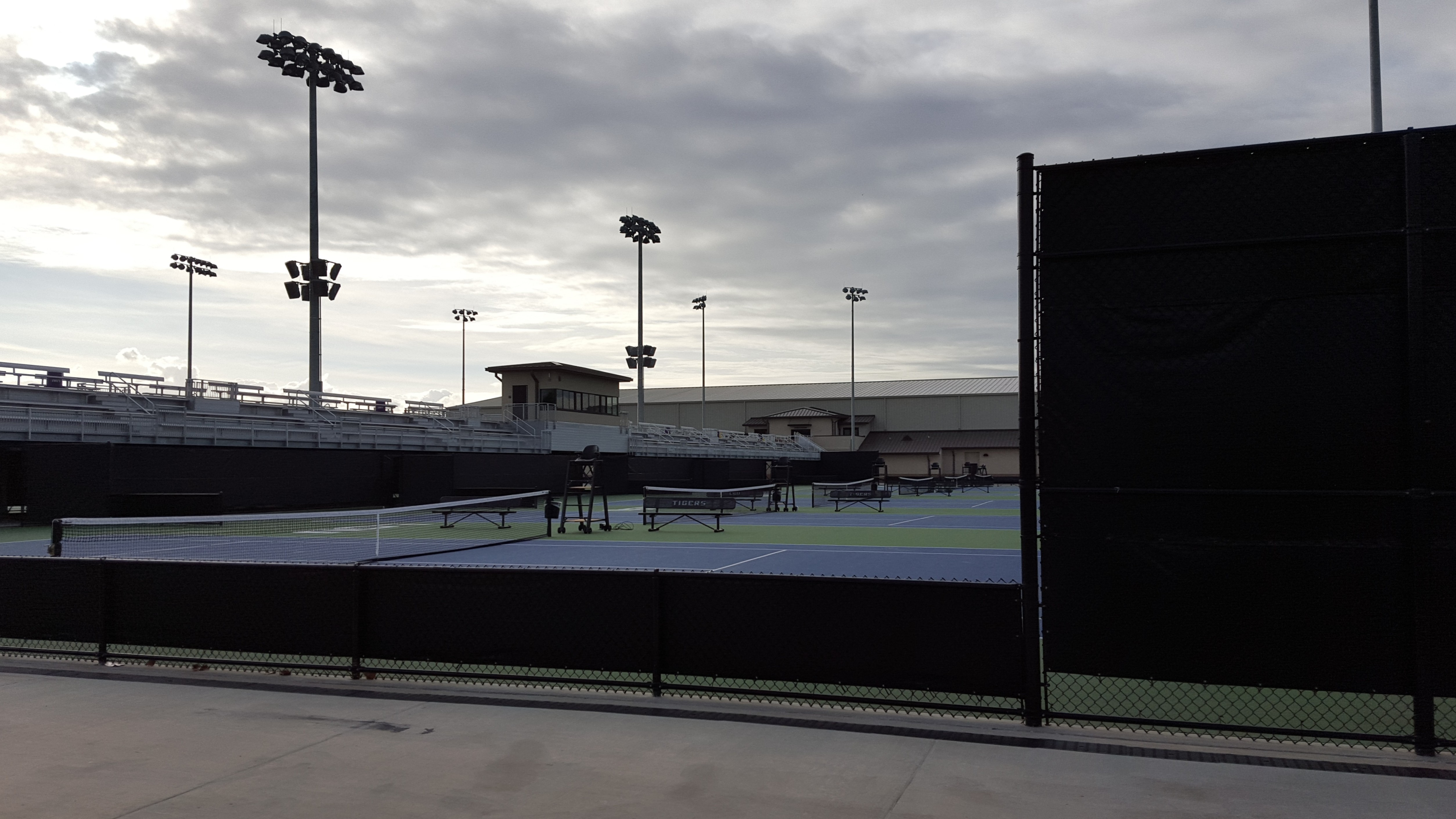
LSU Tennis Complex Press Box

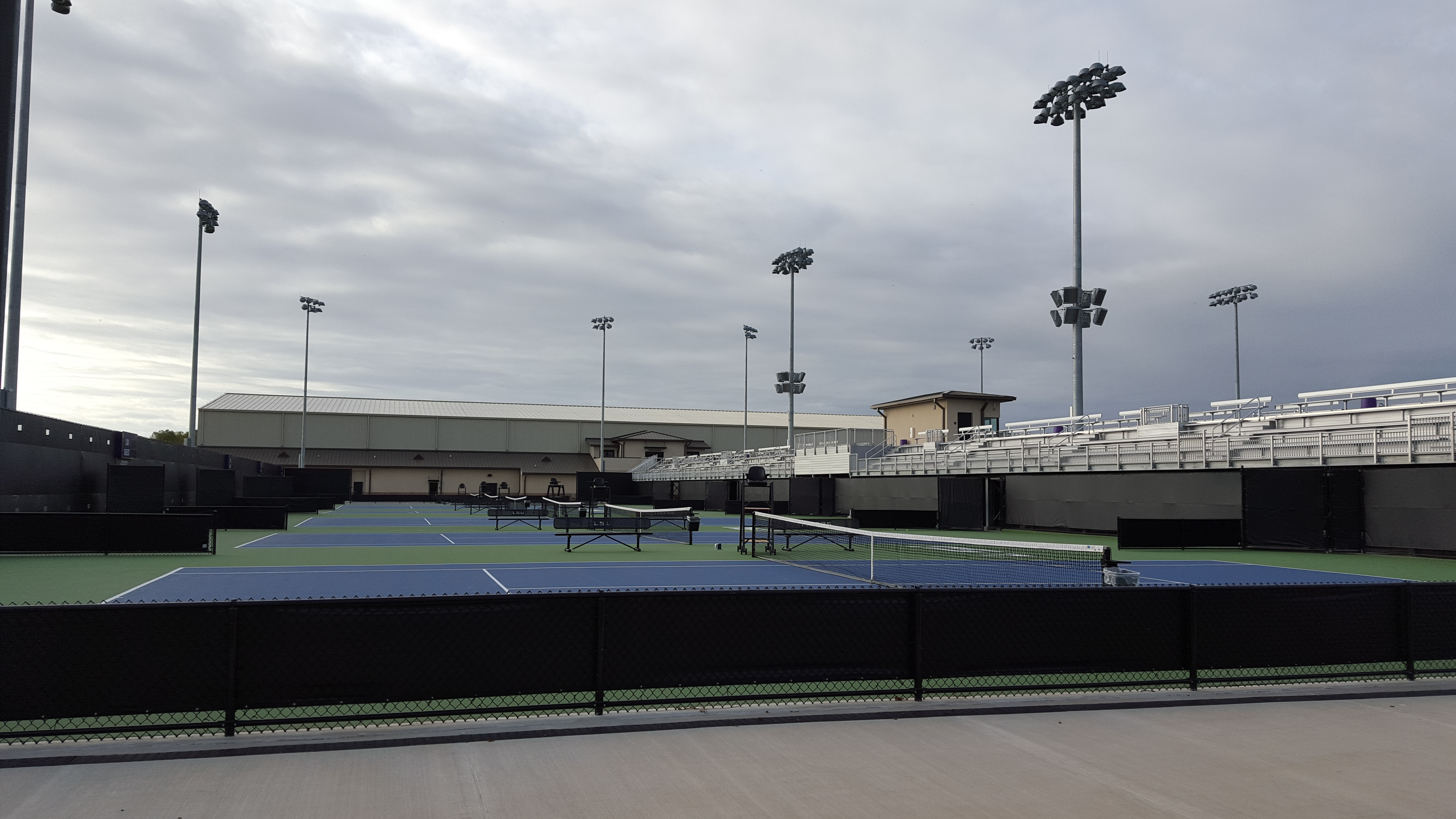
LSU Tennis Complex Back Courts

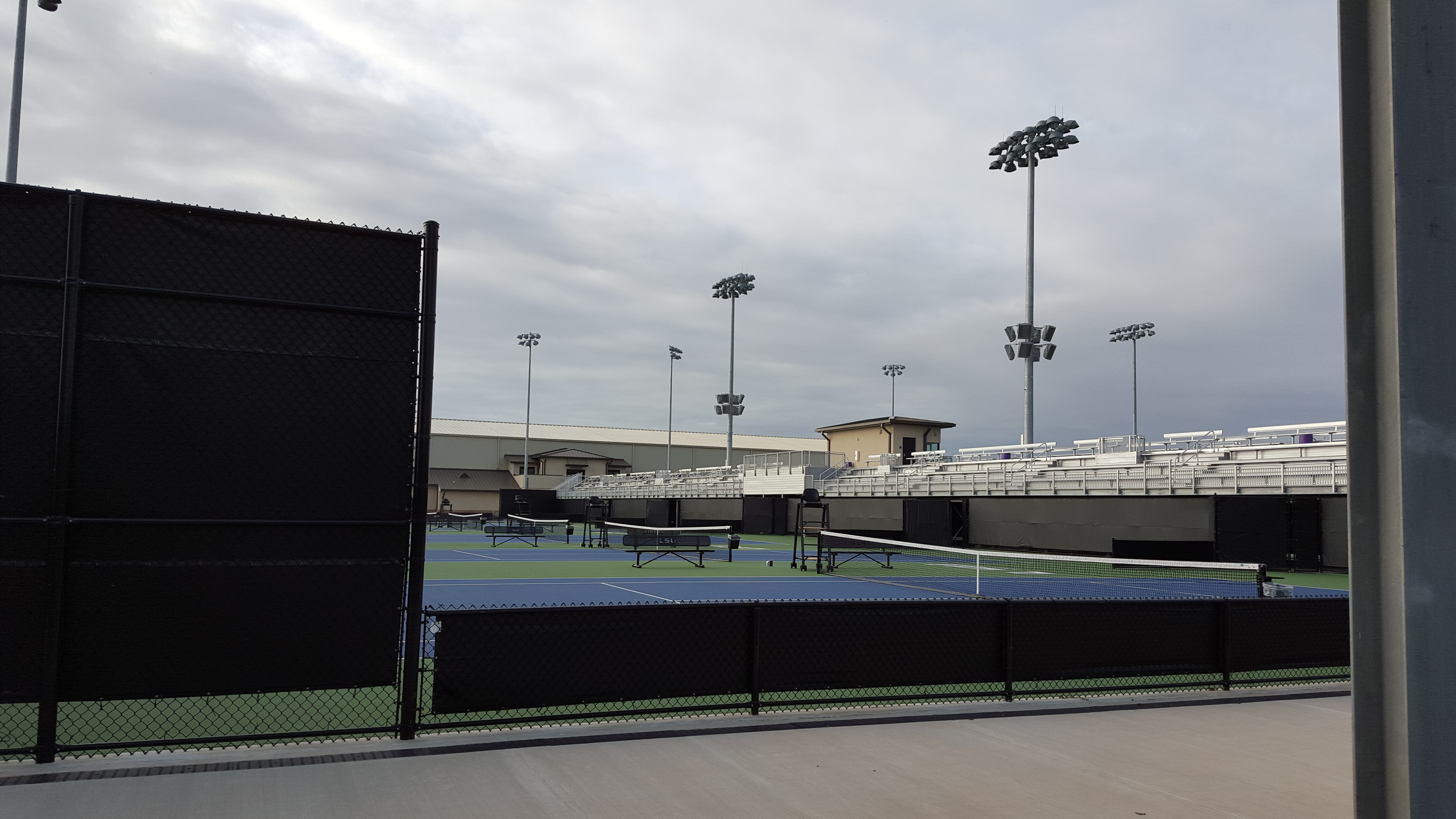
LSU Tennis Complex Back Courts-Stands

== See also ==
- LSU Tigers and Lady Tigers
- W.T. "Dub" Robinson Stadium
