= LSU Natatorium =

Aquatics facility in Baton Rouge, Louisiana

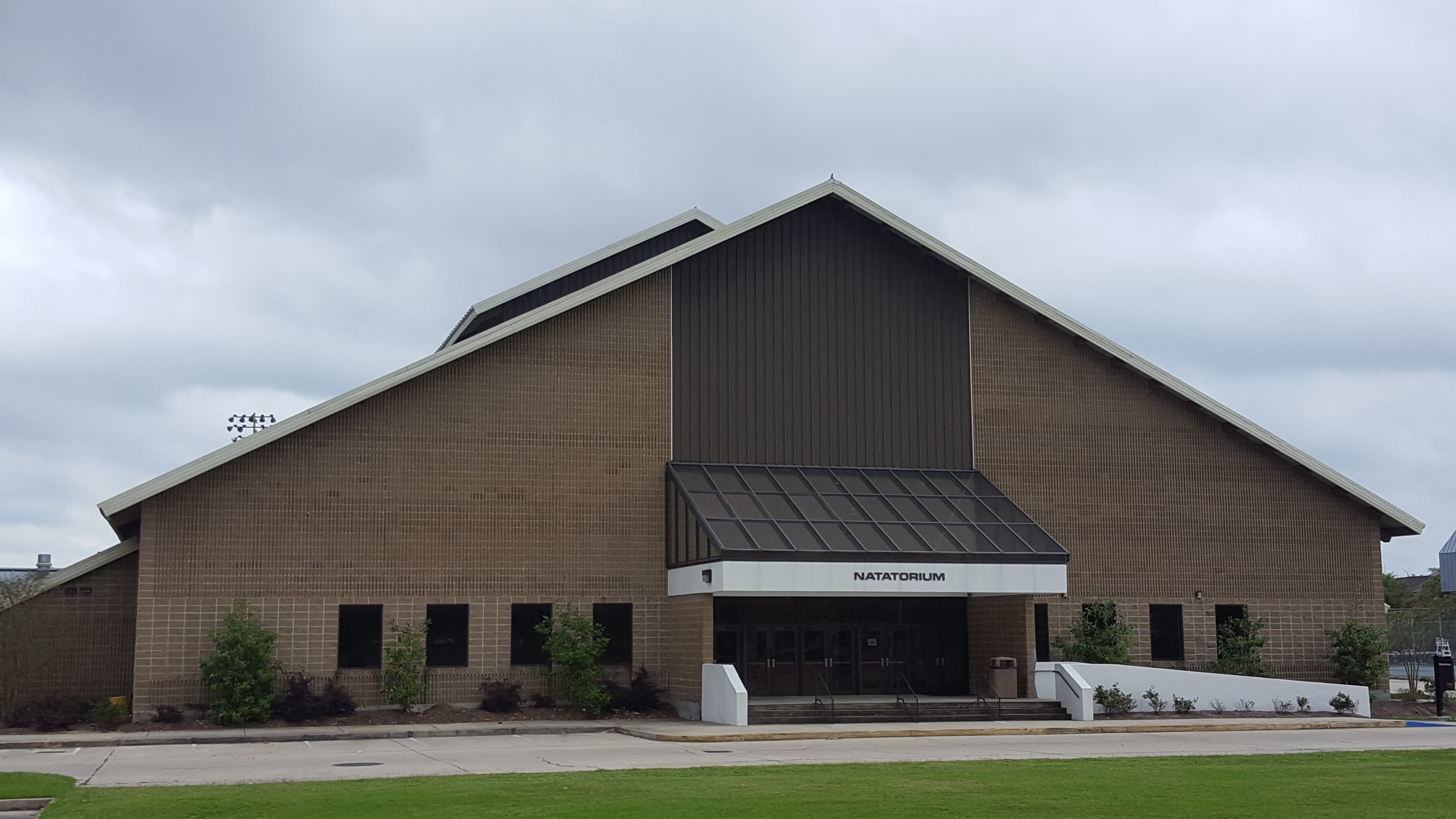
- Interactive map of LSU Natatorium
- Location: Nicholson Drive; Baton Rouge, Louisiana 70803; United States
- Coordinates: 30.41723°N 91.1856°W
- Owner: Louisiana State University
- Operator: LSU Athletics Department
- Capacity: 2,200

Construction
- Opened: 1985

Tenants
- LSU Tigers swimming and diving (NCAA); LSU Lady Tigers swimming and diving (NCAA)

The LSU Natatorium is a swimming and diving facility located on the campus of Louisiana State University in Baton Rouge, LA. The facility, built in 1985, serves as the home of the LSU Tigers and LSU Lady Tigers swimming and diving teams. The stadium has a seating capacity of 2,200. The Natatorium features a 50-meter pool, which can be converted into two 25-meter or 25-yard pools with the use of bulkheads and includes a championship diving well with one- and three-meter springboards and five-, seven- and 10-meter platforms.

The facility has played host to several national competitions, including the 1985 National Sports Festival, the 1986 Men's Southeastern Conference Championships, the 1987 NCAA Diving Regional and the U.S. Diving National Championships and the 1999 NCAA Regional Diving Championships.

== Gallery ==
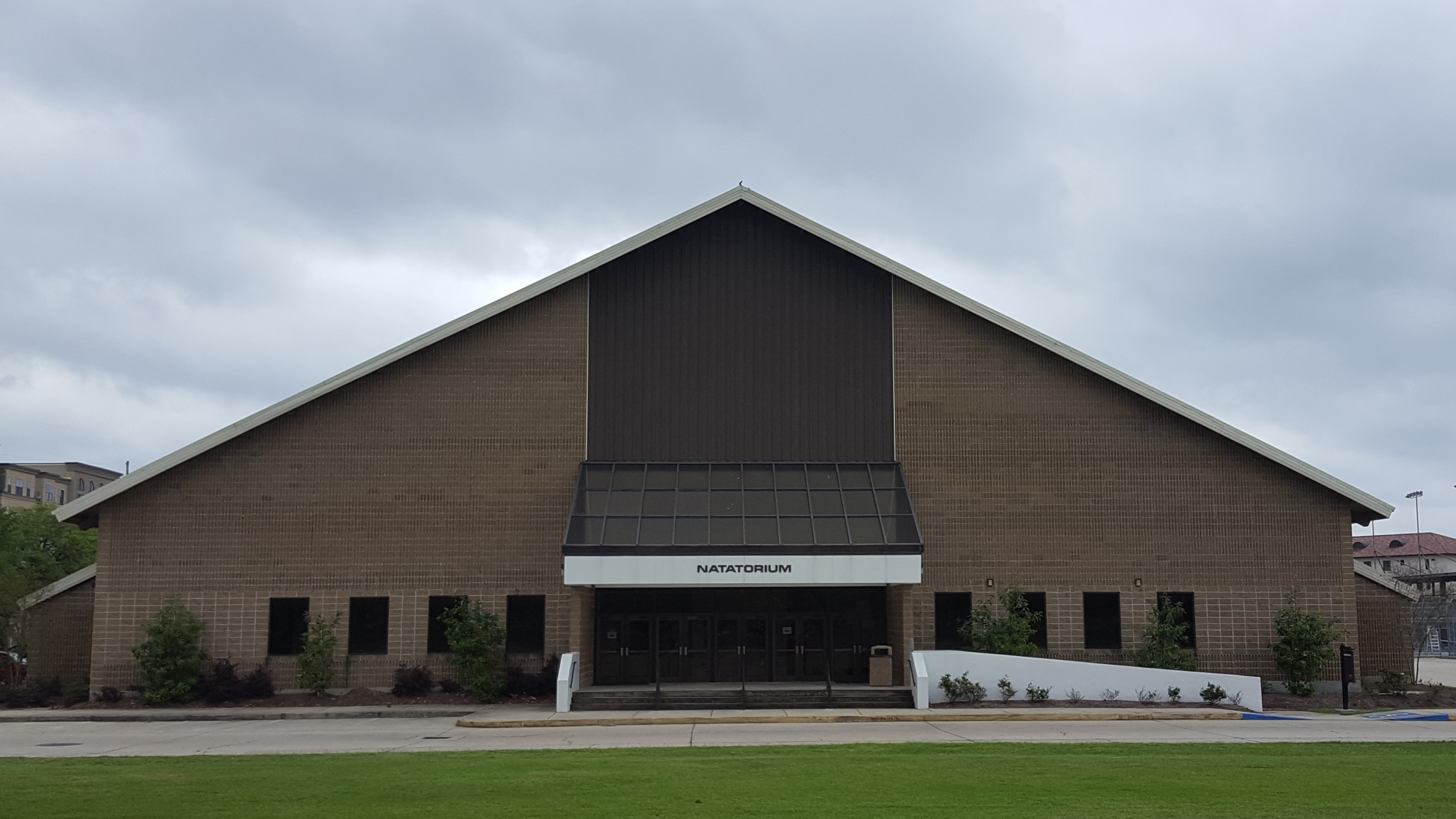
LSU Natatorium - Front View

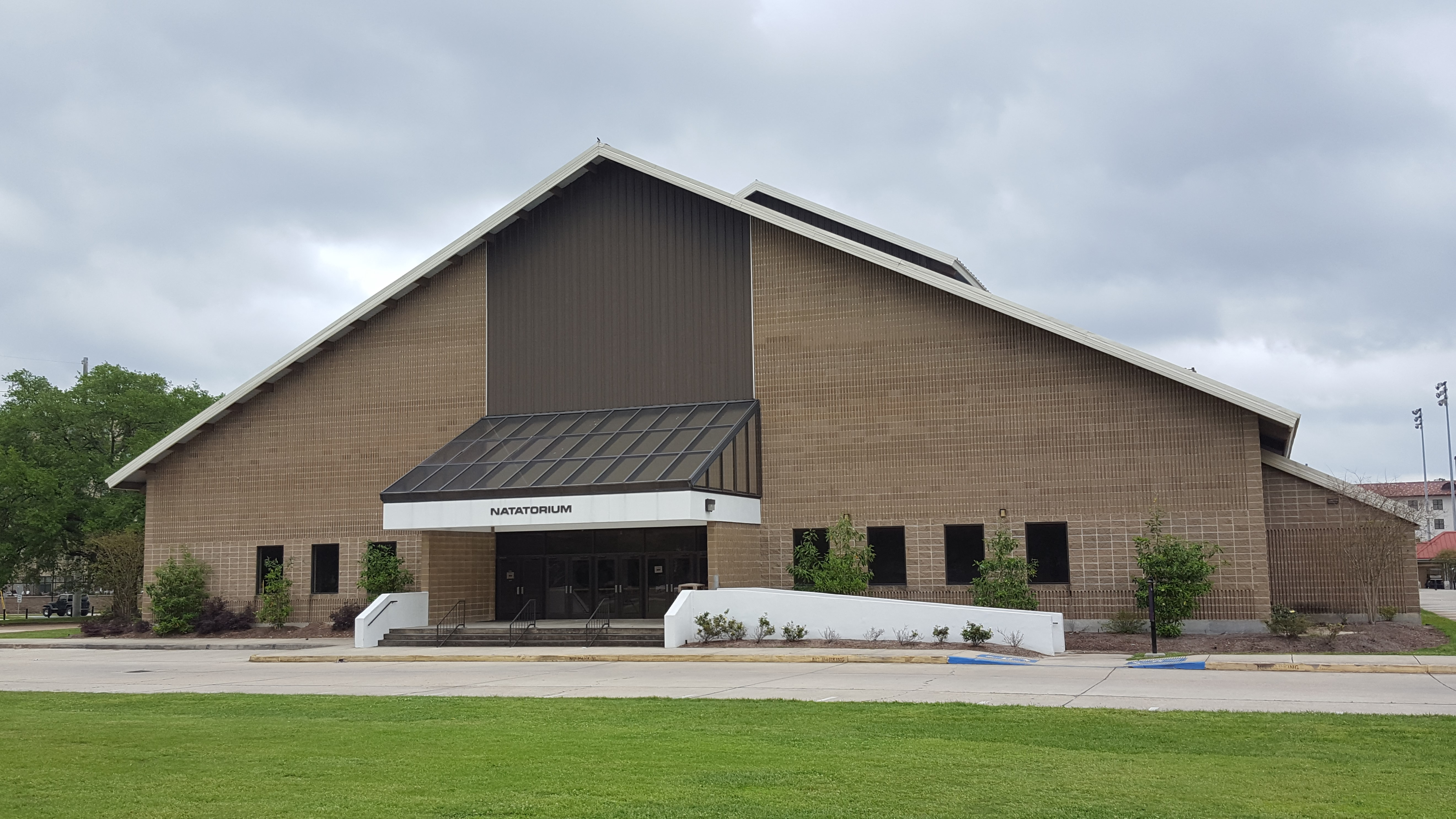
LSU Natatorium - Side View

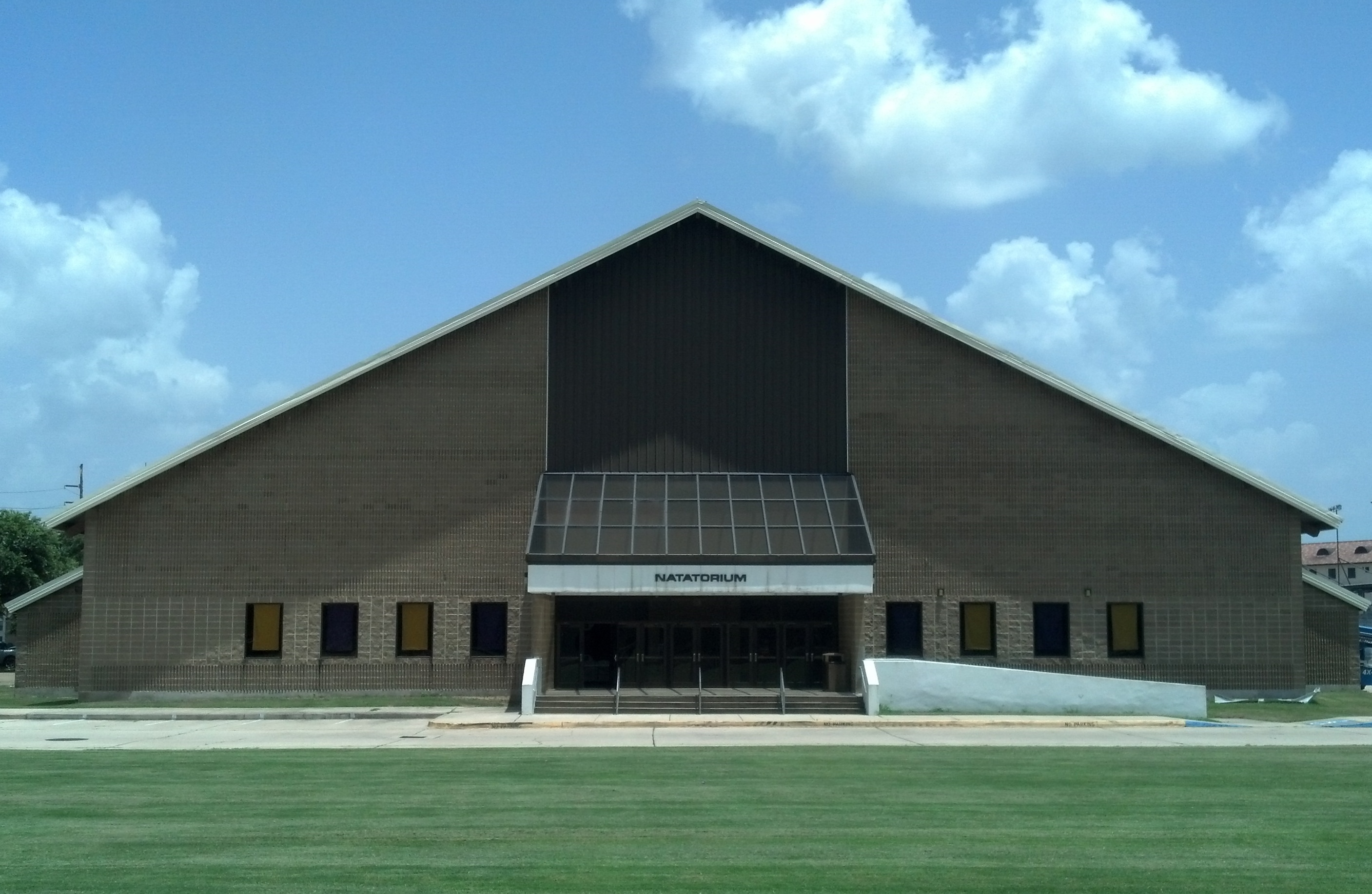
LSU Natatorium exterior (1985–2015)

== See also ==
- LSU Tigers and Lady Tigers
