= Steve Strome =

American tennis coach

Stephen Strome
Current position
- Title: Head coach

Coaching career (HC unless noted)
- 1966–1969: Miami University (AC)
- 1969–1979: Miami University
- 1980–1982: LSU
- 1983–1990: Duke
- 1993–2001: Army

Accomplishments and honors

Championships
- * 7 time Mid-American Conference Championship winner (1972, 1974, 1975, 1976, 1977, 1978, 1979) * 5 time Patriot League Championship winner (1993, 1994, 1995, 2000, 2001)

Awards
- * 5 time Mid-American Conference Coach of the Year (1973, 1974, 1976, 1977, 1979) * 1980 Miami University Hall of Fame inductee * 4 time Patriot League Coach of the Year (1993, 1995, 2000, 2001)

Steve Strome is the former head men's tennis coach at Miami University, Louisiana State University, Duke and Army. Strome also served as the assistant men's basketball coach at Miami University from 1966 to 1969. During his coaching career Strome has received multiple awards including Coach of the Year in more than one conference, won multiple conference championships and was inducted into the Miami University Hall of Fame.

== Coaching career ==
Strome coached the Miami University men's tennis team from 1969 to 1979. In Strome's first year at Miami University his team did not even win one Mid-American Conference match. Strome however went on two win seven Mid-American Conference championships in the following years. He was also named MAC coach of the year five times and lead the Redskins to 27 singles and 14 doubles champions. During his tenure at Miami, Strome was also an assistant basketball coach from 1966 to 1969.

In 1979, Strome announced that he would be leaving Miami University, and would take over as the head tennis coach at LSU for the 1980 season. In 1980, Strome was inducted into the Miami University Hall of Fame. After coaching at LSU until 1982, Strome left LSU with a 46–27 record and took another job at Duke where he served until 1990. Since then Strome has served as head coach of the United States Military Academy, whose team took five league titles. He has also been awarded Coach of the Year multiple times in the Patriot League.
