= John M. Parker Agricultural Coliseum =

Multipurpose indoor arena in Louisiana

- "Cow Palace"
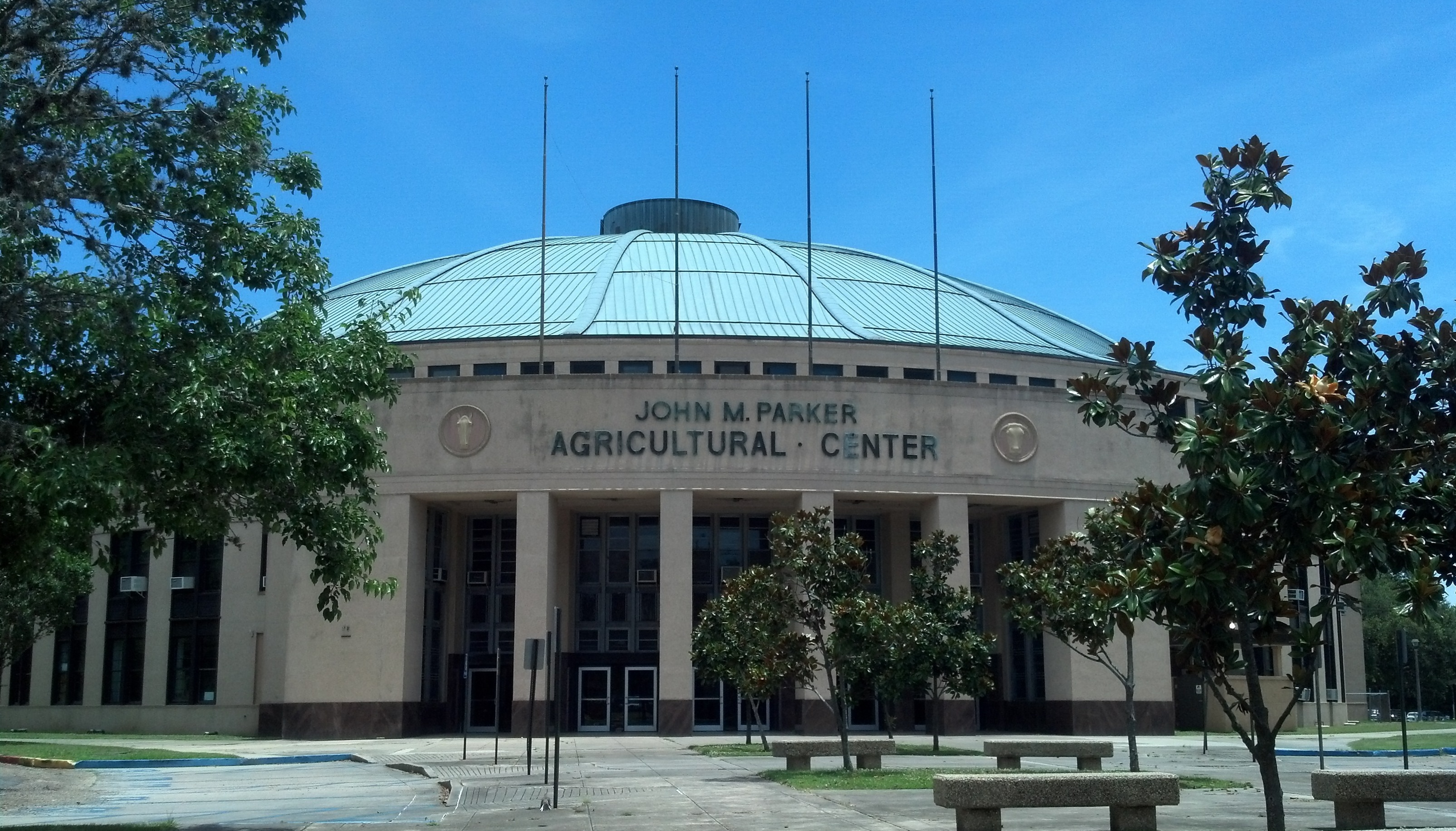
- Interactive map of John M. Parker Agricultural Coliseum
- Location: Baton Rouge, Louisiana, U.S.
- Coordinates: 30.40739°N 91.17445°W
- Owner: Louisiana State University
- Operator: Louisiana State University Agricultural Center
- Capacity: 12,000 (Peak); 6,756 (Current)
- Surface: Multi-surface (portable hardwood for basketball)

Construction
- Opened: 1937
- Architect: Edward F. Neild

Tenants
- Horse shows, livestock shows, rodeos (1937–present); LSU Tigers Men's basketball (1937–1971); LSU Tigers boxing (1937–1956)

The John M. Parker Agricultural Coliseum or John M. Parker Agricultural Center is a 6,756-seat multi-purpose arena in Baton Rouge, Louisiana. It hosts local sporting events, horse shows, livestock shows and concerts.

== History ==
Constructed by the Works Progress Administration, it was opened in 1937 and sat 12,000 people at its peak. At the time of its construction, it was six feet larger than Madison Square Garden, which made it the biggest coliseum in the United States. It is named after John M. Parker, 27th Governor of Louisiana, who pushed to move the campus to its current location during his tenure.

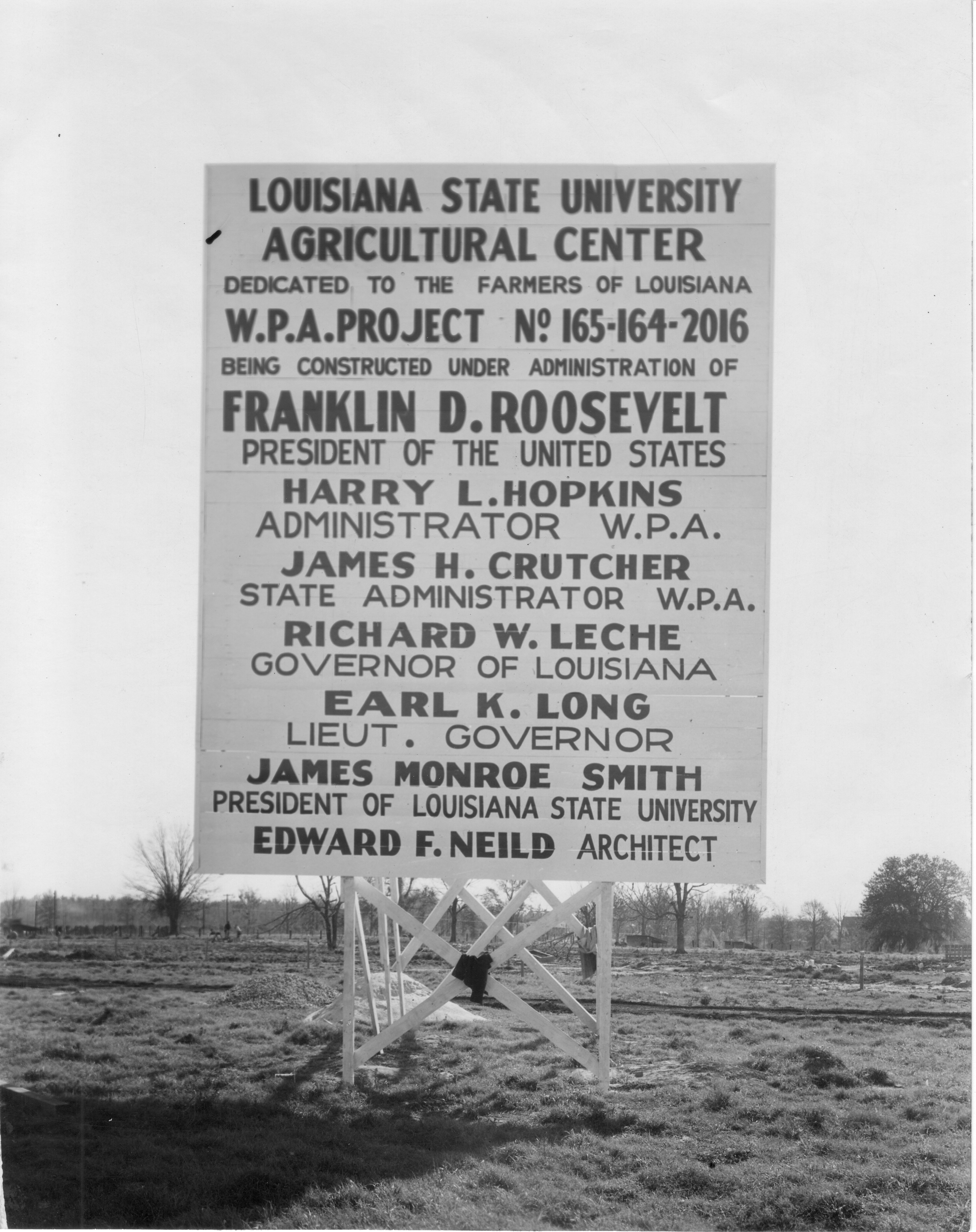
WPA construction sign for the Louisiana State University Agricultural Center (1936)

When it opened in 1937, it became the primary home of the LSU Tigers basketball team, though for several years both the Gym/Armory and the coliseum were used for LSU basketball games. In 1938, the facility hosted the Southeastern Conference men's basketball tournament. In the 1950s, it became the sole home of the LSU Tigers basketball team. In the 1960s, the Coliseum was home to Pete Maravich-led basketball teams and it was his prominence that led to the construction of the LSU Assembly Center which now bears his name.

The basketball team's final season playing in the coliseum was 1970–71. LSU won its final game there, defeating Auburn 114–94 on February 15, 1971.

The former LSU Tigers boxing team held matches at Parker Coliseum and the Huey P. Long Field House. The 1949 LSU boxing team went undefeated in regular season play and finished the year by beating South Carolina in front of 11,000 fans in Parker Coliseum, en route to its first and only national title.

Today, it has reverted to its original purpose as a host of agricultural events, such as rodeos, horse shows, livestock shows, and other events for the LSU AgCenter and the 4-H program. It also serves as the location for Dance Marathon at LSU, which is the only collegiate Dance Marathon program held in an agricultural center.

The rodeo scenes with Matthew McConaughey from his Oscar winning film Dallas Buyers Club were shot at the Coliseum.
