= LSU Strength and Conditioning facility =

Sports training facility at Louisiana State University

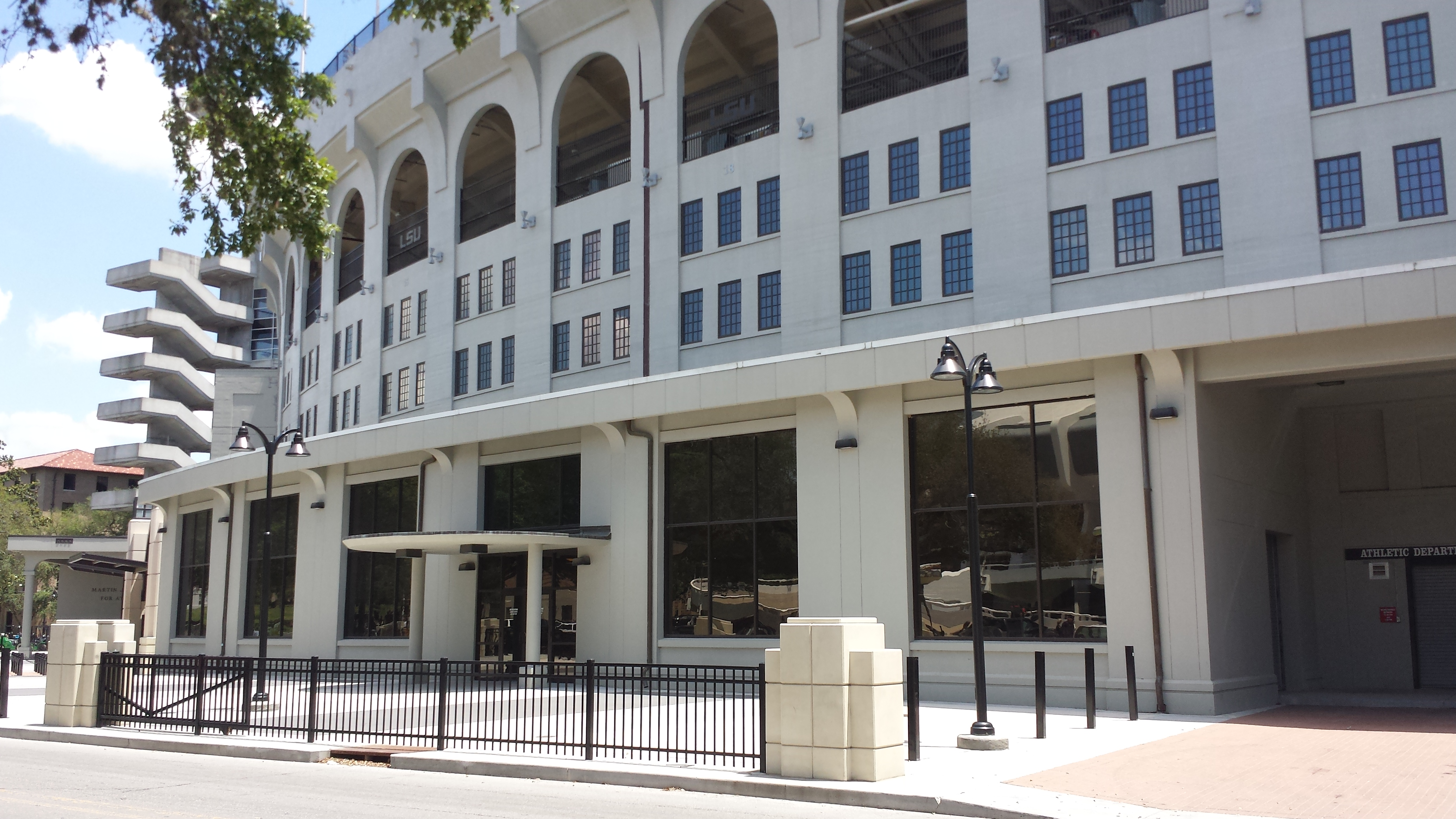
- Interactive map of LSU Strength and Conditioning facility
- Location: North Stadium Drive; Baton Rouge, Louisiana 70803; USA
- Coordinates: 30°24′43″N 91°11′8″W
- Owner: Louisiana State University
- Operator: LSU Athletics Department

Construction
- Opened: 1997

The LSU Strength and Conditioning facility or LSU North Stadium weight room, is a strength training and conditioning facility at Louisiana State University. Built in 1997, it is located adjacent to Tiger Stadium. Measuring 10,000 square feet (930 m^{2}) with a flat surface, it has 28 multi-purpose power stations, 36 assorted selectorized machines and 10 dumbbell stations along with a plyometric specific area, medicine balls, hurdles, plyometric boxes and assorted speed and agility equipment. It also features 2 treadmills, 4 stationary bikes, 2 elliptical cross trainers, a stepper and stepmill.

The facility was originally constructed to house all of LSU's sports teams, but is now home to the men's and women's basketball, gymnastics, softball, men's and women's swimming and diving, men's and women's tennis teams.

== Gallery ==
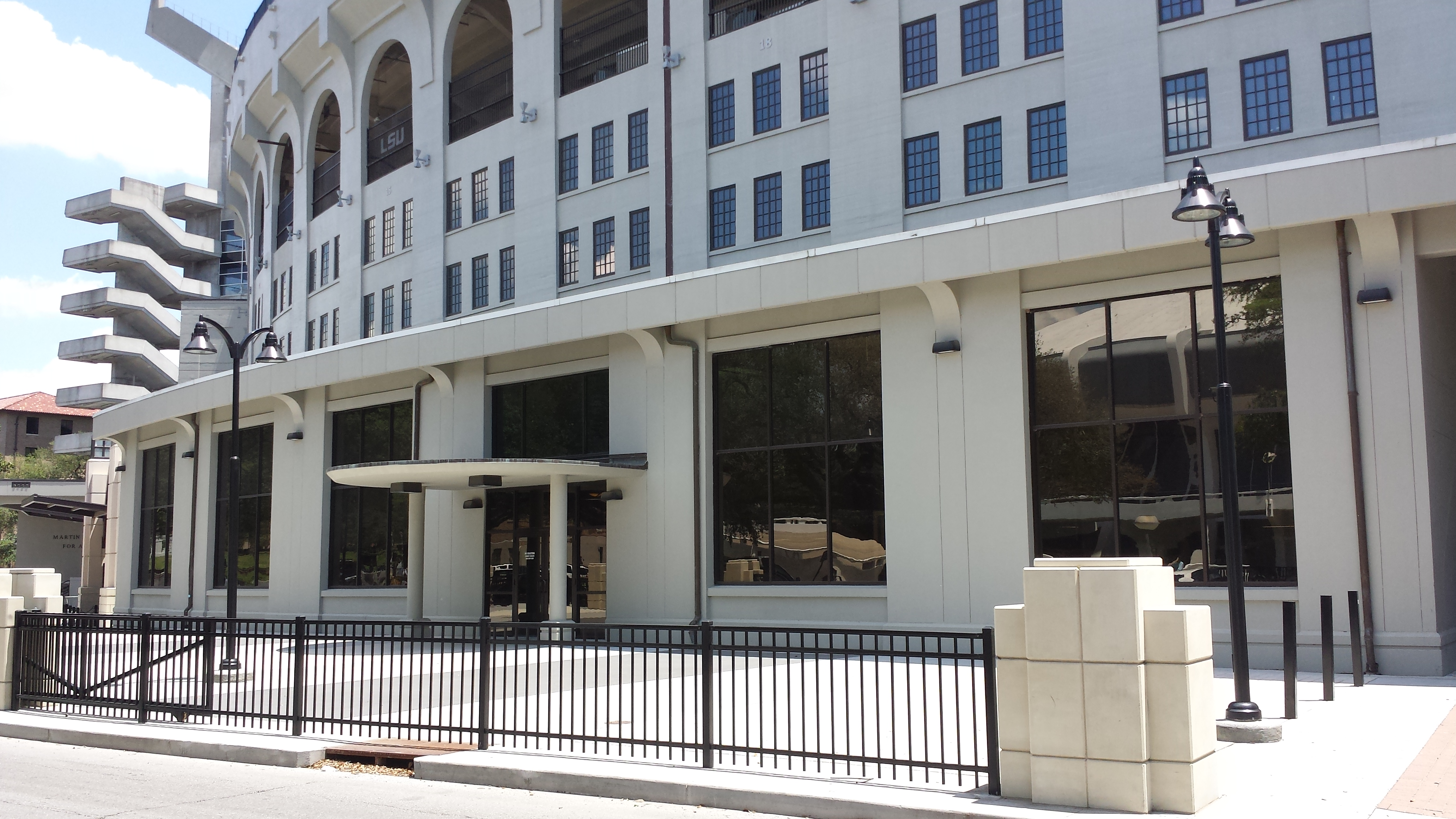
LSU Strength and Conditioning facility

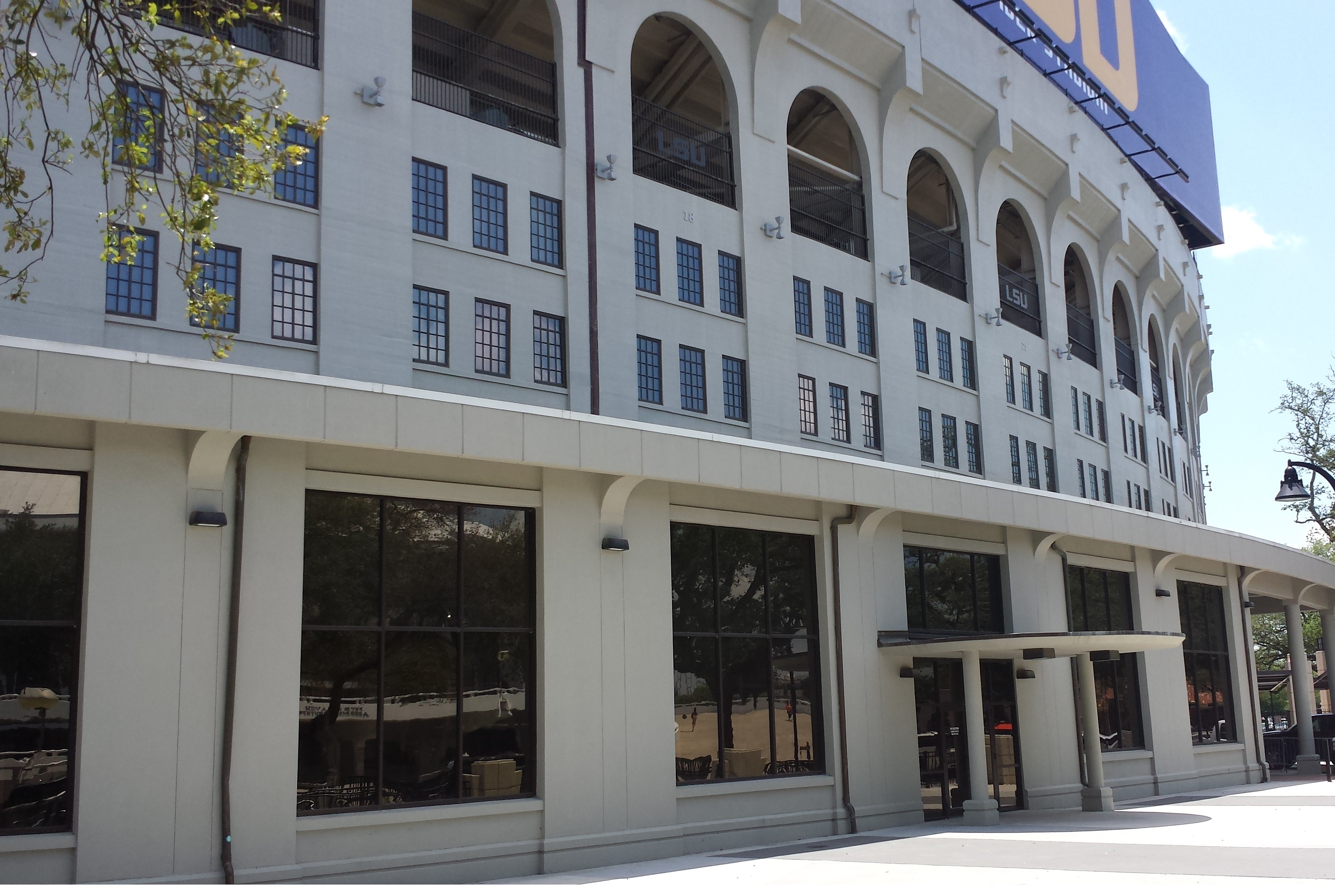
LSU Strength and Conditioning facility - From Victory Hill

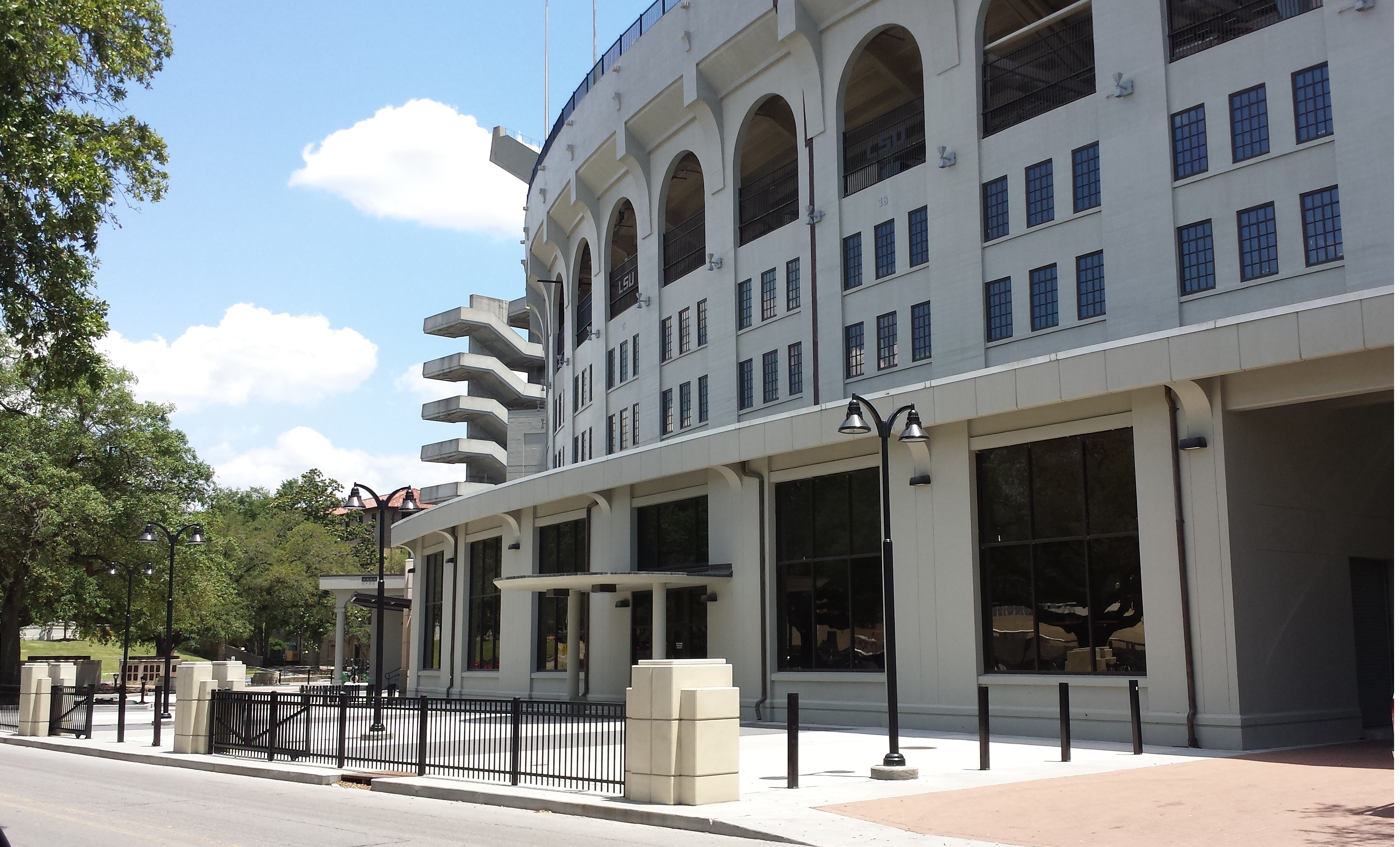
LSU Strength and Conditioning facility - From Nicholson Dr.

== See also ==
- LSU Tigers men's basketball
- LSU Tigers women's basketball
- LSU Lady Tigers gymnastics
- LSU Lady Tigers softball
- LSU Tigers swimming and diving
- LSU Lady Tigers swimming and diving
- LSU Tigers and Lady Tigers
- LSU Football Operations Center
- Bernie Moore Track Stadium
