= LSU Lady Tigers swimming and diving =

- Founded: 1978 (47 years ago)
- Head coach: Rick Bishop and Drew Livingston
- Conference: Southeastern Conference
- Location: Baton Rouge, Louisiana, US
- Home pool: LSU Natatorium
- Colors: Purple and gold

The LSU Lady Tigers swimming and diving team represents Louisiana State University (LSU) in the Southeastern Conference in NCAA women's swimming and diving. The team competes at the LSU Natatorium in Baton Rouge, Louisiana. Rick Bishop is the head coach of the women's swim team. Drew Livingston is the head coach of the women's diving team.

== Olympic & notable swimmers and divers ==
- Heather Brand
- Mandy Leach
- Blanca Morales
- Jane Trepp
- Anne Vilde Tuxen

== Lady Tigers head coaches ==
| Name | Seasons |
|---|---|
| Ivan Harless | 1978–1979 |
| Edward Stickles | 1980 |
| Ivan Harless | 1981–1982 |
| Scott Woodburn | 1983–1985 |
| Sam Freas | 1986–1988 |
| Rick Meador | 1989–2000 |
| Jeff Cavana | 2001–2004 |
| Adam Schmitt | 2005–2010 |
| Rick Bishop and Drew Livingston | 2011–Present |

== Swimming and Diving facilities ==
=== LSU Natatorium ===
The LSU Natatorium is a swimming & diving facility located on the campus of Louisiana State University in Baton Rouge, LA. The facility, built in 1985, serves as the home of the LSU Lady Tigers swimming and diving team. The stadium has a seating capacity of 2,200. The Natatorium features a 50-meter pool, which can be converted into two 25-meter or 25-yard pools with the use of bulkheads and includes a championship diving well with one- and three-meter springboards and five-, seven- and 10-meter platforms.

=== Huey P. Long Field House ===
The Huey P. Long Field House was home to the Lady Tigers swimming and diving teams until the LSU Natatorium was built in 1985.

== Strength and Conditioning facilities ==
=== LSU Strength and Conditioning facility ===
The LSU Tigers basketball strength training and conditioning facility is located in the LSU Strength and Conditioning facility. Built in 1997, it is located adjacent to Tiger Stadium. Measuring 10,000-square feet with a flat surface, it has 28 multi-purpose power stations, 36 assorted selectorized machines and 10 dumbbell stations along with a plyometric specific area, medicine balls, hurdles, plyometric boxes and assorted speed and agility equipment. It also features 2 treadmills, 4 stationary bikes, 2 elliptical cross trainers, a stepper and stepmill.

== See also ==
- List of college swimming and diving teams
