= Collegiate Nationals =

Multisport event for US college students

The Collegiate Nationals was a multisport event for college students across the United States. The events aired annually on CBS College Sports Network from 2006 through 2012. In 2009 the name was changed to "The Alt Games."

The Nationals included competitions in sports not sanctioned by the National Collegiate Athletic Association (NCAA). Events were open to accredited students at both four-year and two-year schools. For at least nine of the sports, the contests were the established national championship competitions that had previously existed and were conducted by their respective collegiate sport governing bodies.

The telecasts were produced by Echo Entertainment and marketed by Highline Sports on behalf of CBS College Sports.

== Sports offered ==
- Adventure racing
- Beach volleyball
- Boxing
- Competitive eating
- Flowboarding (similar to surfing)
- Freeskiing
- Paintball
- Skateboarding
- Skydiving (Note: The skydiving segment appeared on CBS' "Alt Games" telecast on April 30, 2010. The segment was recorded in December 2009 at the USA Parachute Association collegiate championship.)
- Snowboarding
- Surfing
- Triathlon
- Ultimate
- Wakeboarding
- Weightlifting
- Whitewater kayaking

In addition, there were film and music competitions.

Sport	2006	2007	2008	2009	2010	2011	2012	Total appearances
Adventure racing	✗	✓	✗	✗	✗	✗	✗	1
Beach volleyball	✓	✓	✓	✓	✓	✓	✓	7
Boxing	✓	✓	✓	✗	✗	✗	✗	3
Competitive Eating	✗	✗	✓	✓	✗	✗	✗	2
Flowboarding	✗	✓	✓	✓	✓	✓	✗	5
Freeskiing	✗	✓	✓	✓	✓	✓	✗	5
Paintball	✓	✗	✗	✗	✗	✗	✗	1
Skateboarding	✗	✗	✗	✗	✗	✓	✓	2
Skydiving	✗	✗	✗	✗	✓	✗	✗	1
Snowboarding	✓	✓	✓	✓	✓	✓	✗	6
Surfing	✗	✗	✗	✗	✗	✓	✓	2
Triathlon	✓	✗	✗	✗	✗	✗	✗	1
Ultimate	✗	✗	✓	✗	✓	✓	✓	4
Wakeboarding	✓	✓	✓	✓	✓	✓	✓	7
Weightlifting	✗	✓	✓	✗	✗	✗	✗	2
Whitewater kayaking	✓	✓	✗	✗	✓	✗	✗	3
Total each year	7	9	9	6	8	8	5	52

== History ==
The Nationals were launched in 2006. The site of the first event was the Reno-Lake Tahoe area in Nevada. For its second year (2007), the Nationals expanded to include events at Mission Bay in San Diego, California.

There were more changes in 2008, as the snowboarding event was moved to the Keystone ski resort near Boulder, Colorado. The competitive eating and ultimate competitions were also added that year. Also, the Nationals debuted on terrestrial television when CBS Sports aired the first of eight one-hour episodes on May 25.

== Beach volleyball ==
In 2006, the AVP sanctioned a combine that selected 8 players from 8 colleges and paired them into teams (title was won by Bibiana Candelas (USC)/Paula Gentil (Minnesota)). In 2007 Nebraska (Jordan Larson/Sarah Pavan) won an invitational competition of 8 colleges, which featured only two players per school, as opposed to entire teams. 2008 saw Texas win an invitational, sponsored by AVCA and AVP, involving 6 schools with four pairs teams each. In 2009, USC prevailed over an invited field of 8 colleges with four pairs teams each. In 2010, the competition reverted to one pairs team per school, with 12 colleges invited; it was won by Loyola Marymount (Emily Day/Heather Hughes). The two-player team format continued in 2011, except that players were paired with different partners from other schools for every match, until the semi-final winners were determined. That year there was also a men's competition in the same format. In 2012, the event was conducted by the American Volleyball Coaches Association and featured Long Beach State vs. Pepperdine in the final.

== Hosts ==
The 2008 event hosts were Jonny Moseley, Olympic champion in moguls skiing, and Jenn Brown. Carter Blackburn was the boxing announcer, and Chris McGee and Holly McPeak called the beach volleyball matches.

== Sponsors ==
Because the event was not NCAA-sanctioned, sponsors could display their advertising at the competition venues. In 2008, they included Edge shave gel and Jack in the Box.

== Additional information ==
Of the events on the Collegiate Nationals/Alt Games program, only two had any ties to actual NCAA sports at the time. Many of the beach volleyball players also played in the indoor version of the game; beach volleyball later became an NCAA sport that held its first official championship in 2016. Boxing was an NCAA-sanctioned sport until 1961, when the death of a boxer who attended Wisconsin caused the organization to drop the sport.
