= Louisiana State Seminary of Learning & Military Academy =

State institution of higher education that became Louisiana State University

Lithograph of seminary building

The Louisiana State Seminary of Learning & Military Academy was the former name of the current university now known as Louisiana State University (LSU).

The original legislation creating the Seminary of Learning of the State of Louisiana (l'Université de l'Etat de la Louisiane) was passed by the Louisiana General Assembly in 1853. This was to be a state institution of higher education.

== Background ==
In November 1859, the institution's main building was completed near Pineville, Louisiana. The original location of the Old LSU Site is listed on the National Register of Historic Places. The institution's first superintendent was Major, later Colonel, William Tecumseh Sherman, who would go on to become a high-ranking general in the Union Army during the Civil War

On January 2, 1860, the college opened with five professors and 19 cadets. In March 1860, the school's name was changed to Louisiana State Seminary of Learning & Military Academy (le Lycee Scientifique et Militaire de l'Etat de la Louisiane). The state's general assembly allowed for as many as 150 cadets, with scholarships for boarding expenses. The total number of cadets eventually reached 73. The cadets were referred to as "beneficiary" cadets.

After the state of Louisiana seceded from the Union in January 1861, Colonel Sherman resigned as superintendent of the school to return north and eventually resume his service in the Union Army. In April 1861, large numbers of students and faculty began resigning in order to enlist in the Confederate military. On June 30, 1861, the seminary closed. It later reopened on April 1, 1862 with Rev. W.E.M. Linfield as acting superintendent.

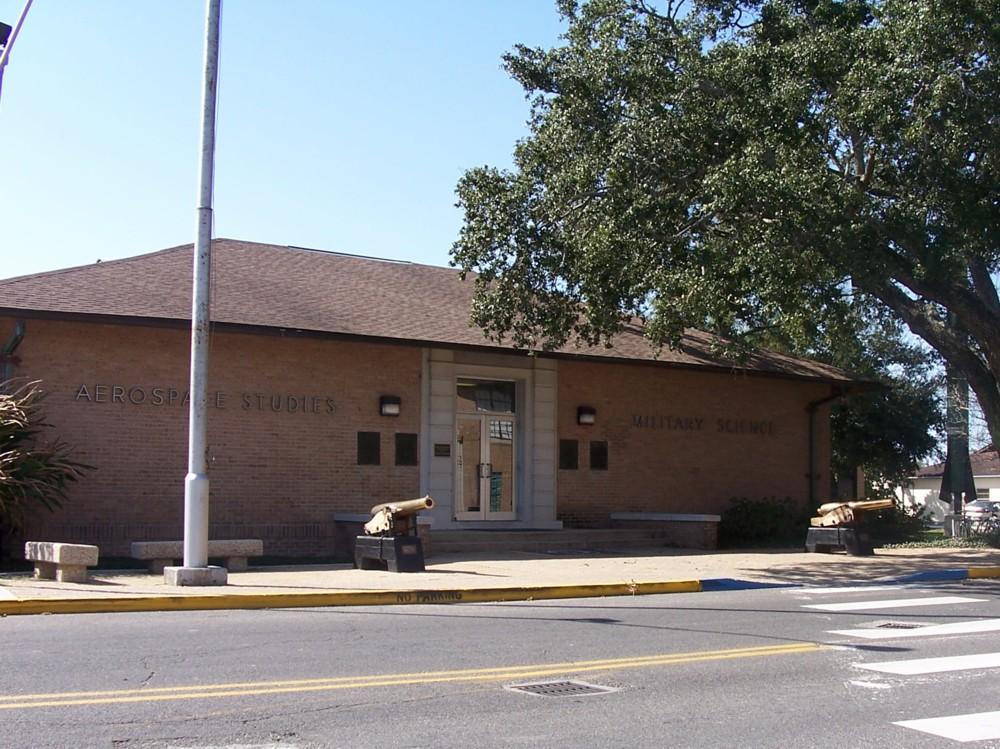
Cannons donated by Gen. Sherman from the Civil War in front of LSU's Military Science/Aerospace Studies Building

On April 1, 1863, Prof. William A. Seay became superintendent. On April 23, 1863, the seminary again closed down due to the invasion in the area of Union forces in the Red River Campaign. Before being captured, the college's military equipment was donated to the Confederate Army. The school's library and other items were destroyed by order of Gen. T. Kilby Smith of the U.S. Army. The school's building was saved due to a request by Gen. W. T. Sherman, the school's former superintendent.

After the end of the Civil War, in April 1865, the seminary was again reopened on October 2, 1865, with Col. David F. Boyd as superintendent. Following the war, General Sherman donated two cannons to the institution. According to legend, these cannons had been captured from Confederate forces and had been used to start the war when fired at Fort Sumter, South Carolina. However, as the cannons in question were manufactured in Massachusetts in 1861, this bit of folklore is most likely untrue. They are still currently on display in front of LSU's Military Science/Aerospace Studies Building.

On October 15, 1869, the college's building was lost in a fire. On November 1, 1869, classes were resumed in Baton Rouge, Louisiana. In March 1870 the school's name was changed to Louisiana State University (l'Universite' de l'Etat de la Louisiane).
