= Watson Brake =

Archaeological site in Louisiana, US

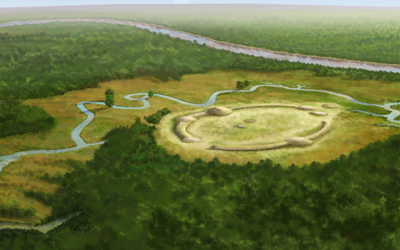
- Artist's conception of the Watson Brake Site

- Location within Louisiana today Watson Brake (North America)
- 32°22′6.31″N 92°7′53.00″W
- Cultures: Archaic period
- Location: Logtown, Ouachita Parish, Louisiana, US
- Region: Ouachita Parish, Louisiana

History
- Built: 3500 BCE

Watson Brake is an archaeological site in present-day Ouachita Parish, Louisiana, from the Archaic period. Dated to about 5400 years ago (approx. 3500 BCE), Watson Brake is considered the oldest earthwork mound complex in North America. It is older than the Ancient Egyptian pyramids or Britain’s Stonehenge. Its discovery and dating in a paper published in 1997 changed the ideas of American archaeologists about ancient cultures in the Southeastern United States and their ability to manage large, complex projects over centuries. The archeologists revised their date of the oldest earthwork construction by nearly 2000 years, as well as having to recognize that it was developed over centuries by a hunter-gatherer society, rather than by what was known to be more common of other, later mound sites: a more sedentary society dependent on maize cultivation and with a hierarchical, centralized polity.

The arrangement of human-made mounds at Watson Brake was constructed over centuries by members of a hunter-gatherer society. It is located near Watson Bayou in the floodplain of the Ouachita River, near present-day Monroe in northern Louisiana, United States. Watson Brake consists of an oval formation of eleven earthwork mounds from three to 25 feet (7.6 m) in height, connected by ridges to form an oval nearly 900 feet (270 m) across.

Watson Brake is dated to 1,900 years before the better-known Poverty Point in northern Louisiana; begun about 1500 BCE, it was previously thought to be the earliest mound site in North America. Mound building in the Americas started at an early date.

The discovery and dating of Watson Brake as a Middle Archaic site demonstrate that the pre-agricultural, pre-ceramic, indigenous cultures within the territory of the present-day United States were much more complex than previously thought. While primarily hunter-gatherers, they planned and organized large work forces over centuries to accomplish the complex mound and ridge constructions. Monumental constructions have marked the rise of social complexity worldwide. The earthen mounds of Eastern North America are part of mankind's monument tradition.

== Discovery and dating ==
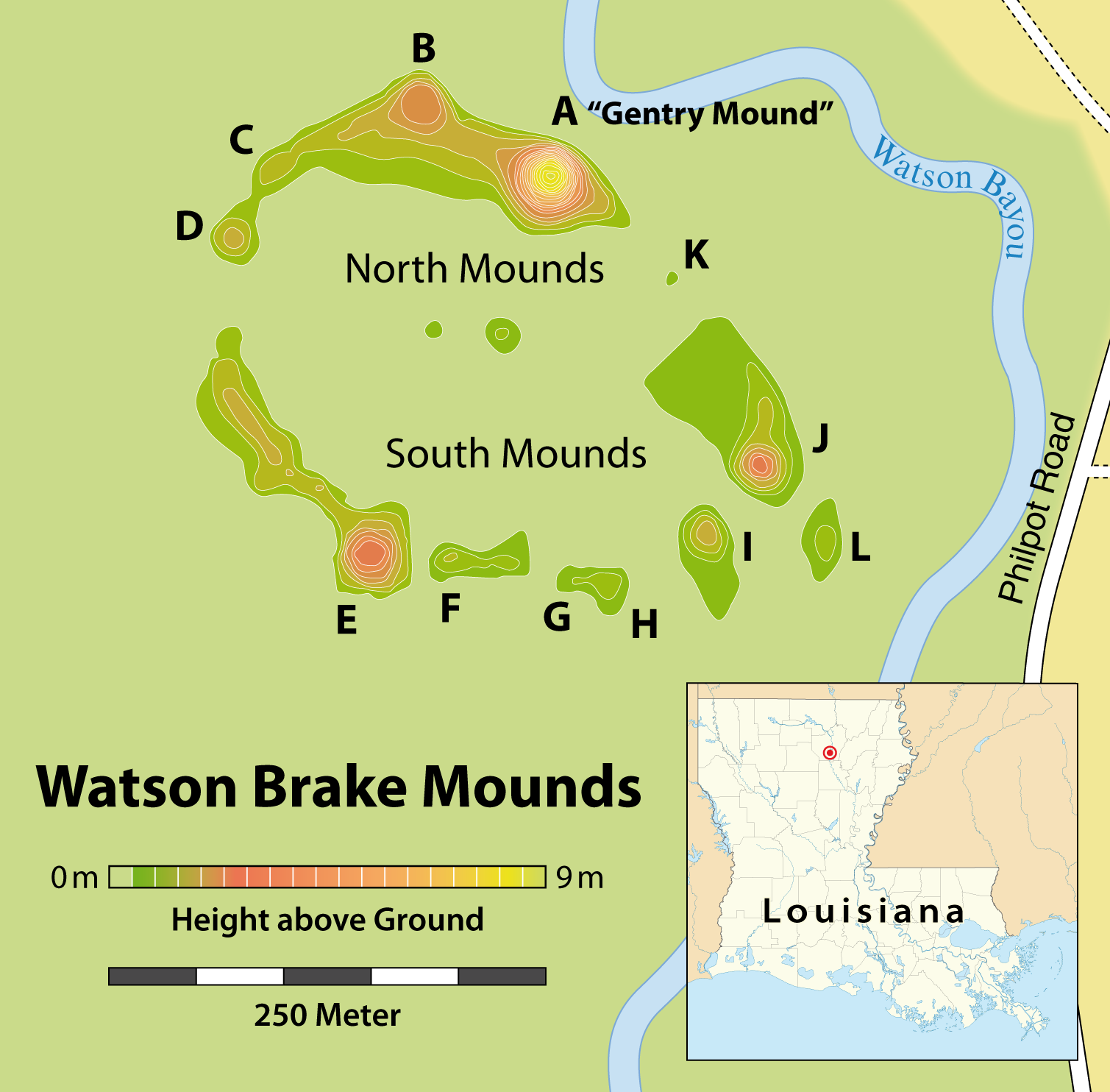
Schematic plan of the Watson Brake Site

In the early 1980s, Reca Bamburg Jones, a local resident, brought this site to the attention of professional archaeologists. By 1981, after logging had revealed more of the site, Jones identified the pattern of eleven mounds connected by ridges, a complex that was 280 yards across. In 1983, Jones and John Belmont published the site in a survey of pre-history in the Ouachita River Valley. Around this time Joe W. Saunders, then regional archaeologist for the state, was shown the site.

The site had been privately controlled since the 1950s. Approximately half the site is still owned by several family members, who have allowed archaeological excavations and associated work, but do not permit public viewing. Recognizing the site's significance, in 1996 The Archaeological Conservancy purchased half the site and later sold it to the state for preservation.

Since the 1990s, radiocarbon dating by a team from Northeast Louisiana University established the great antiquity of the site. The team of Joe W. Saunders et al. published a paper in Science in 1997 that established the age of the mound complex.

The analysis of 27 radiocarbon dates indicates that the site was initially occupied around 4000 BCE during the Middle Archaic period. Mound construction began at approximately 3500 BCE, and continued for approximately 500 years. During that time period, the mounds were enlarged in several stages. Excavations indicate that there was sufficient time between building episodes for midden deposits of residents to accumulate on top of the mounds and ridges. In addition, teams from the University of Texas at Austin and the University of Washington dated the site by using sand grains and organic acids in the soils.

Evidence of the middens indicate that Watson Brake may have been used as a "base by mobile hunter-gatherers from summer through fall." Saunders and his team suggest that the building episodes at Watson Brake coincide with periods of unpredictable rainfall caused by El Niño-Southern Oscillation events. They may represent "a communal response to new stresses of droughts and flooding that created a suddenly more unpredictable food base." Midden remains showed the population relied on fish, shellfish, and riverine animals, supplemented by local annuals: goosefoot (Chenopodium berlandieri), knotweed (Polygonum spp.), and possibly marshelder (Iva annua). Over time, the people consumed more terrestrial animals, such as deer, turkey, raccoon, opossum, squirrel, and rabbits, which was likely related to changing habitat and waterway conditions. The site appears to have been abandoned around 2800 BCE. This may have been caused by a "decline in the main channel, gravel/sand shoal habitats, backwater swamps, and small-stream habitats" near the site.

Together with other Middle Archaic sites in Louisiana and Florida, Watson Brake shows the development of complex societies among hunter-gatherer peoples. They occupied the site only on a seasonal basis, but were capable of planning and organizing complex monumental construction over a period of several hundred years.

In contrast to Poverty Point, where residents made projectile points with materials traded from distant locations, including Wisconsin and Tennessee, the artifacts of Watson Brake show local materials and production. The projectile points are Middle to Late Archaic in age, and were produced more casually than those at Poverty Point. The people heated local gravel for cooking stones to steam some of their food. They created and fired earthenware items in a variety of shapes, but researchers have not yet determined their functions.

== Ownership and management ==
Eight members of the Gentry family have owned most of the site since the 1950s. One member declines to sell property to the state, so the site is not available for public viewing. The family has granted specific permission to individual archaeologists to conduct research on site.

== See also ==
- Marsden Mounds
- LSU Campus Mounds
