= Louisiana State University Corps of Cadets =

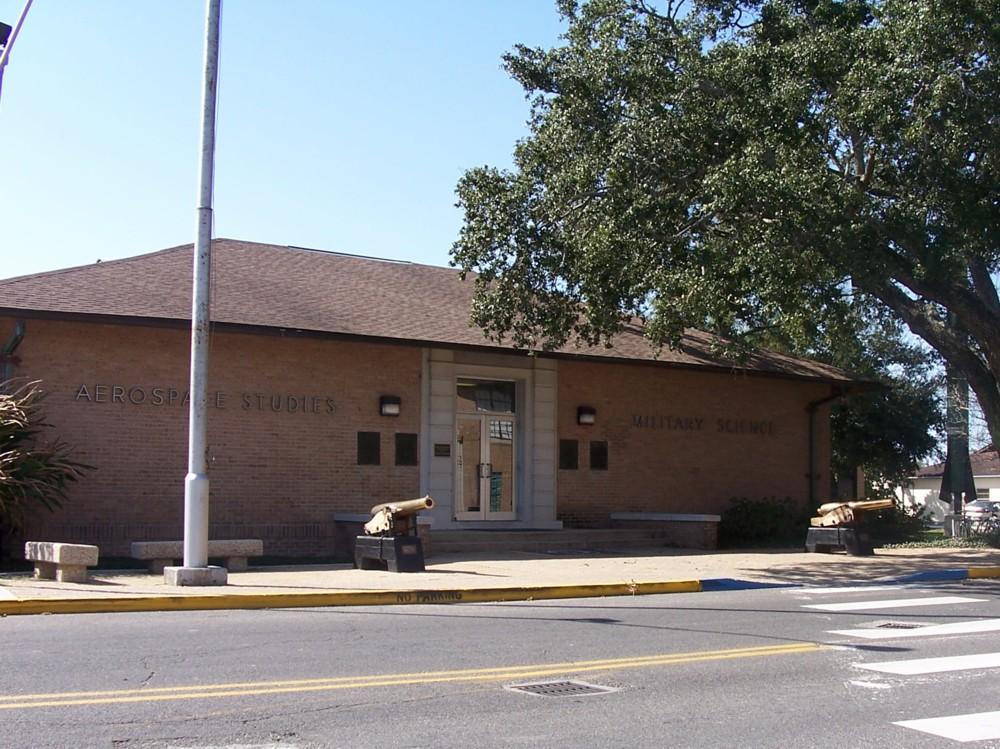
The corps headquarters, the LSU Military Science building,

The Louisiana State University Corps of Cadets is a student-run military organization at Louisiana State University. Students who elect to join the Corps must participate in mandatory Reserve Officer Training Corps (ROTC) courses, and may receive commissions as officers in the United States armed forces upon graduation. Current membership exceeds 300 cadets in LSU's Army and Air Force Reserve Officer Training Corps, and includes midshipmen in the Naval ROTC program at Southern University

== History ==
=== Origins ===
The program's roots trace back to LSU's founding in 1860 under General William T. Sherman, when the campus functioned as a former military post of the Union Army adjacent to present-day Baton Rouge. In 1884, the General Assembly of Louisiana passed a resolution allocating the full usage of the buildings and grounds of the Pentagon Barracks to LSU, where they were used as dormitories for cadets. Cadets were housed there until 1932.

=== Post-World War II and deactivation ===
During World War II, LSU was in the top five schools producing officers for the military, after Texas A&M University, the United States Military Academy, and the United States Naval Academy. Amidst the backdrop of the Vietnam War in the 1960s, the LSU Board of Supervisors converted the ROTC program to voluntary status due to escalating tensions on campus. In 1969, mandatory ROTC for freshmen and sophomores at LSU at large was abolished. The Corps at the time consisted of over 3,000 members, a number which experienced a decline post-1969.

=== Reactivation and modern era ===
The corps was formally reactivated in November 2025.. On 30 September 2026, Secretary of Defense Pete Hegseth announced that LSU, among others, would given the title of Distinguished Military Colleges as part of America's Corps of Cadets, creating a new pathway for officer commissioning in the same manner as the existing United States senior military colleges.

== Constituent ROTC units ==
- Tiger Battalion (Army ROTC)
- Detachment 310 (Air Force ROTC)
- Southern University Redstick Battalion (Naval ROTC)

== Commandant of Cadets ==
No.	Name	Term		Branch	Notes and Reference
No.	Name	Took office	Left office	Branch	Notes and Reference
	Major General Sanderford Jarman	1916	1917		
	Troy Middleton	1930	1936		
	Colonel Wade Pertuit	2013	2016	United States Air Force	
69	Colonel Lisa O’Neil	2021	2023	United States Air Force	
70	Lieutenant Colonel Terry L. Kostellic	2023	2025	United States Air Force	
71	Colonel Joseph Musacchia	2025	Present	United States Air Force	

== See also ==
- Texas A&M University Corps of Cadets
