= LSU Campus Mounds =

Mound complex in Louisiana

- U.S. National Register of Historic Places
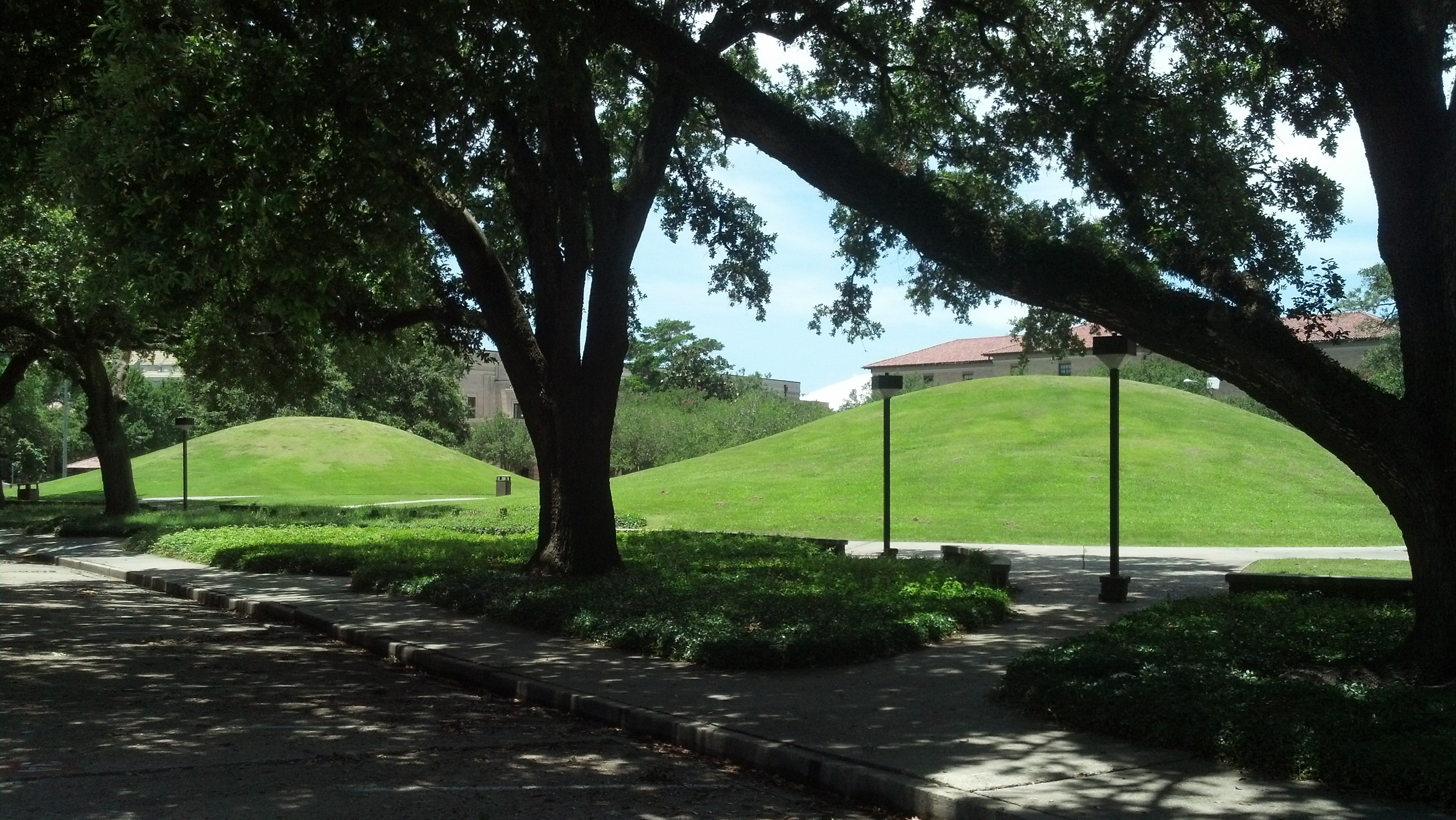

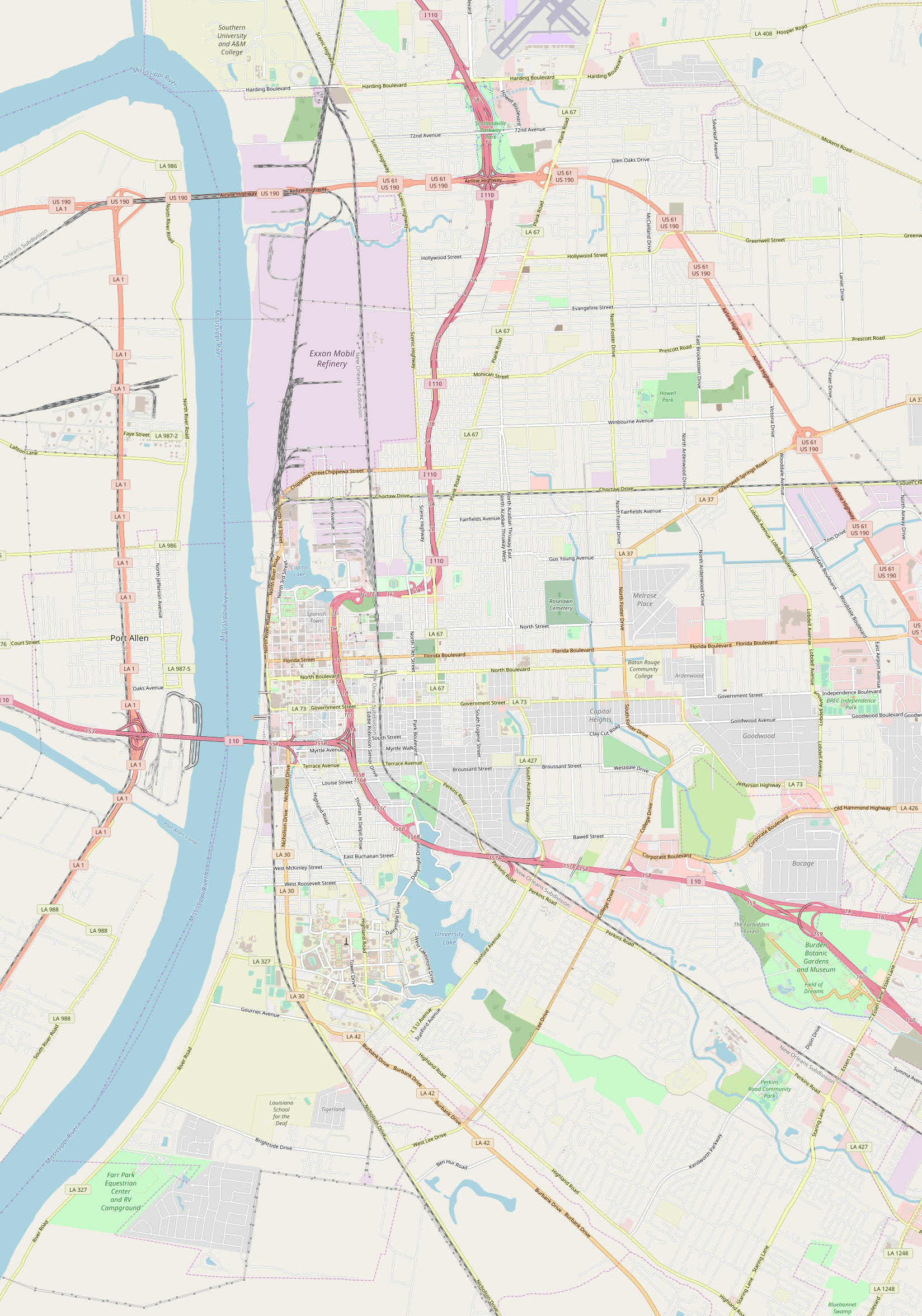
- Location within Baton Rouge
- Location: Along Field House Drive, on Louisiana State University Campus, Baton Rouge, Louisiana
- Coordinates: 30°24′54″N 91°10′56″W
- Area: 2 acres (0.81 ha)
- Architectural style: Earthen mounds
- NRHP reference No.: 99000236
- Added to NRHP: March 1, 1999

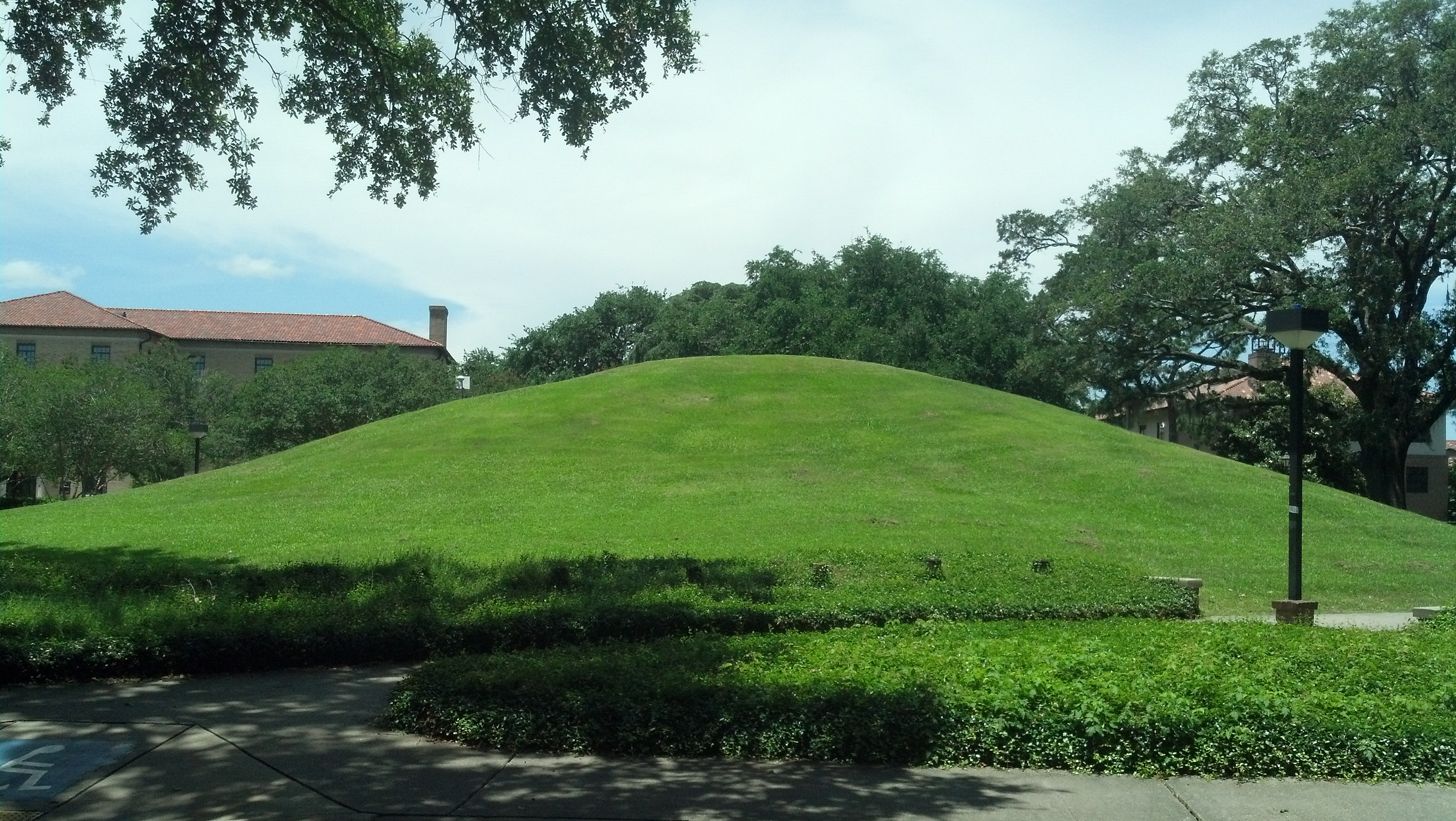
LSU Campus Mound

The LSU Campus Mounds or LSU Indian Mounds are two Native American mounds of the Archaic Period, on the campus of Louisiana State University in Baton Rouge, Louisiana. Construction on the 20-foot-tall (6.1 m) mounds began more than 11,000 years ago, and may have continued until 5,000 years ago. They predate the Great Pyramids of Egypt.

== History ==
The mounds were built thousands of years ago on a spot overlooking the floodplain of the Mississippi River in what is now Baton Rouge, Louisiana, and the site of Louisiana State University. The northern mound consists of hard clay dirt; the southern mound is more porous. The scholarly consensus is that they were used for "ceremonial and marking point purposes," rather than for burial. They are part of a larger, statewide system of mounds.

They were first dated in 1982. In 2009, LSU professor Brooks Ellwood took core samples that revealed a layer of charcoal, possibly from a pit barbecue or a cremation. Additional excavation work was done in 2011, 2012, and 2018. Based on his analysis of the material found within the mounds, Ellwood conjectures that they contain cremated human remains and are substantially older than the existing consensus, as much as 11,300 years old.

== Preservation ==
Due to their location in a heavily trafficked area of campus, the mounds began to show signs of degradation as well as natural erosion. To alleviate the issue, the university installed a sidewalk between the mounds in 1985. In addition, a low brick wall was placed around the mounds in order to prevent vehicles from dangerously crossing the mounds. Erosion continued to take its toll until a restoration project was initiated in 1996. Using river silt, the LSU Facility Services patched damage on both mounds and seeded a hybrid Bermuda grass to prevent future problems.

The mounds were listed on the National Register of Historic Places on March 1, 1999.

In 2010, LSU announced the "Save the Mounds" campaign to preserve the mounds. Officials from the school stated that the mounds had suffered internal structural damage that would lead to their eventual collapse. While they were formerly used for tailgate parties, in 2010 they began to be fenced off during LSU's home football games to prevent them from being damaged.

== See also ==
- Mississippi Valley: Culture, phase, and chronological periods table
- National Register of Historic Places listings in East Baton Rouge Parish, Louisiana
- Poverty Point
- Watson Brake
