= Louisiana State University =

Public university in Baton Rouge, Louisiana, US

Louisiana State University and Agricultural and Mechanical College
- Official LSU seal
- Former names: Seminary of Learning of the State of Louisiana (1853–1861); Louisiana State University Agricultural & Mechanical College (1874–1877); University of Louisiana (1913–1921); Louisiana State University (1860–1913; 1922–1963)
- Type: Public land-grant research university
- Established: January 2, 1860; 166 years ago
- Parent institution: Louisiana State University System
- Accreditation: SACS
- Academic affiliations: URA; ORAU; sea-grant; space-grant
- Endowment: $1.24 billion (2025)(system-wide)
- Chancellor: James T. Dalton
- President: Wade Rousse
- Faculty: 1,500
- Administrative staff: 5,000
- Students: 42,016 (fall 2024)
- Undergraduates: 34,502
- Postgraduates: 7,514
- Location: Baton Rouge, Louisiana, United States; 30°24′52″N 91°10′42″W
- Campus: 4,925 acres (1,993 ha); Midsize city
- Newspaper: The Daily Reveille
- Colors: Purple and gold
- Nickname: Tigers and Lady Tigers
- Sporting affiliations: NCAA Division I FBS – SEC; CCSA
- Mascot: Mike the Tiger
- Website: lsu.edu
- Louisiana State University, Baton Rouge
- U.S. National Register of Historic Places
- U.S. Historic district
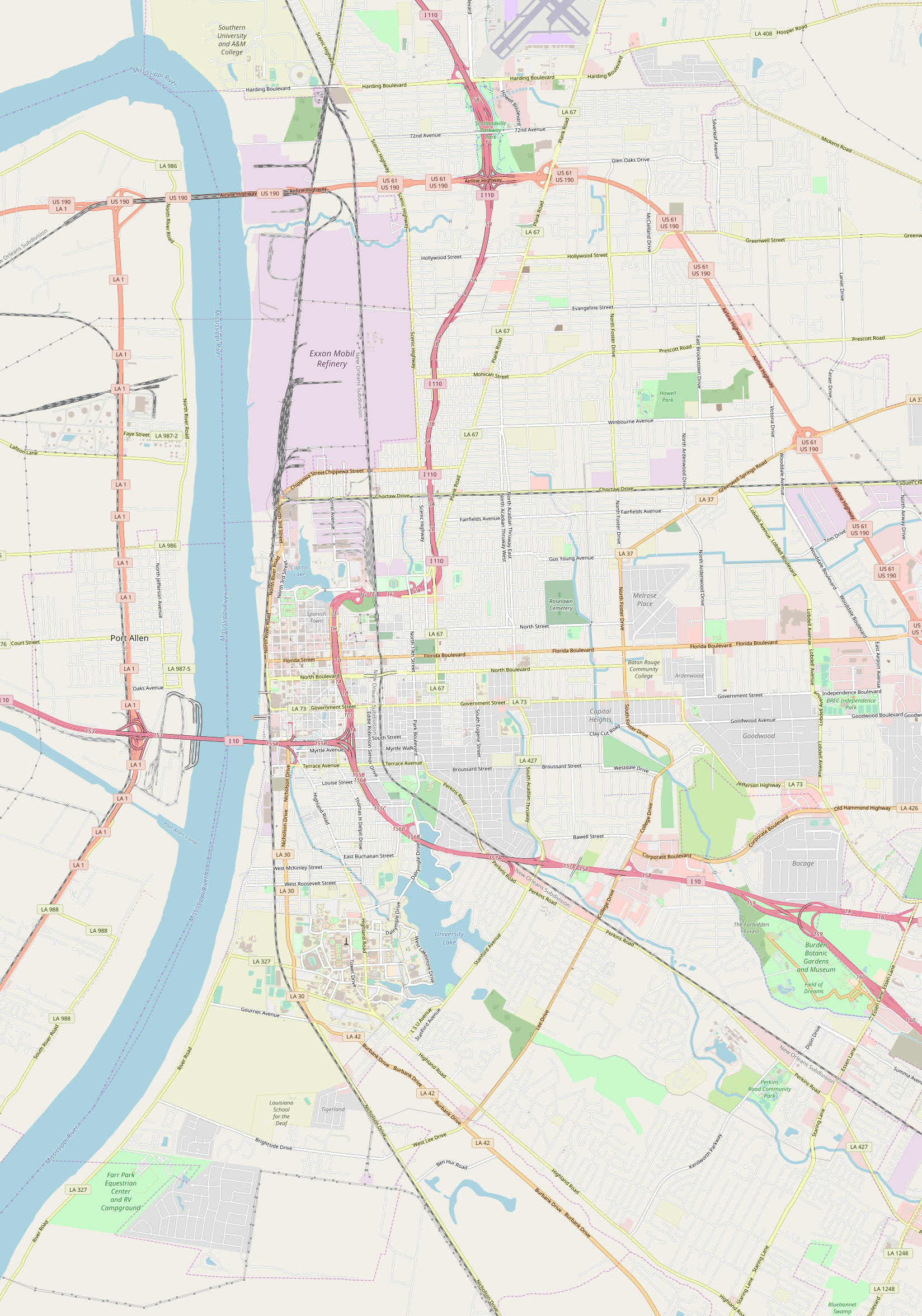
- Location within Baton Rouge

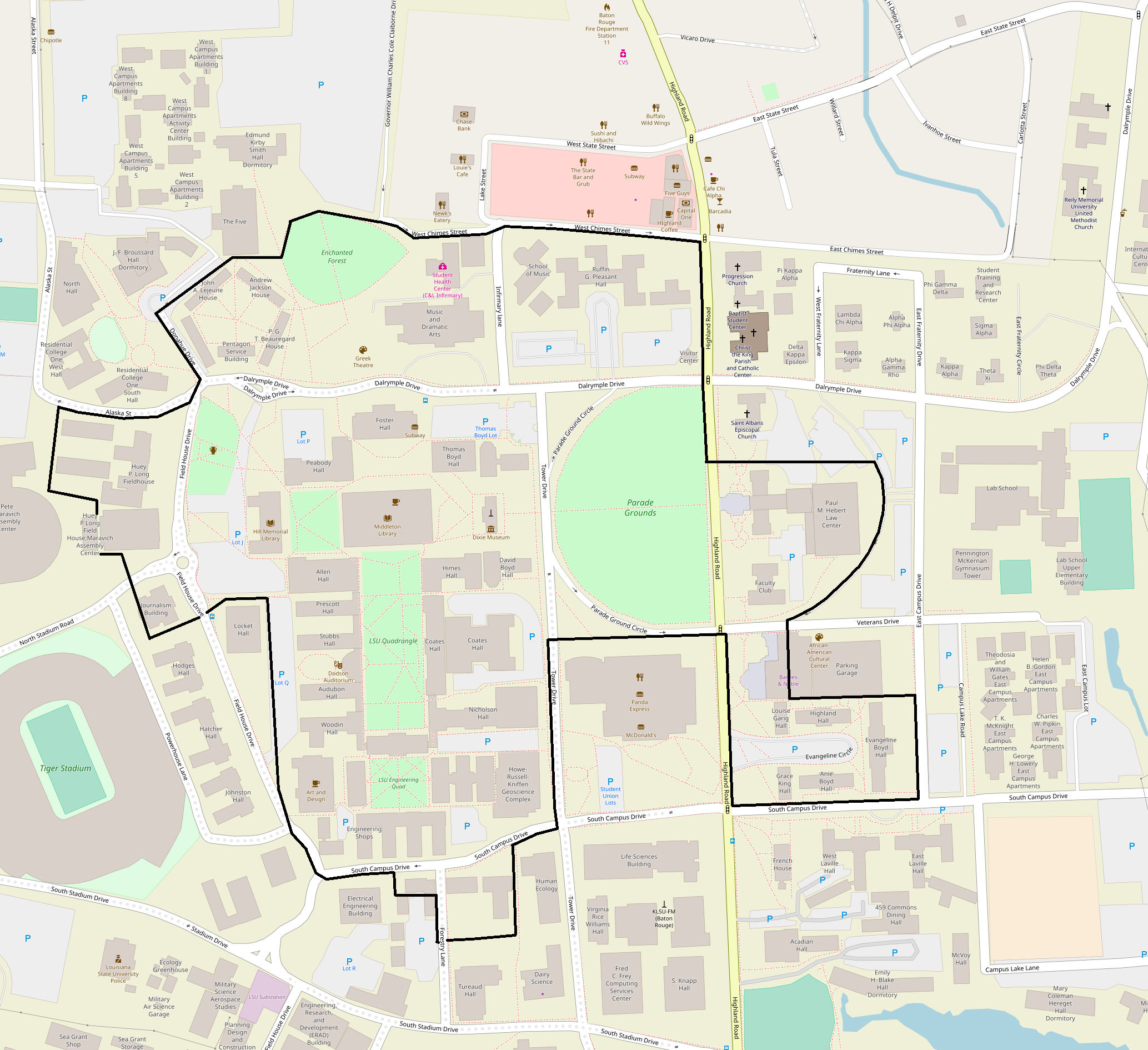
- Location: Highland Road, Baton Rouge
- Coordinates: 30°24′52″N 91°10′42″W
- Area: 95 acres (38 ha)
- Built: 1920s
- Built by: Works Progress Administration
- Architects: Theodore C. Link; Wogan & Bernard; Weiss, Dreyfous & Seiferth; Neild, Somdal & Neild
- Architectural style: Italian Renaissance
- NRHP reference No.: 88001586 (original); 100010174 (increase)

Significant dates
- Added to NRHP: September 15, 1988
- Boundary increase: April 10, 2024

Louisiana State University and Agricultural and Mechanical College, commonly referred to as Louisiana State University (LSU), is an American public land-grant research university in Baton Rouge, Louisiana, United States. The university was founded in 1860 near Pineville, Louisiana, under the name Louisiana State Seminary of Learning & Military Academy. The current LSU main campus was dedicated in 1926 and consists of more than 250 buildings constructed in the style of Italian Renaissance architect Andrea Palladio, occupying a 650-acre (260 ha) plateau on the banks of the Mississippi River.

LSU is the flagship university of the state of Louisiana, as well as the flagship institution of the Louisiana State University System. In 2021, the university enrolled over 28,000 undergraduate and more than 4,500 graduate students in 14 schools and colleges. It is classified among "R1: Doctoral Universities – Very high research activity".

LSU's athletics department fields teams in 21 varsity sports (9 men's, 12 women's), and is a member of the National Collegiate Athletic Association (NCAA) and the Southeastern Conference (SEC). The university is represented by its mascot, Mike the Tiger.

== History ==
=== 19th century ===
Louisiana State University Agricultural and Mechanical College had its origin in several land grants made by the United States government in 1806, 1811, and 1827 for use as a seminary of learning. It was founded as a military academy and is still today steeped in military tradition, giving rise to the school's nickname "The Ole War Skule". In 1853, the Louisiana General Assembly established the Seminary of Learning of the State of Louisiana near Pineville in Rapides Parish in Central Louisiana. Modeled initially after Virginia Military Institute, the institution opened with five professors and nineteen cadets on January 2, 1860, with Major, later Colonel, William Tecumseh Sherman as superintendent.

The Old LSU Site, the school's original location, is listed on the National Register of Historic Places.

On January 26, 1861, when Louisiana became the fifth state to secede from the Union, Sherman resigned his position after only a year as Superintendent to return north and eventually resume his service in the Union Army. The school closed on June 30, 1861, after the start of the American Civil War.

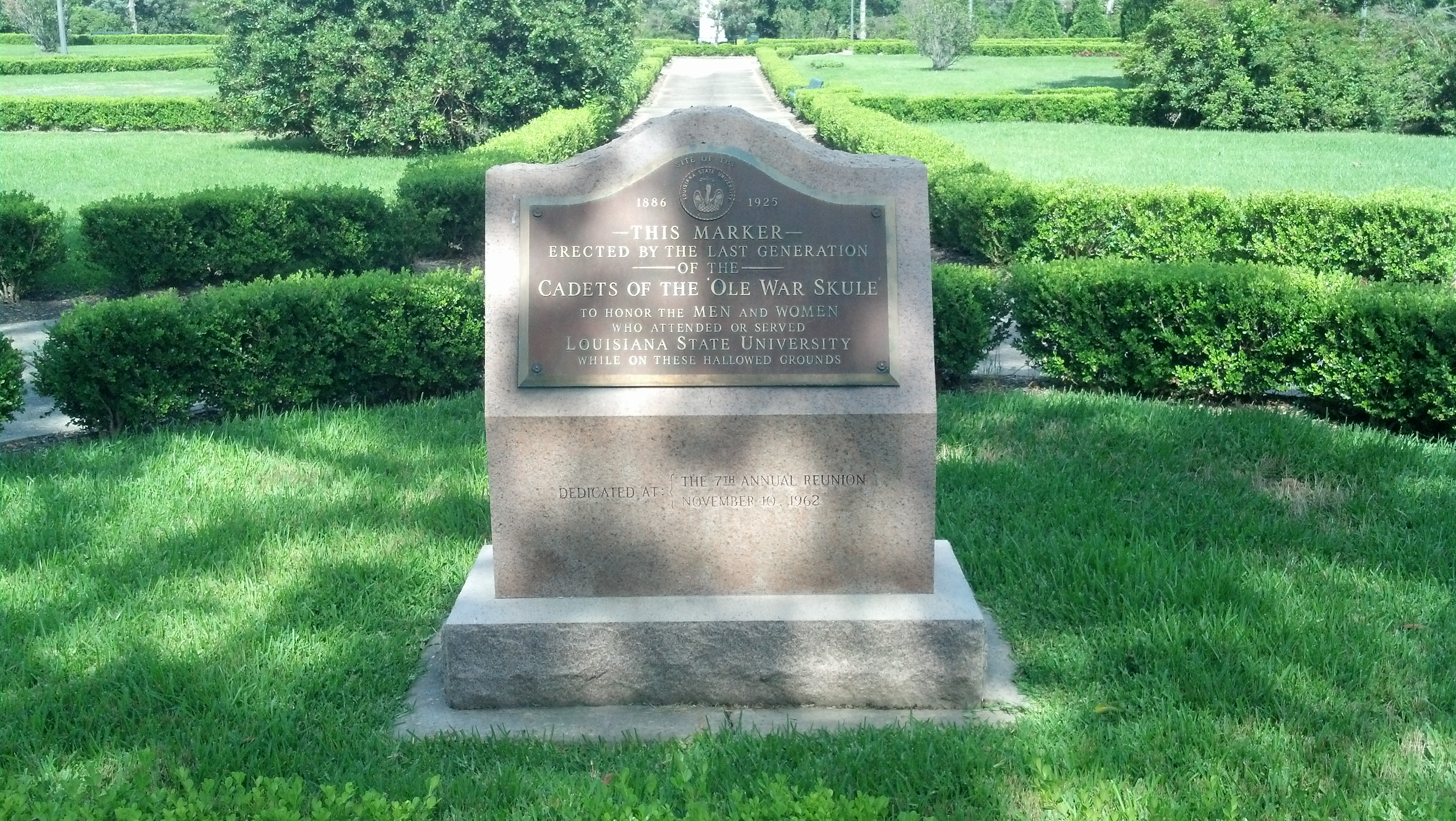
Downtown Baton Rouge Campus (1886–1925) Historical Marker

During the war, the university reopened briefly in April 1863 but was closed once again during the Union Army's Red River Campaign. The losses sustained by the institution during the Union occupation were heavy, and after 1863 the seminary remained closed for the remainder of the Civil War. Following the surrender of the Confederates at Appomattox Court House on April 9, 1865, General Sherman donated two cannons to the institution. These cannons had been captured from Confederate forces after the close of the war and had been used during the initial firing upon Fort Sumter in April 1861. The cannons are still displayed in front of LSU's Military Science/Aerospace Studies Building.

The seminary officially reopened its doors on October 2, 1865, only to be burned October 15, 1869. On November 1, 1869, the institution resumed its exercises in Baton Rouge, where it has since remained. In 1870, the name of the institution was officially changed to Louisiana State University.

Louisiana State University Agricultural and Mechanical College was established by an act of the legislature, approved April 7, 1874, to carry out the United States Morrill Act of 1862, granting lands for this purpose. It temporarily opened in New Orleans, June 1, 1874, where it remained until it merged with Louisiana State University in 1877. This prompted the final name change for the university to the Louisiana State University and Agricultural and Mechanical College.

=== 20th century ===
Louisiana State University Memorial Tower

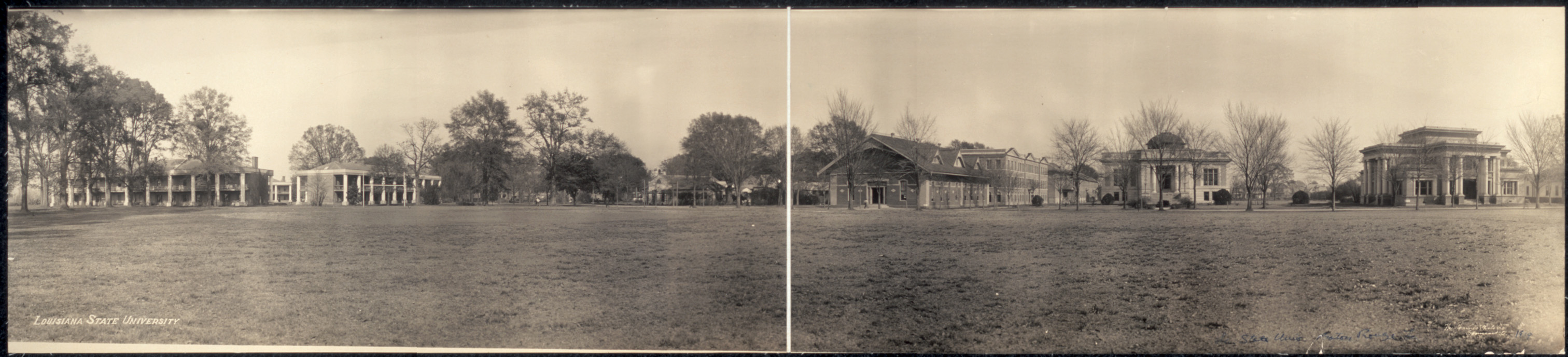
A panorama of the LSU campus in 1909

In 1905, LSU admitted its first female student, R. O. Davis. She was admitted into a program to pursue a master's degree. The following year, 1906, LSU admitted sixteen female students to its freshman class as part of an experimental program. Before this, LSU's student body was all-male. In 1907, LSU's first female graduate, Martha McC. Read, was awarded a Bachelor of Arts degree. After this two year experimental program, the university fully opened its doors to female applicants in 1908, and thus coeducation was born at LSU.

On April 30, 1926, the present LSU campus was formally dedicated, following the school's history at the federal garrison grounds (now the site of the state capitol) where it had been since 1886. Before this, LSU used the quarters of the Institute for the Deaf, Mute, and Blind. Land for the present campus was purchased in 1918, construction started in 1922, and the move began in 1925; however, the move was not completed until 1932. The campus was originally designed for 3000 students but was cut back due to budget problems. After years of enrollment fluctuation, student numbers began a steady increase, new programs were added, curricula and faculty expanded, and a true state university emerged.

In 1936, LSU awarded its first Ph.D. in any subject to a woman, Harriett Ruth Idol. Dr. Idol was in the Speech Department (today's Department of Communication Studies) and her dissertation was titled "A Strobophotographic Study of Southern Intonation." Dr. Idol's landmark study was one of the earliest experimental, instrument-based attempts to map the specific speech patterns, melodies, and pitch variations that define the American Southern accent.

LSU was hit by scandal in 1939 when James Monroe Smith, appointed by Huey Long as president of LSU, was charged with embezzling a half-million dollars. In the ensuing investigation, at least twenty state officials were indicted. Two committed suicide as the scandal enveloped Governor Richard W. Leche, who received a 10-year federal prison sentence as a result of a kickback scheme. Paul M. Hebert, Dean of LSU's law school at the time, then assumed interim presidency in Smith's place.

During World War II, LSU was one of 131 colleges and universities nationally that took part in the V-12 Navy College Training Program which offered students a path to a Navy commission.

In 1952, Charles Edward Harrington became the first African American to earn a degree at any level from LSU (master's degree in education).

The following year (1953), LSU admitted its first Black undergraduate student, Alexander P. Tureaud Jr., however, he was not allowed to finish his first semester.

In 1954, Ernest N. Morial became the first African American graduate from the LSU Law School.

In 1959, Floyd L. Sandle was the first African-American to receive a Ph.D. at LSU in any subject. Dr. Sandle was a member of the Speech Department (today's Department of Communication Studies) and his dissertation was titled "A History of the Development of the Educational Theatre In Negro Colleges and Universities and Its Relationship to Significant Movements In Community Relations From 1911-1959." Dr. Sandle was "a pioneer of Black Educational Theatre in Louisiana" and is still a major influence on Black performing artists today.

In 1964, six Black students were allowed to enroll as undergraduates, and Freya Anderson Rivers became the first African-American woman undergraduate.

In 1967, Pinkie Gordon Lane became the first African-American woman to earn a Ph.D. degree.

In 1969, mandatory ROTC for freshmen and sophomores was abolished; however, LSU continues to maintain Air Force and Army ROTC.

In 1978, LSU was named a sea-grant college, the 13th university in the nation to be so designated. In 1992, the LSU Board of Supervisors approved the creation of the LSU Honors College.

In 1970, Claude Jenkins Tellis became the first African American to earn a Doctor of Medicine (MD) degree from the LSU School of Medicine in New Orleans.

In 1971, Dolores Richard Spikes became the first African-American woman to earn a Ph.D. in mathematics.

=== 21st century ===
After Hurricane Katrina, LSU accepted 2,300 displaced students from schools in the greater New Orleans area such as Tulane University, Loyola University New Orleans, Xavier University of Louisiana, and the University of New Orleans. The Pete Maravich Assembly Center was converted into a fully functional field hospital, with approximately 3,000 student volunteers.

In 2012, LSU was censured by the American Association of University Professors for firing Professor Ivor van Heerden after he made comments critical of the U.S. Army Corps of Engineers for their design and construction of the levees that broke following Hurricane Katrina.

In 2013, F. King Alexander was named President of Louisiana State University.

In 2016, Michelle Lollie became the first African-American woman to graduate with a PhD in physics from LSU.

In fall 2020, LSU broke its record for the most diverse and largest freshman class in history. Of the record 6,690 freshmen, more than 30% identified as students of color, African-Americans made up the most at 16.8%. Additionally, LSU reached its all-time highest enrollment at 34,290 undergraduate and graduate students.

William F. Tate IV was named the new president of the university on May 6, 2021, effective in July. He is the first African-American president in LSU's history and the first African-American president in the SEC.

==== Sexual misconduct controversies ====
A November 2020 investigative report in USA Today accused LSU of mishandling sexual misconduct claims against LSU football players. LSU hired Husch Blackwell LLP to review policies in response to the report. Husch Blackwell released a 262-page report in March 2021 confirming the USA Today story, adding that the problems within LSU went far beyond the allegations detailed in the investigation, with many of the problems being widespread across the university. In the fallout of the report, former LSU Tigers football coach Les Miles and former LSU president F. King Alexander were forced to resign from their jobs at the University of Kansas and Oregon State University, respectively.

In February 2021, the US Department of Education announced a formal, federal investigation will be conducted on the university's reported mishandling of sexual misconduct cases; specifically on possible violations of the Clery Act. In April 2021, the Department of Education announced the opening of a second federal investigation where LSU's handling of student complaints of sexual assault and harassment from the 2018–2019 academic year to the present will be analyzed.

Two months later, seven women filed a federal class-action lawsuit against LSU and its leadership based on their inability to report their incidents to the university's Title IX office. The seven women were six former students (three of whom were part of the women's tennis team at LSU and two of whom were student employees in the football recruiting office) and one current student. In June 2021, football coach Ed Orgeron was added as a defendant to the Title IX lawsuit, alleging that Orgeron was aware of and failed to report the rape allegation of former running back Derrius Guice.

LSU's Assistant Athletic Director of Football Recruiting and Alumni Relations, Sharon Lewis, also filed a $50 million federal lawsuit against the university for years of harassment for her attempts to report sexual misconduct allegations against players, coaches, and athletic officials. In January 2022, Lewis' legal team alleged that the university had violated Louisiana's whistleblower law, Equal Employment Opportunity Commission guidelines, and Title IX as Lewis was fired in retaliation for her lawsuit. In July 2022, the trial date for Lewis' lawsuit was scheduled for May 22, 2023, while the joint lawsuit filed by the LSU students was scheduled for June 26, 2023. In December 2023, a federal jury dismissed all the claims in Lewis' lawsuit.

In October 2023, as a result of federal lawsuit linked to LSU's tennis program, a judge sanctioned the university due to the data of university-issued phones that once belonged to former tennis coaches, Julia and Michael Sell, being deleted after they left the school. Both coaches were accused of failing to act on reports of sexual assaults they received from students which were communicated electronically.

==== Corporate influence on research controversy ====
An April 2024 investigative report co-published in The Guardian and The Lens, a non-profit newsroom in New Orleans, found that LSU gave corporations robust powers to review and influence academic research and coursework at the university in exchange for donations. Records show that the university granted Shell a seat on the board of the LSU Institute for Energy Innovation, including the right to vote on the Institute's research activities and to review study output, following a donation by Shell of $25 million in 2022, and that LSU's fundraising arm, the LSU Foundation, circulated a boilerplate document offering similar privileges to other companies in exchange for a $5 million investment in the Institute. The university also offered "strategic partner"-level privileges, which included voting rights on research activities at the Institute, in exchange for at least a $1.25 million investment, with ExxonMobil becoming the Institute's first "strategic partner"-level donor and at least eight other companies having discussed similar deals with LSU, according to a "Partnership Update" that LSU sent to ExxonMobil in August 2023. Records also show that a representative from Shell helped to shape the curriculum of the six courses under the Institute's Carbon Capture, Use, and Storage concentration, as well as representatives from BP, Chevron, ConocoPhillips, and ExxonMobil.

Former LSU journalism professor Robert Mann labeled the ability of oil companies to vote on research agendas "an egregious violation of academic freedom," and Jane Patton, an LSU alumna and US Fossil Economy Campaign Manager at the Center for International Environmental Law, referred to the practice as "a gross misuse of the public trust." In response, Brad Ives, the director of LSU Institute for Energy Innovation, defended the partnerships, characterized the claim that "having corporate funding for research damages the integrity of that research" as being "a little far-fetched", and argued that what the institute is doing is no different from similar institutes across the US.

== Campus ==
Foster Hall, as seen from LSU Library

LSU historical enrollment
Year	Pop.	±%
1860	19	—
1861	73	+284.2%
1928	1,800	+2365.8%
1936	6,000	+233.3%
2002	31,582	+426.4%
2003	31,234	−1.1%
2004	31,561	+1.0%
2005	33,264	+5.4%
2015	31,527	−5.2%
2017	30,863	−2.1%
2019	31,761	+2.9%
2020	34,290	+8.0%

The LSU campus sits on 1,000 acres (8.1 km^{2}) just south of downtown Baton Rouge. Most of the university's 250 buildings, most of which were built between 1925 and 1940, occupy a 650-acre (2.6 km^{2}) plateau on the banks of the Mississippi River. Campus buildings adhere to an overall design emphasizing use of stucco on walls beneath roofs of Ludowici tile.

Theodore C. Link collaborated with Wilbur Trueblood on the project but remained faithful to the campus the Olmsted firm had designed. Unfortunately, Link died in 1923 before the plan was completed. New Orleans architects Wogan and Bernard completed Link's work and the campus was dedicated on April 30, 1926.

Under Huey Long, the governor from 1928 to 1932, LSU "more than doubled its enrollment despite the Great Depression; its standing had risen to Grade A; dormitories and buildings for departments of music, dramatic arts, and physical education had been completed; other buildings were soon to start, and costs of attendance had been lowered within the reach of many."

Nine LSU buildings, including the library and the academic buildings for dairying and physics, were constructed by George A. Caldwell, a native of Abbeville. Caldwell designed twenty-six public buildings in Louisiana.

The campus is known for the 1,200 live oak trees that shade the ground of the university.

=== Historic district ===
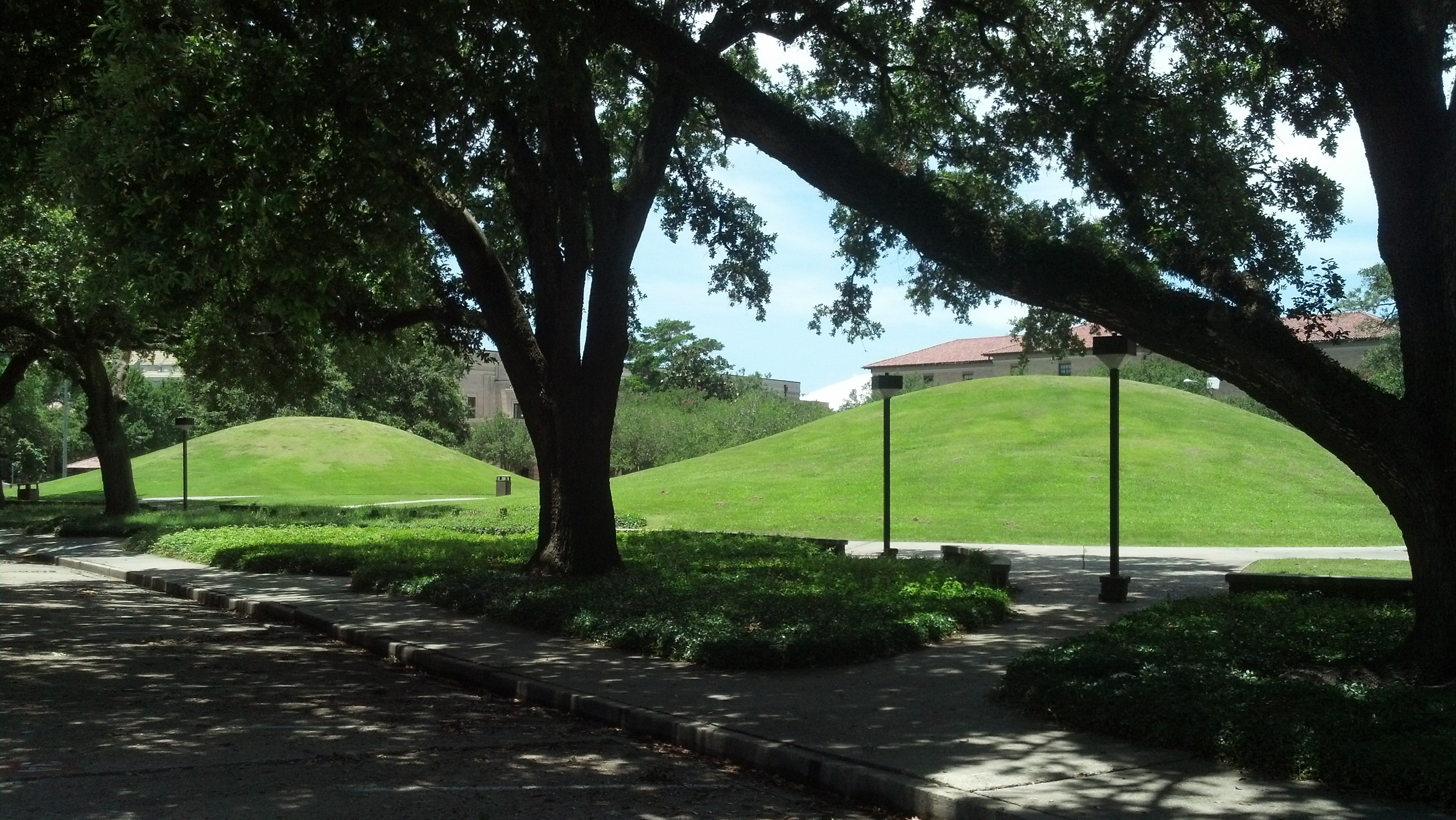
The LSU Campus Mounds are estimated to be over 5,000 years old.

Fifty-seven resources on the LSU campus were listed in the 95 acres (38 ha) Louisiana State University Historic District on the National Register of Historic Places on September 15, 1988. Forty-six of the enlisted resources were considered contributing buildings and structures. The campus is protected by the State Capital Historic District Legislation.

The LSU Campus Mounds, which are part of a larger mound group spread throughout the state, are near the northwestern corner of the campus and were built an estimated 5,000 years ago. They were individually enlisted in the National Register of Historic Places on March 1, 1999.

=== Campus housing ===
On-campus housing options include on-campus apartments (East Campus Apartments, West Campus Apartments, and Nicholson Gateway Apartments), Annie Boyd Hall, Evangeline Hall, the Agricultural Residence College, the Engineering Residential College, the Business Residential College, Broussard, Acadian, Beauregard, Blake, Cypress, Herget, Highland, Jackson, LeJeune, McVoy, Miller, Taylor, East Laville, and West Laville.

=== Museums ===
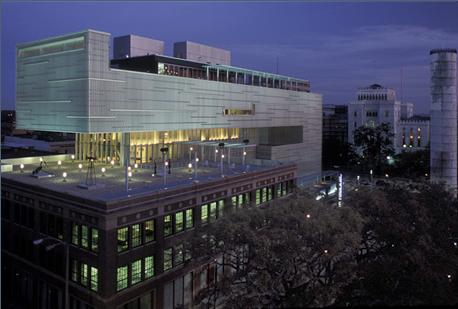
The Shaw Center for the Arts houses the LSU Museum of Art.

The LSU Museum of Art shares the Shaw Center for the Arts with many cultural partners including the LSU School of Art Gallery, LSU's Laboratory for Creative Arts and Technology, the Manship Theatre, and the Community School for the Arts of the Arts Council of Greater Baton Rouge. There is also the LSU Museum of Natural Science, LSU Rural Life Museum, and the Louisiana Museum of Natural History. The LSU Textile & Costume Museum, located in the Human Ecology Building, houses more than 7,000 examples of historic dress and textiles dating from the eighteenth century to the present day.

=== Other campuses ===
Other Louisiana State University campuses include the LSU Agricultural Center, Pennington Biomedical Research Center, LSU of Alexandria, LSU Shreveport, LSU Eunice, LSU Health Sciences Center New Orleans and LSU Health Sciences Center Shreveport.

The University of New Orleans was a member of Louisiana State University from 1958 until 1963 as LSUNO and under its own name from 1974 until 2011, when it was transferred to the University of Louisiana System by the Louisiana Legislature. Starting in 2026, it will rejoin the Louisiana State University System.

LSU owns and operates the J. Bennett Johnston Sr. Center for Advanced Microstructures and Devices (CAMD), which is a 1.3 GeV synchrotron radiation facility.

== Academics ==
=== Undergraduate admissions ===
Undergraduate admissions statistics
- 2021 entering class
- Admit rate: 70.9% (▼ −5.5)
- Yield rate: 27.2% (▼ −12.4)

Test scores middle 50%
- SAT Total: 1130–1300
- ACT Composite: 23–29

The 2022 annual ranking of U.S. News & World Report categorizes LSU-Baton Rouge as "more selective". For the Class of 2025 (enrolled fall 2021), LSU received 36,561 applications and accepted 25,907 (70.9%). Of those accepted, 7,045 enrolled, a yield rate (the percentage of accepted students who choose to attend the university) of 27.2%. LSU's freshman retention rate is 82.9%, with 69% going on to graduate within six years.

The enrolled first-year class of 2025 had the following standardized test scores: the middle 50% range (25th percentile-75th percentile) of SAT scores was 1130–1300, while the middle 50% range of ACT scores was 23–29.

Fall first-time freshman statistics
	2021	2020	2019	2018	2017	2016
Applicants	36,561	28,960	24,501	24,280	17,907	18,122
Admits	25,907	21,252	18,272	18,024	13,236	13,843
Admit rate	70.9	73.4	74.6	74.2	73.9	76.4
Enrolled	7,045	6,701	6,132	5,812	4,917	5,475
Yield rate	27.2	31.5	33.6	32.2	37.1	39.6
ACT composite* (out of 36)	23–29	23–28	23–29	23–29	23–28	23–28
SAT composite* (out of 1600)	1130–1300	1080–1280	1090–1280	1070–1290	1060–1290	—
* middle 50% range

=== Colleges and schools ===
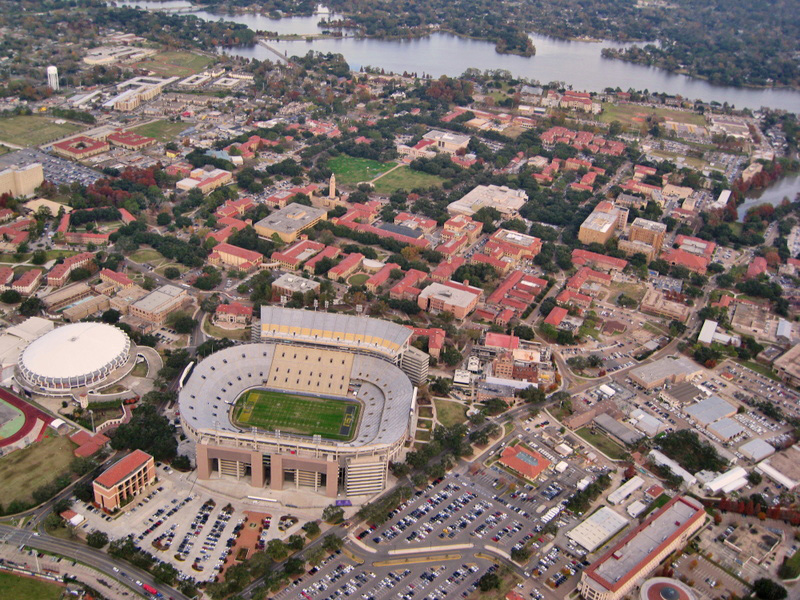
LSU's campus with Tiger Stadium and the PMAC in the foreground

- College of Agriculture
- College of Art & Design
- College of Humanities & Social Sciences
- College of Science
- E. J. Ourso College of Business
- College of Music & Dramatic Arts
- College of Human Sciences & Education
- College of Engineering
- Paul M. Hebert Law Center
- University College
- Roger Hadfield Ogden Honors College
- Pinkie Gordon Lane Graduate School
- Manship School of Mass Communication
- School of Information Studies
- School of Veterinary Medicine
- College of the Coast & Environment
- School of Social Work
- Continuing Education

=== Laboratory school ===
The university operates the Louisiana State University Laboratory School, a kindergarten through 12 public school.

=== Farm ===
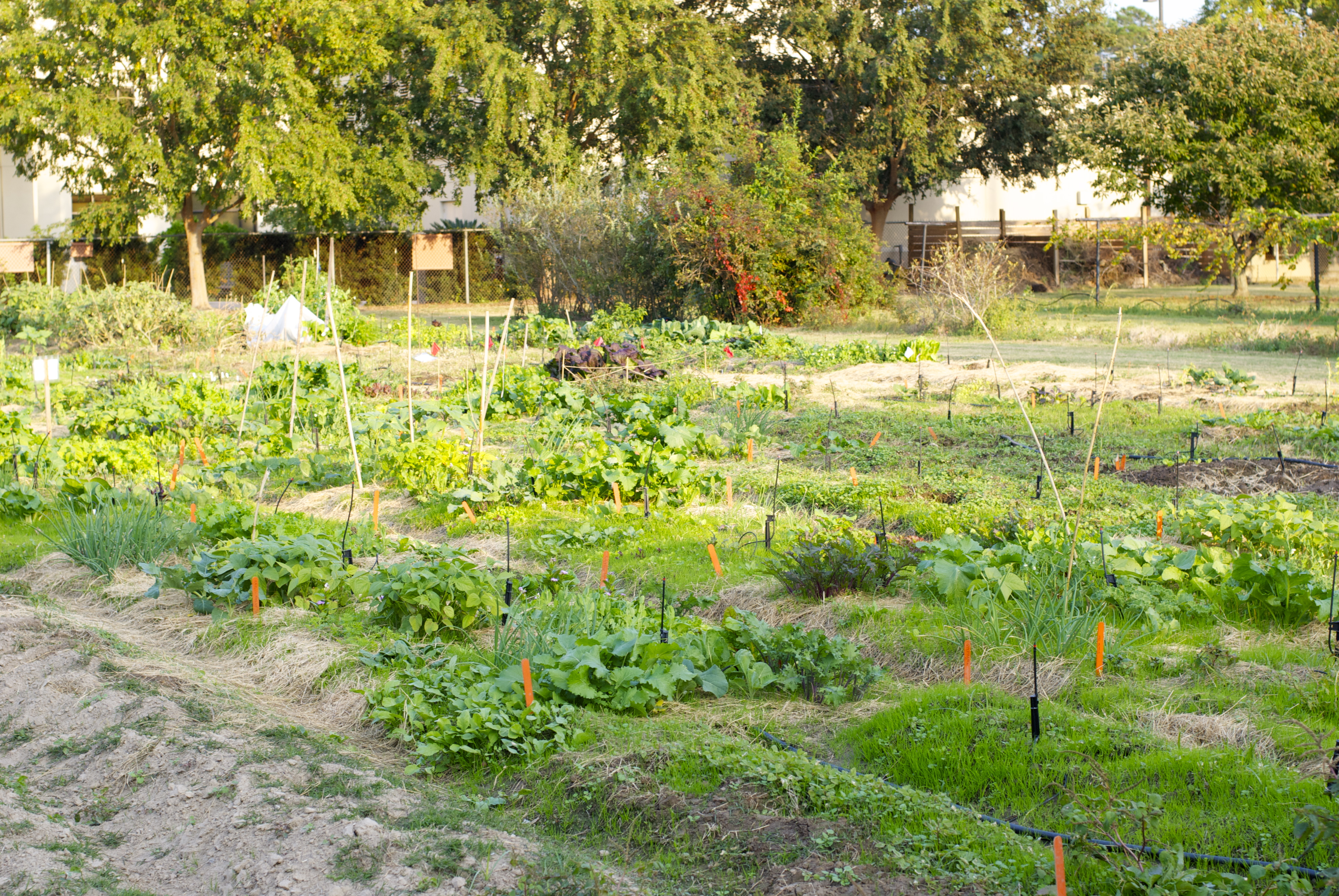
Hill Farm Community Garden

Hill Farm established in 1927 by the Louisiana Agricultural Experiment Station in order to carry out research horticultural crops as part of Louisiana State University's mission as a land-grant university.

During the 1960s a large part of the Farm's land was reallocated for the construction of sorority houses, as a result, many of the fruit breeding programs had to be moved to other parts of the state. In the 1990s a new student recreation center and playing fields were created on the site of most of the remaining land, the remaining research programs were moved to the Burden Research Plantation. Today five acres of the original Hill Farm remain and used primarily as an agriculture teaching facility and community garden. Individual garden plots are nine by five feet (9' × 5') and may be rented by students, faculty, and the community at large. The price per lot has been deliberately kept low to support the Farm's mission to "provide access to gardening space, education, and resources necessary for the community to grow food in environmentally sustainable ways as a means of creating a food system where locally produced, affordable and nutritious food is available to all, and where the community can come together to share, play, and inspire one another." Although the gardeners are not required to plant certified organic seeds and plants, the Farm requires gardeners to use organic farming methods.

=== Reputation and rankings ===
Academic rankings

National
- Forbes: 124
- U.S. News & World Report: 169 (tie)
- Washington Monthly: 170
- WSJ/College Pulse: 199

Global
- ARWU: 401–500
- QS: 851-900
- THE: 601–800
- U.S. News & World Report: 385 (tie)

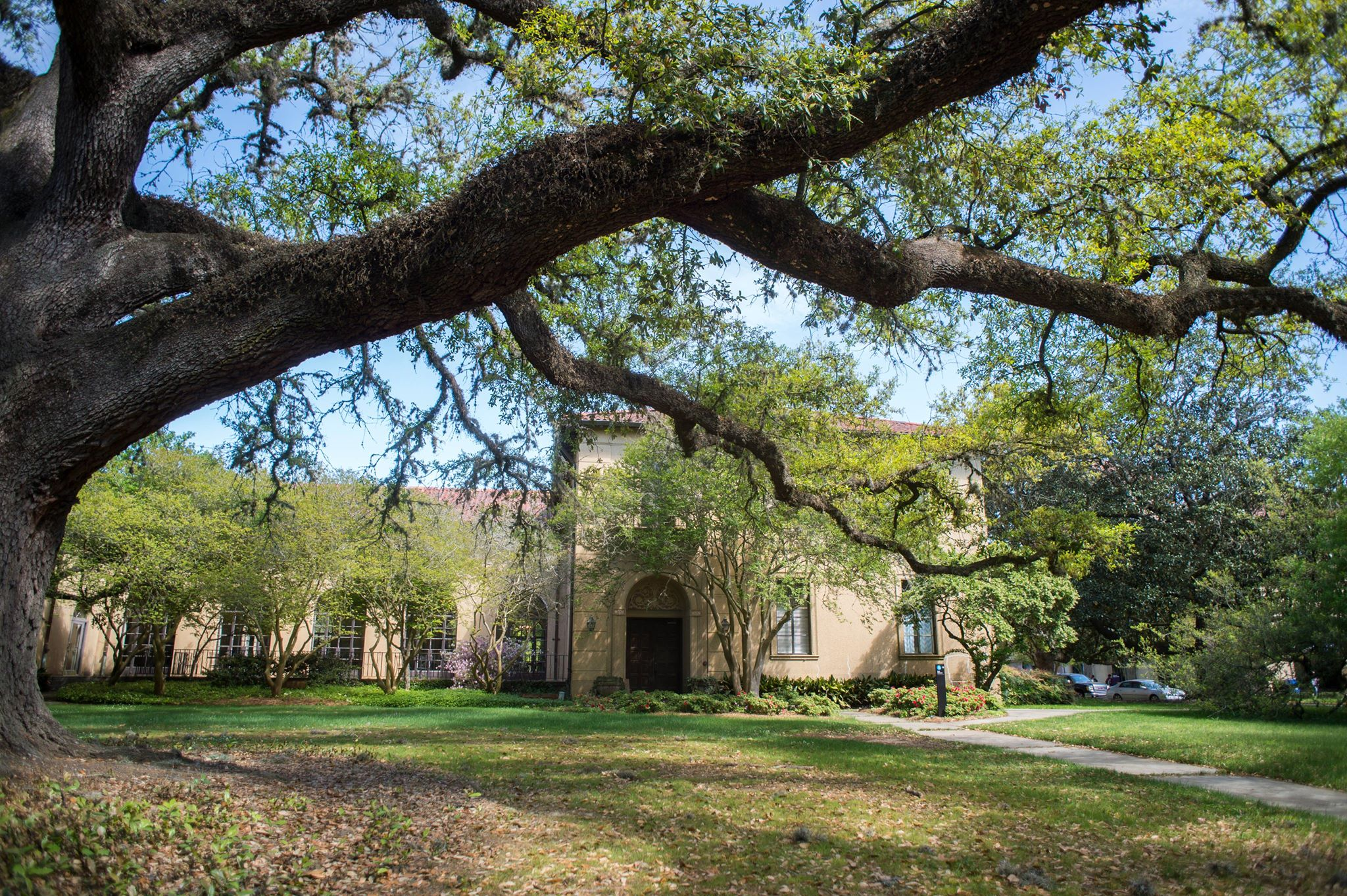
The LSU Faculty Club in March 2018

Louisiana State University is ranked 185th in the national universities category and 101st among public universities by the 2023 U.S. News & World Report ranking of U.S. colleges. LSU is also ranked as the 192nd best overall university in the nation by Forbes magazine in 2019. In 2009, U.S. News & World Report ranked LSU as the 16th most popular university in the nation among high school students.

=== Libraries ===
The library, viewed from the LSU quad

LSU's main library collection, numbering almost three million volumes, is housed in the Library on the main quadrangle of the university. It is both a general use library and a U.S. Regional Federal Depository Library, housing publications from the federal government, United Nations, and United States Patent and Trademark Office. The LSU Libraries belong to the Association of Research Libraries, which includes the top 127 academic libraries in the U.S. and Canada; the Association of Southeastern Research Libraries (ASERL); Lyrasis; and the Louisiana Academic Library Information Network Consortium (LALINC). LSU was among the founding members of LOUIS: The Louisiana Library Network, which provides access to most academic library catalogs in the state.

Its collections of rare books, dating back to the fifteenth century, number more than 80,000 volumes and include the E. A. McIlhenny Natural History Collection, which contains many important works in the history of ornithological and botanical illustration, including John James Audubon's Birds of America, Margaret Stones's Flora of Louisiana, and books by Edward Lear, John Gould, Mark Catesby, and Sir Joseph Banks.

Ella V. Aldrich Schwing was librarian at LSU, a member of the faculty of the LSU Library School, and a member of the LSU Board of Supervisors. She donated funds for an annual lecture titled the LSU Libraries Schwing Lecture Series, which began in 1965. Lecturers included Martha Boaz, Ching-chih Chen, John Y. Cole, Richard M. Dougherty, Edward G. Holley, Judith Krug, Clifford Lynch, James G. Neal, Carl Howard Pforzheimer Jr, Benjamin E. Powell and Robert Wedgeworth.

In June 2020, the LSU Board of Supervisors adopted a resolution to remove Troy H. Middleton's name from the university's main library. The decision came amid student protests concerning the racist past of former LSU President Troy H. Middleton, after whom the Library was named. Louisiana Governor John Bel Edwards supported the decision, stating that "[Black] LSU students shouldn't be asked to study in a library bearing the name of someone who didn't want them to be LSU students."

The unnamed LSU Main Library is prominently in disrepair and is under consideration to be demolished. The library's upper floors collections are covered with a plastic tarp to prevent ceiling leaks from damaging books and the basement is prone to flooding.

=== Publications ===
- LSU Press is a nonprofit book publisher dedicated to the publication of scholarly, general interest, and regional books. It publishes approximately 80 titles per year and continues to garner national and international accolades, including four Pulitzer Prizes. John Kennedy Toole's A Confederacy of Dunces is among its best-known publications.
- Southern Review is a literary journal published by LSU. It was co-founded in 1935 by three-time Pulitzer Prize-winning writer Robert Penn Warren, who served as U.S. Poet Laureate and wrote the classic novel All the King's Men, and renowned literary critic of the New Criticism school, Cleanth Brooks. It publishes fiction, poetry, and essays, with an emphasis on southern culture and history.
- Legacy is a student-run magazine that publishes a variety of feature-length stories. In both 2001 and 2005, it was named the best student magazine in the nation by the Society of Professional Journalists.
- LSU RESEARCH magazine informs readers about university research programs.
- Apollo's Lyre is a poetry and fiction magazine published each semester by the Honors College.
- LSU Alumni Magazine is a quarterly which focuses on Alumni success and current university news sent out to alumni everywhere.
- Gumbo is the university's yearbook, which may be purchased.
- LSU Today magazine keeps faculty and staff updated with university news.
- New Delta Review is a literary quarterly funded by LSU that publishes a wide range of fiction, poetry, and interviews from new, up-and-coming, and established writers.

== Student life ==
Undergraduate demographics as of Fall 2023
Race and ethnicity	Total
White	61%
Black	19%
Hispanic	10%
Asian	5%
Two or more races	3%
International student	1%
Unknown	1%
Economic diversity
Low-income (Note: The percentage of students who received an income-based federal Pell grant intended for low-income students.)	28%
Affluent (Note: The percentage of students who are a part of the American middle class at the bare minimum.)	72%

=== Organizations ===
LSU Student Union

There are over 350 student organizations currently active at LSU, including a student government and a total of 36 fraternities and sororities. The LSU Corps of Cadets is one of the oldest student organizations on campus. LSU also has an active Society of American Archivists student chapter.

Much like the United States Government, the LSU Student Government is divided into three major branches; Executive, Legislative, and Judicial. LSU SG is headed by the student body president and the student body vice president, elected to office during the spring semester of each academic year. A College Council system is also established to designate members of SG to the duties of representing specific academic colleges. Additionally, a Student Union Board representative is elected each spring to represent student interests and oversee programs, events, and regulations of the LSU Student Union.

=== Media ===
The Reveille, the university's student newspaper, has operated since 1887. Princeton Review named the Daily Reveille as the 12th best college newspaper in the nation in its 2008 edition of The Best 361 Colleges. The Daily Reveille won the Editor & Publisher award, or EPpy, in 2008 for best college newspaper Web site. The Society of Professional Journalists named the Reveille "Best All-Around Daily Student Newspaper" in its 2012 Mark of Excellence awards.

KLSU is an FCC-licensed non-commercial educational (NCE) college radio station run by LSU students.

Broadcasting on campus cable channel 75, Tiger TV is a student-run television show, sharing its production equipment and facilities with the Manship School of Mass Communication.

=== Greek life ===
In 2019, 16% of undergraduate men and 27% of undergraduate women were active in LSU's Greek system.

== Athletics ==
LSU fields teams in 21 varsity sports (9 men's, 12 women's), and is a member of the NCAA (National Collegiate Athletic Association) and the Southeastern Conference.

The nine men's teams compete in baseball, basketball, cross country, football, golf, swimming and diving, tennis, indoor track and field, and outdoor track and field. The 12 women's teams compete in basketball, beach volleyball, cross country, golf, gymnastics, soccer, softball, swimming and diving, tennis, indoor track and field, outdoor track and field, and volleyball.

The athletics department official nickname is Fighting Tigers, Tigers, or Lady Tigers.

=== National championships ===
LSU has won 53 team national championships (most in the SEC), 48 of which were bestowed by the NCAA, tying for ninth all-time in total NCAA team national championships. The four football titles were not conferred by the NCAA, as it does not award college football national championships at the Division I-FBS level.

- Baseball (8): 1991, 1993, 1996, 1997, 2000, 2009, 2023, 2025
- Women's basketball (1): 2023
- Men's basketball (1): 1935 (pre-NCAA; defeated Pittsburgh in an arranged game)
- Boxing (1): 1949
- Football (4): 1958, 2003, 2007, 2019
- Men's golf (5): 1940, 1942, 1947, 1955, 2015
- Men's indoor track and field (2): 2001, 2004
- Women's indoor track and field (11): 1987, 1989, 1991, 1993, 1994, 1995, 1996, 1997, 2002, 2003, 2004
- Men's outdoor track and field (5): 1933, 1989, 1990, 2002, 2021
- Women's outdoor track and field (14): 1987, 1988, 1989, 1990, 1991, 1992, 1993, 1994, 1995, 1996, 1997, 2000, 2003, 2008, 2012 (vacated)
- Women's gymnastics (1): 2024

=== Facilities ===
LSU's stadiums, arenas and courses include Tiger Stadium ("Death Valley") (football), Alex Box Stadium, Skip Bertman Field (baseball), Bernie Moore Track Stadium (outdoor track), Carl Maddox Field House (indoor track), Highland Road Park (cross country), LSU Natatorium (swimming and diving), LSU Soccer Stadium (soccer), LSU Tennis Complex (tennis), Pete Maravich Assembly Center (PMAC) (basketball, gymnastics, volleyball), Tiger Park (softball) and University Club of Baton Rouge (golf).

LSU's academic center and practice facilities include the LSU Academic Center for Student-Athletes, Charles McClendon Practice Facility (football), LSU Football Operations Center (football), LSU Indoor Practice Facility (football), LSU Basketball Practice Facility (basketball) and LSU Gymnastics Training Facility (gymnastics).

Tiger Stadium

Tiger Stadium

Although originally nicknamed "Deaf Valley" for its excruciating levels of sound, the nickname "Death Valley" caught on instead. It is legendary for the crowd noise generated by fans. It is the sixth-largest college football stadium in the nation and third-largest stadium in the SEC, holding 102,321 fans after its latest expansion in 2014. The Tiger Stadium atmosphere is generally considered one of the loudest and most electrifying college football experiences in the country. During a nationally televised game against Auburn in 2003, ESPN recorded a noise level of 117 decibels at certain points in the game. In 2007 when the No. 1 ranked Tigers played the No. 9 ranked Florida Gators, the noise level registered at 122 decibels when the Tigers made a come-from-behind win in the final minutes of the game.

A similar sound level resulted in the legendary "Earthquake Game" against Auburn in 1988. LSU won 7–6 when quarterback Tommy Hodson completed a game-winning touchdown pass to running back Eddie Fuller in the waning seconds of the game. The crowd's roar registered on a seismograph, shaking the ground as much as a small earthquake.

=== Rivals ===
Rivals include the traditional intra-SEC West rivals the Alabama Crimson Tide, Arkansas Razorbacks, Auburn Tigers, Mississippi State Bulldogs, Ole Miss Rebels, and the SEC East rival Florida Gators (designated under the SEC's inter-division "designated rival" format). LSU and Arkansas play annually in football, alternating sites between Baton Rouge and Fayetteville (Little Rock from 1994 through 2010). The winner of the game is awarded the "Golden Boot", a gold-plated trophy formed in the shape of the two states. The game was played the Friday after Thanksgiving in 1992, and every year between 1996 and 2013, except 2009, but starting in 2014, the SEC separated LSU and Arkansas on the final weekend of the regular season. The Tigers now play Texas A&M on the final weekend of the regular season, while Arkansas plays Missouri.

LSU and in-state rival Tulane Green Wave battle for the "Tiger Rag", a flag divided evenly between the colors of the two schools. This rivalry was recently suspended after a payout from LSU.

The LSU-Ole Miss game, known as the Magnolia Bowl (a name selected by the student bodies of both schools) has become more formalized over the years, with a large trophy and a large traveling fanbase for both teams present each year.

The LSU-Florida rivalry also has major importance as the two schools won three football national championships between 2006 and 2008 (Florida in 2006 and 2008; LSU in 2007). It will not be played in 2027 and 2029 due to SEC expansion.

The LSU-Alabama rivalry was very important in recent years due to the Nick Saban becoming the coach of Alabama and the two teams' dominance of the SEC's West Division and their matchup in the 2012 BCS National Championship Game (the only time the standalone game featured two teams from the same conference).

== Traditions ==
=== Mascot ===
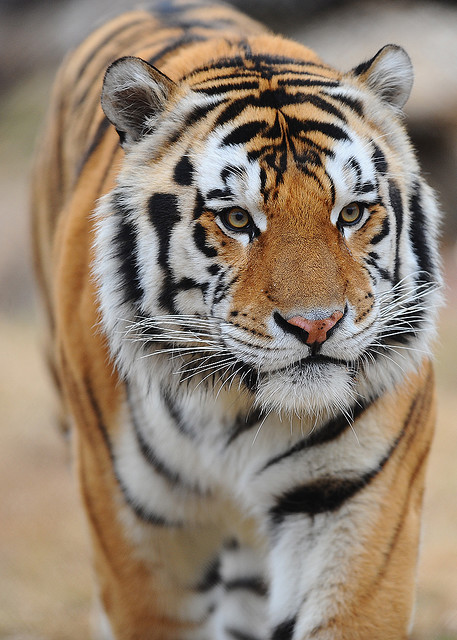
Mike the Tiger is LSU's official mascot.

LSU Athletics is represented by its mascot, a live Bengal tiger named "Mike the Tiger". LSU is only one of two institutions of higher education in the United States to have a live tiger as their mascot; the other is the University of Memphis. The tiger was named after Mike Chambers, LSU's athletic trainer in 1936, and was bought for $750 from the Little Rock Arkansas Zoo. Mike V reigned from 1990 to 2007 and remained housed in his on-campus habitat until his death due to kidney failure on May 18, 2007, at age 17. Mike VI was an 11-year-old, 500-pound (230 kg) tiger acquired from an Indiana big cat sanctuary. Previously known as Roscoe, "Mike VI" is a Bengal-Siberian mix and was officially named Mike on September 8, 2007. He was introduced to fans at the home game against Florida on October 6, 2007. In 2017, LSU officially introduced Mike VII, formerly named "Harvey".

In 2005, a new $3 million Mike the Tiger Habitat was created for Mike between Tiger Stadium and the Pete Maravich Assembly Center. Its amenities include lush plantings, a waterfall, a flowing stream that empties into a wading pond, and rocky plateaus. The habitat has, as a backdrop, an Italianate tower – a campanile – that creates a visual link to the Italianate architectural vernacular of LSU's campus.

=== Alma mater ===
The "LSU Alma Mater" was written in 1929 by Lloyd Funchess and Harris Downey, two students who developed the original song and music because LSU's first alma mater was sung to the tune of "Far Above Cayuga's Waters" and was used by Cornell University. The band plays the "Alma Mater" during pregame and at the end of each home football game.

=== Fight song ===
"Fight for LSU" is LSU's official fight song. During LSU football games, it is played when the team runs onto the field, after the field goal or extra point is attempted/scored and at the end of each half (though at the end of the first half a recording is played since the band is already on the sidelines and unable to perform it live). Contrary to popular belief, the song "Hey Fightin' Tigers" is not LSU's fight song, however, it is a staple at pep rallies and is often sung by fans before games and after wins.

== Notable alumni ==
LSU athletes have gone on to achieve prominence in their respective sports. "Pistol" Pete Maravich played basketball for LSU and was a three-time consensus first-team All-American and 1970 National Player of the Year. Shaquille O'Neal ("Shaq") also played basketball for LSU and received many honors, including being named twice as a first-team Men's Basketball All-American and twice as the SEC Player of the Year. Billy Cannon played Halfback for LSU and was the first LSU player to win the Heisman Trophy (in 1959), the second being Joe Burrow (in 2019). Cannon was inducted into the College Football Hall of Fame in 2009. JaMarcus Russell, Oakland Raiders quarterback number 1 draft pick of 2007. Professional golfer Johnny Pott, five-time winner on the PGA Tour, was a member of the 1955 NCAA winning golf team. Teammates Alex Bregman and Aaron Nola were both 2018 Major League Baseball All-Stars.

LSU alumni have also been active on both the national and international stage in the fields of politics, academia, and the arts. Such notables include Mike Johnson, who has served as Speaker of the United States House of Representatives since October 2023. James Carville, who was the senior political adviser to Bill Clinton, and Donna Brazile, the campaign manager of the 2000 presidential campaign of Vice President Al Gore, both earned bachelor's degrees. Hubert Humphrey, the 38th vice president of the United States, earned a master's degree in political science before becoming the junior United States senator from Minnesota. Linda Thomas-Greenfield, a United States ambassador to the United Nations appointed by President Joe Biden in 2021, earned a BA in 1974. Randy Moffett, president of the University of Louisiana System and former president of Southeastern Louisiana University, received his Ed.D. from LSU in 1980. Academy Award-winning actress Joanne Woodward majored in drama during her enrollment at LSU. Author and screenwriter Nic Pizzolatto, creator of True Detective, graduated from LSU with a BA English & Philosophy. Singer-songwriter, Addison Rae, known for her single Diet Pepsi and collaborations with Charli XCX, also attended the University before moving to Los Angeles after her sophomore year. Queer romance author Casey McQuiston, best known for their best selling novel Red, White & Royal Blue, graduated from LSU with a degree in journalism. Another writer who graduated from LSU was Marcelo Ramos Motta, a noted author on the subject of Thelema. The members of rock band Better Than Ezra also are LSU graduates.

America's early space program benefited from the services of two LSU graduates. Maxime Faget was a Naval reserve officer and the NASA engineer responsible for the design of the Mercury Capsule, Apollo Command Module, Capsule Escape Tower System, Mach Meter, and STS Space Shuttle Orbiter Vehicle and System. NASA pioneer/founder Walter C. Williams established what is now known as NASA's Dryden Flight Research Center, previously known as Muroc Army Station. Williams was directly involved with the Bell X-1 program, "Glamorous Glennis", research flights that led to the first crewed flight exceeding the speed of sound in level flight. Williams was on the Aeronautical Board of NACA and was responsible for hiring many of the pioneers of what is now NASA. Michael I. Jordan, Professor of Computer Science at UC Berkeley, is also an LSU alumnus.

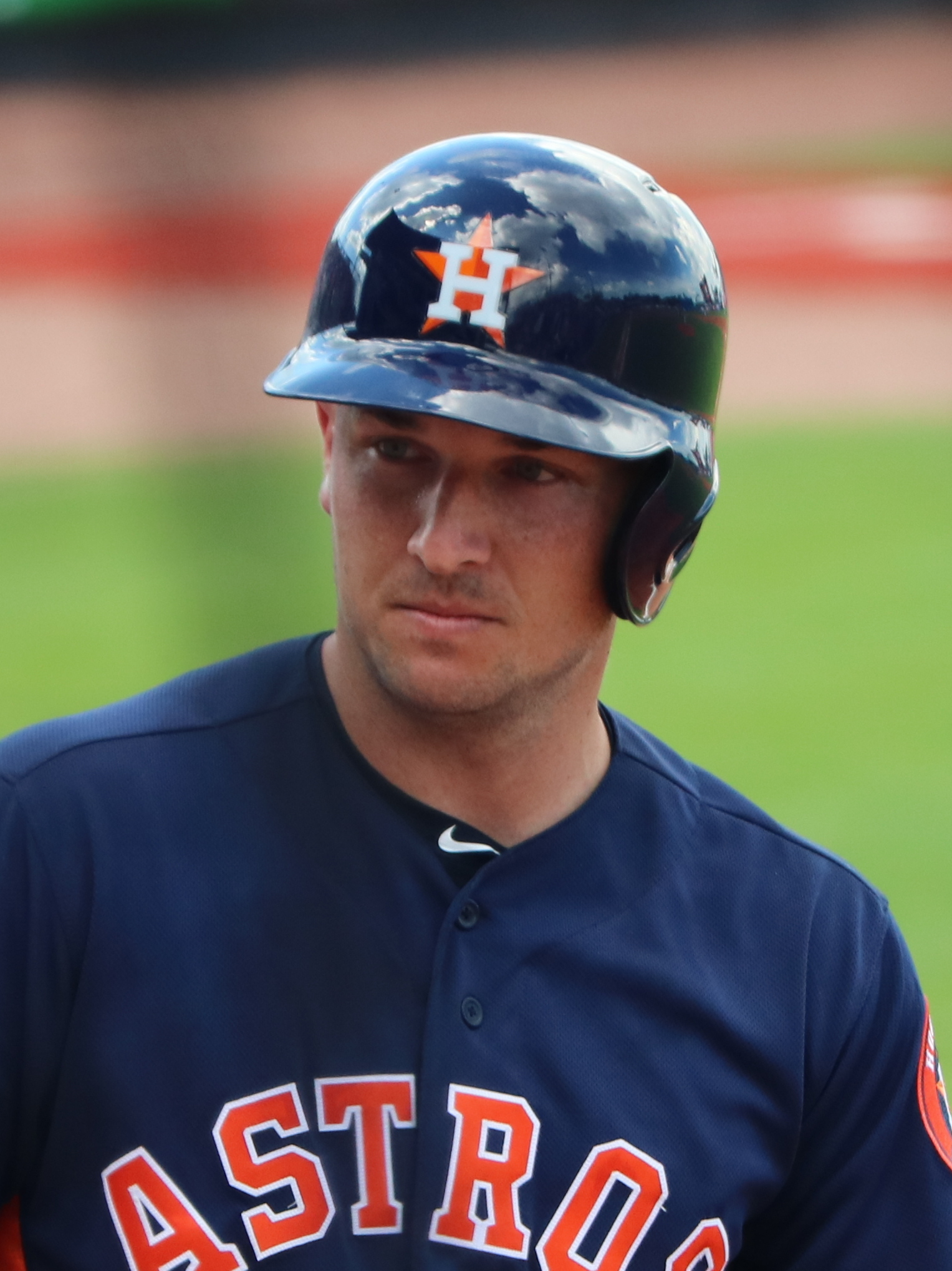
Alex Bregman,
Gold Glove Award
Silver Slugger Award winner

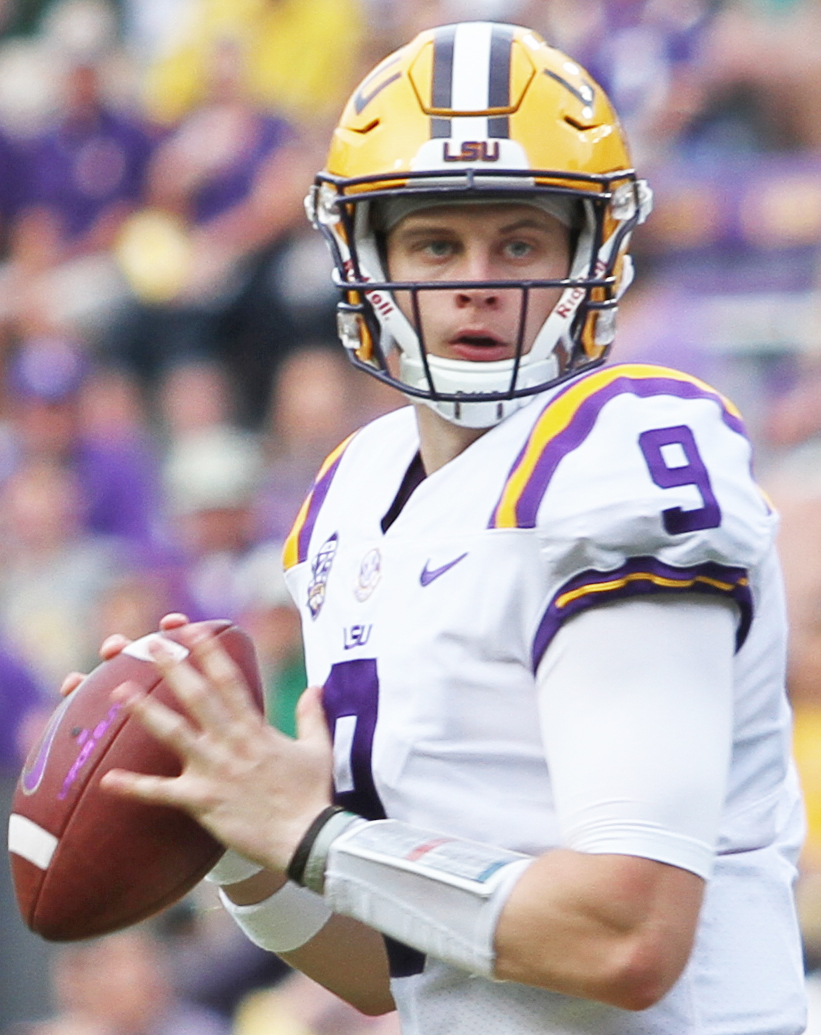
Joe Burrow,
Heisman Trophy winner
NFL quarterback

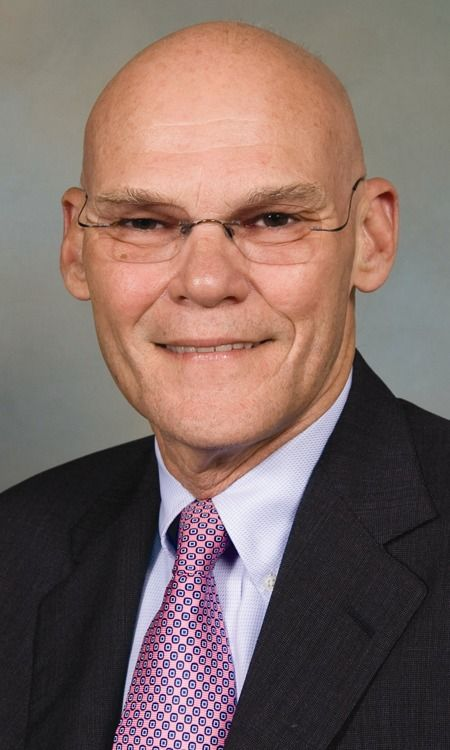
James Carville,
chief strategist for Bill Clinton's 1992 presidential campaign

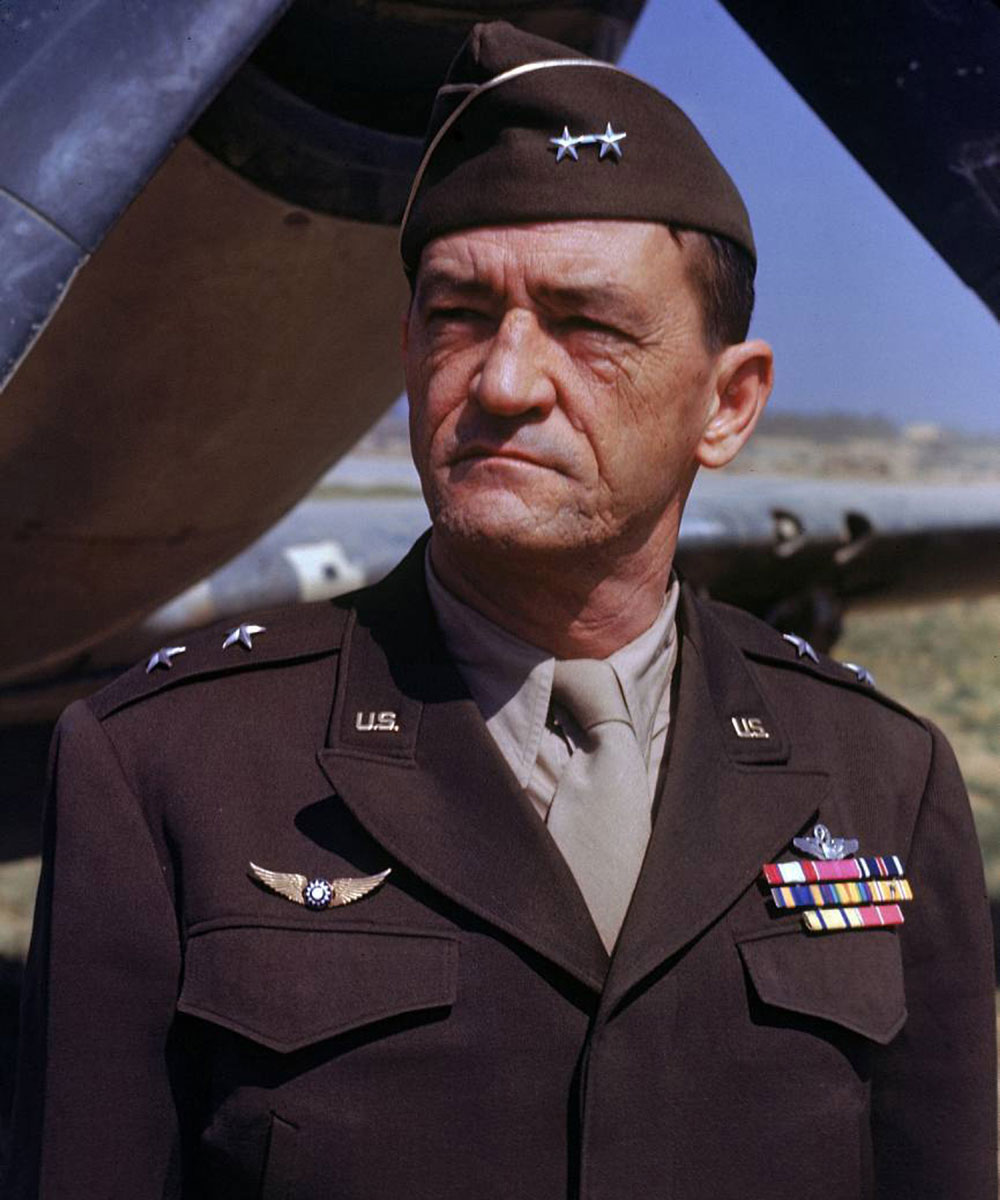
Lt Gen. Claire Lee Chennault,
commander of the Flying Tigers during World War II

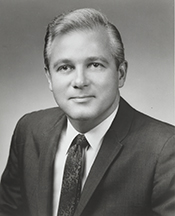
Edwin Edwards,
four-term governor of Louisiana
longest-serving governor in state history

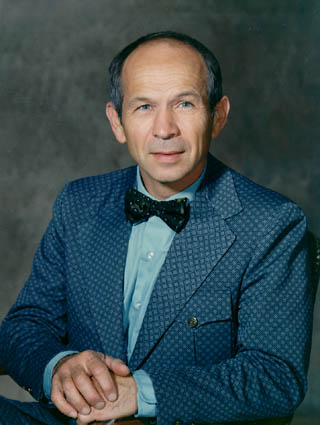
Maxime Faget,
lead designer of the Mercury spacecraft
key designer in Apollo, Gemini spacecraft & Space Shuttle

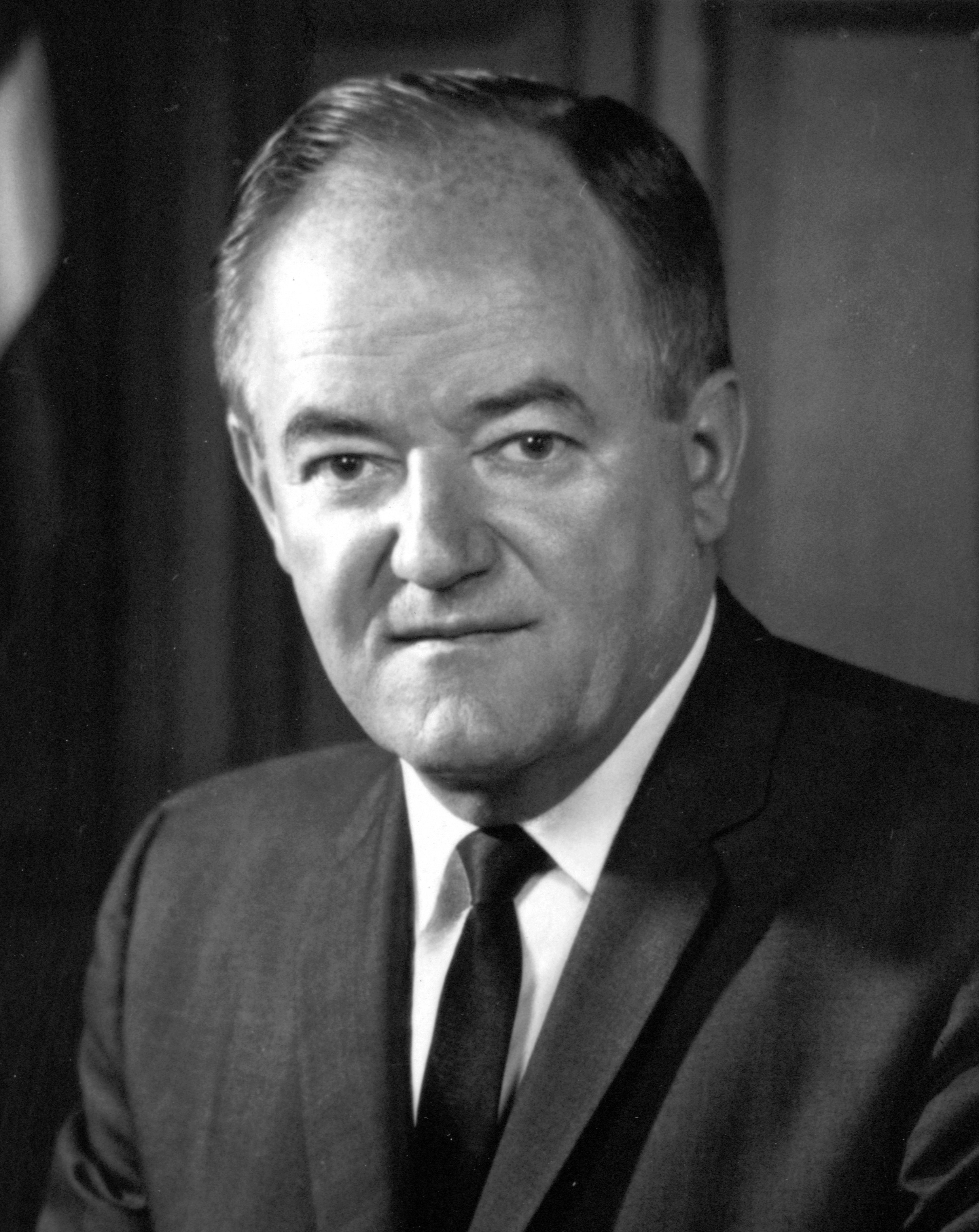
Hubert Humphrey,
38th vice president of the United States

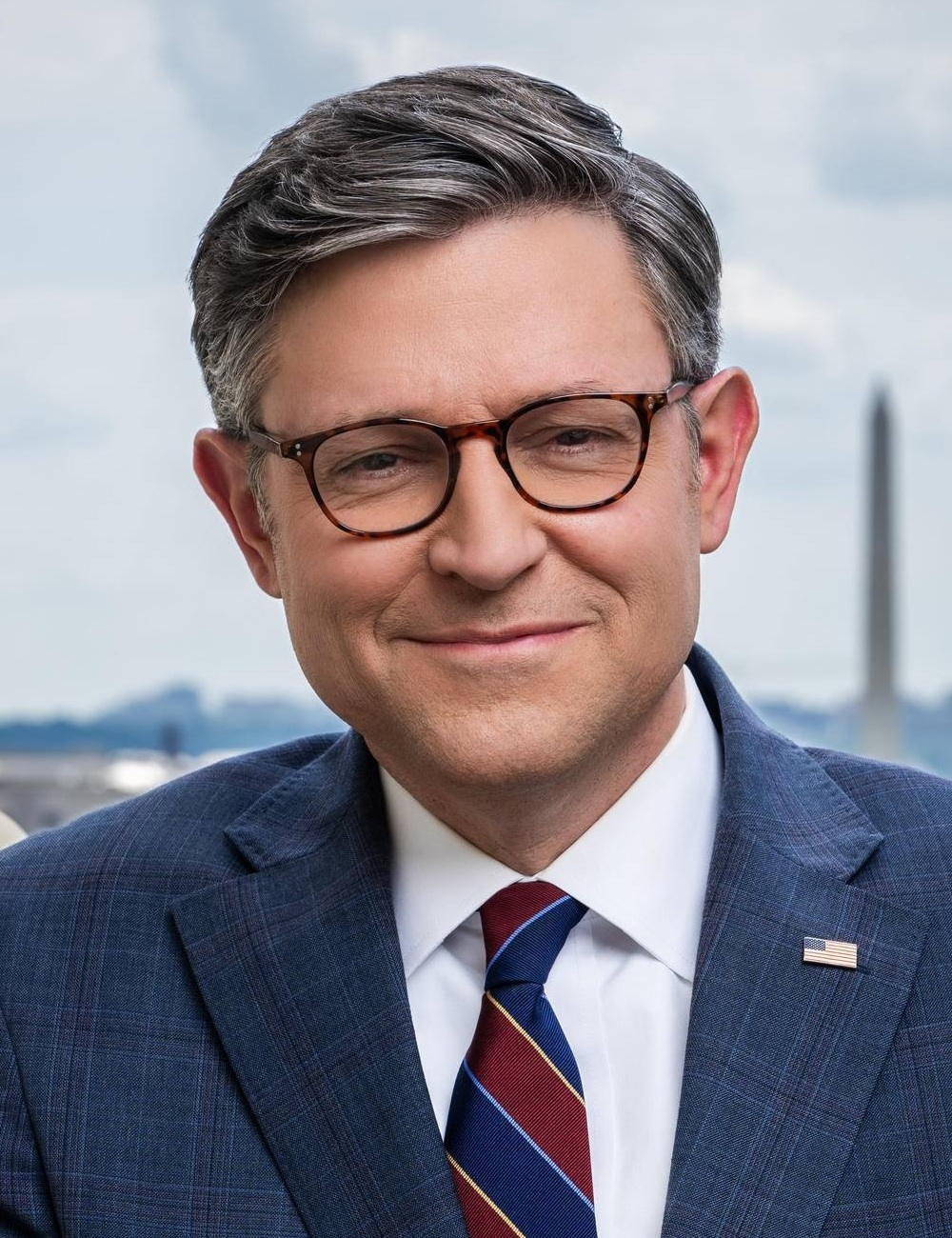
Mike Johnson,
56th speaker of the United States House of Representatives

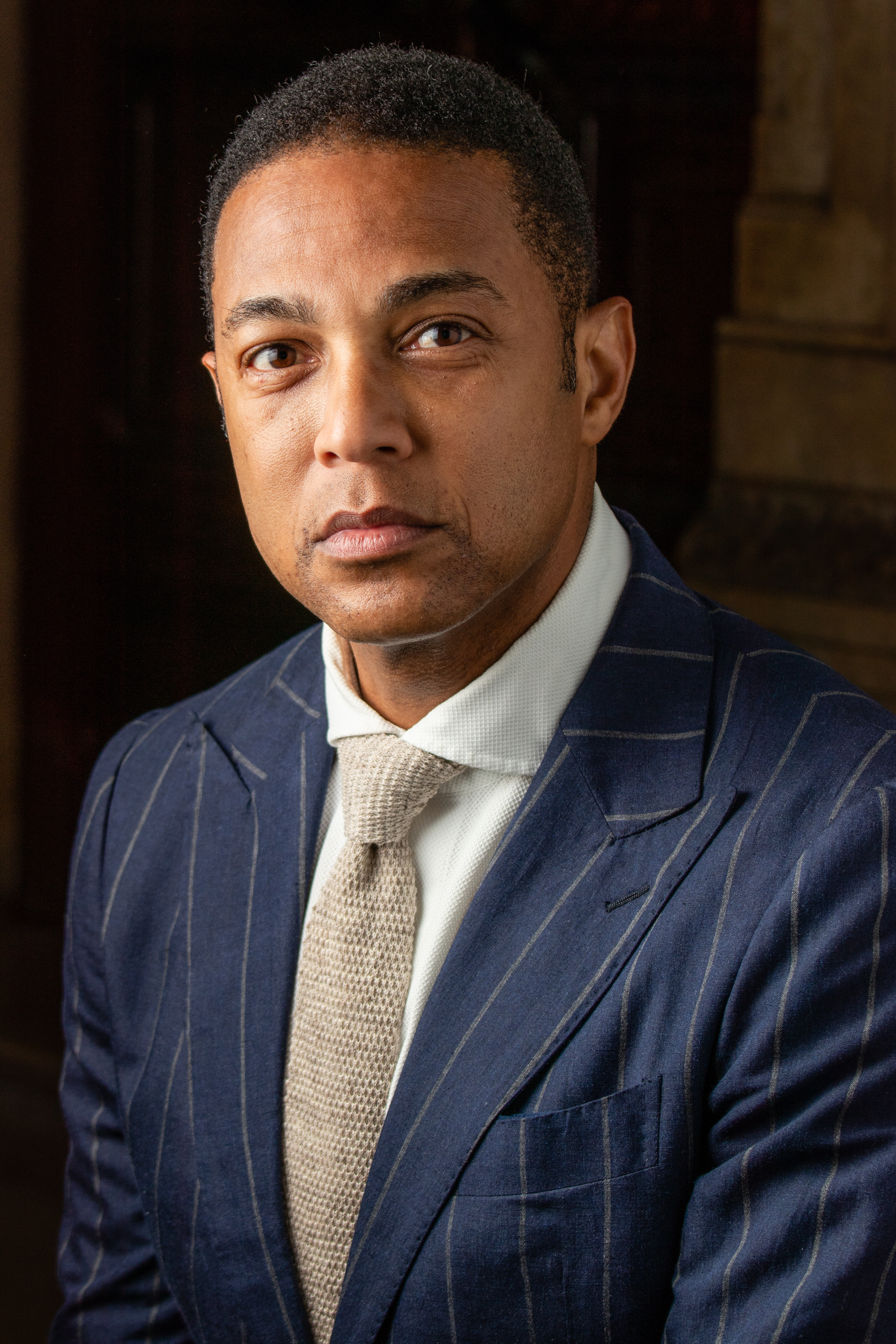
Don Lemon,
journalist and news anchor
Edward R. Murrow Award winner

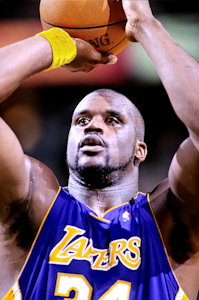
Shaquille O'Neal,
NBA Hall of Famer

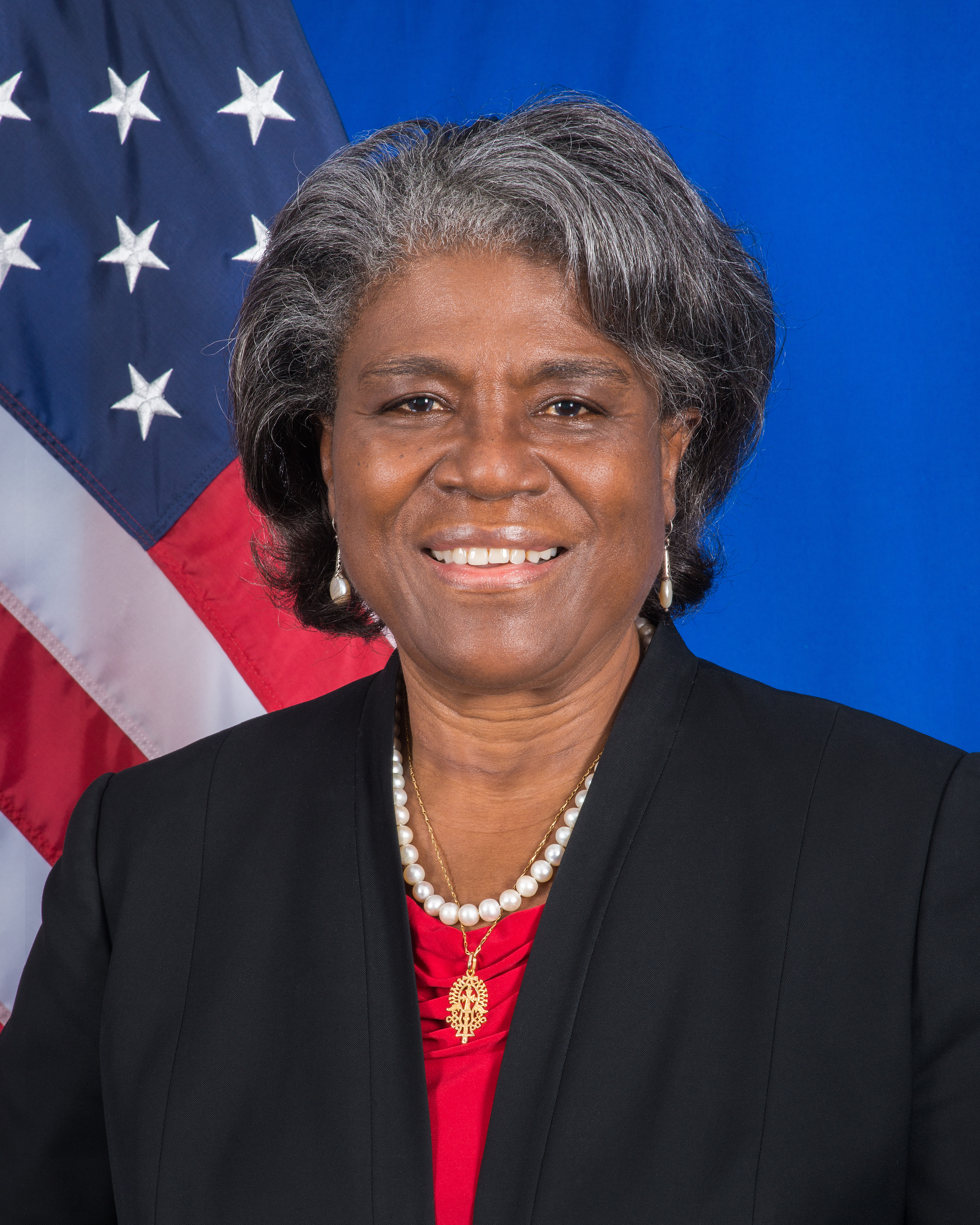
Linda Thomas-Greenfield,
former United States Ambassador to the United Nations

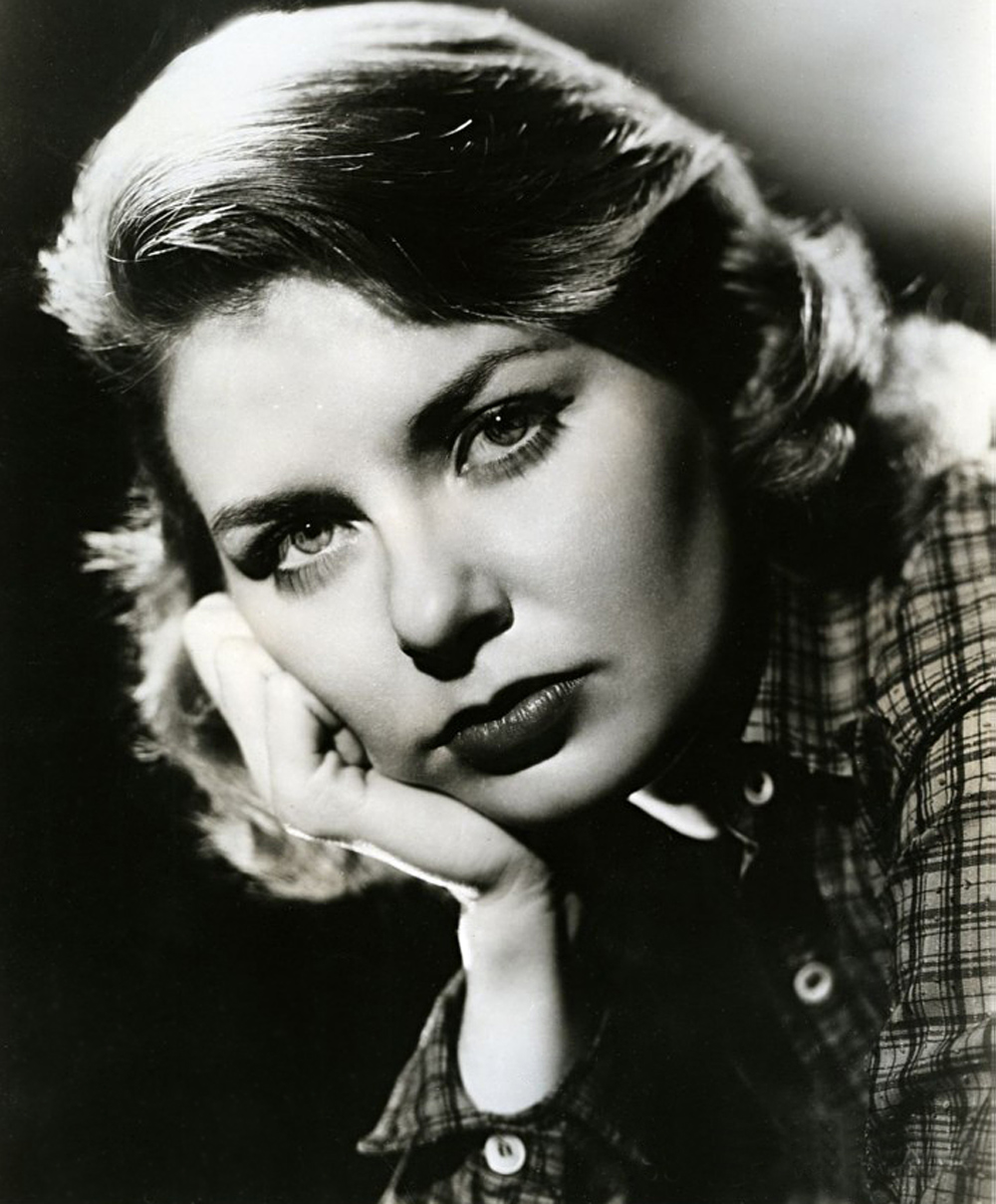
Joanne Woodward,
Academy Award-winning actress
Emmy Award
& Golden Globe winner

== See also ==
- American Student Dental Association
- Highland Road Park Observatory
- Hill Farm Community Garden
- List of forestry universities and colleges
- Louisiana Business Technology Center
- LSU Hilltop Arboretum
- LSU Tiger Trails
- National Register of Historic Places listings in East Baton Rouge Parish, Louisiana
