= Old LSU Site =

- U.S. National Register of Historic Places
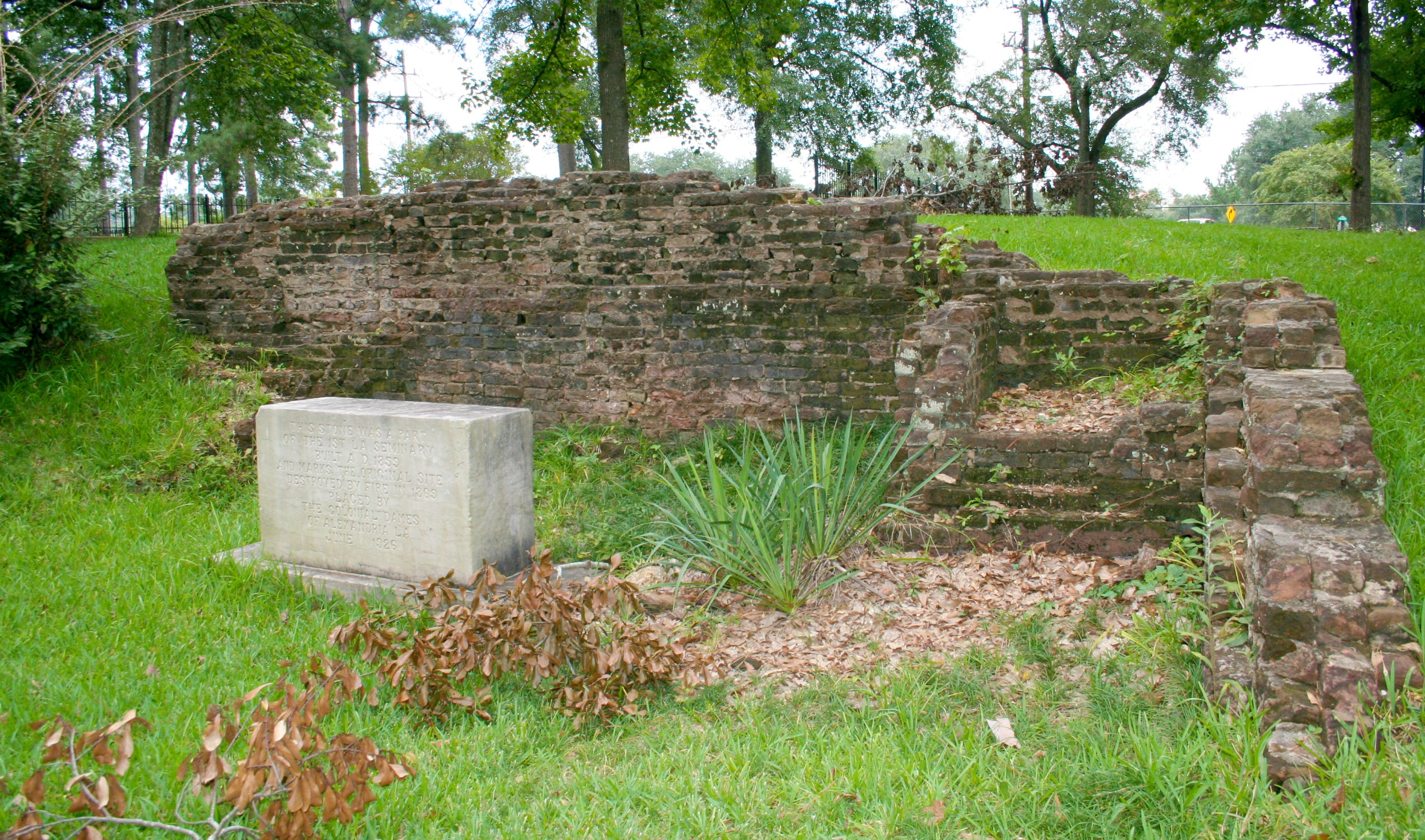

- Location within Louisiana Location within the United States
- Nearest city: Pineville, Louisiana
- Coordinates: 31°21′31″N 92°26′14″W
- Area: 2 acres (0.81 ha)
- Built: January 2, 1860; 166 years ago
- NRHP reference No.: 73000876
- Added to NRHP: August 14, 1973

The Old LSU Site is located in Pineville, Louisiana. In November 1859, the institution's main building was completed. The institution's first superintendent was Major William Tecumseh Sherman. On January 2, 1860, the college opened with five professors and 19 cadets. In March 1860, the school's name was changed to Louisiana State Seminary of Learning & Military Academy (le Lycee Scientifique et Militaire de l'Etat de la Louisiane). The state's legislature allowed for as many as 150 cadets, with scholarships for boarding expenses. The total number of cadets eventually reached 73. The cadets were referred to as "beneficiary" cadets.

After Louisiana seceded from the United States in January 1861, Sherman resigned as superintendent of the school. In April 1861, large numbers of students and faculty began resigning in order to enlist in the Confederate military. On June 30, 1861; the seminary closed. It later reopened on April 1, 1862, with Rev. W.E.M. Linfield as acting superintendent. On November 1, 1869, the school was moved from Pineville and relocated to the capital city of Baton Rouge, Louisiana. In March 1870, the school's name was changed to Louisiana State University (l'Universite' de l'Etat de la Louisiane).

It was added to the National Register of Historic Places on August 14, 1973.
