= Charles McClendon Practice Facility =

Sports facility at Louisiana State University

Coordinates: 30°24′37″N 91°11′23″W

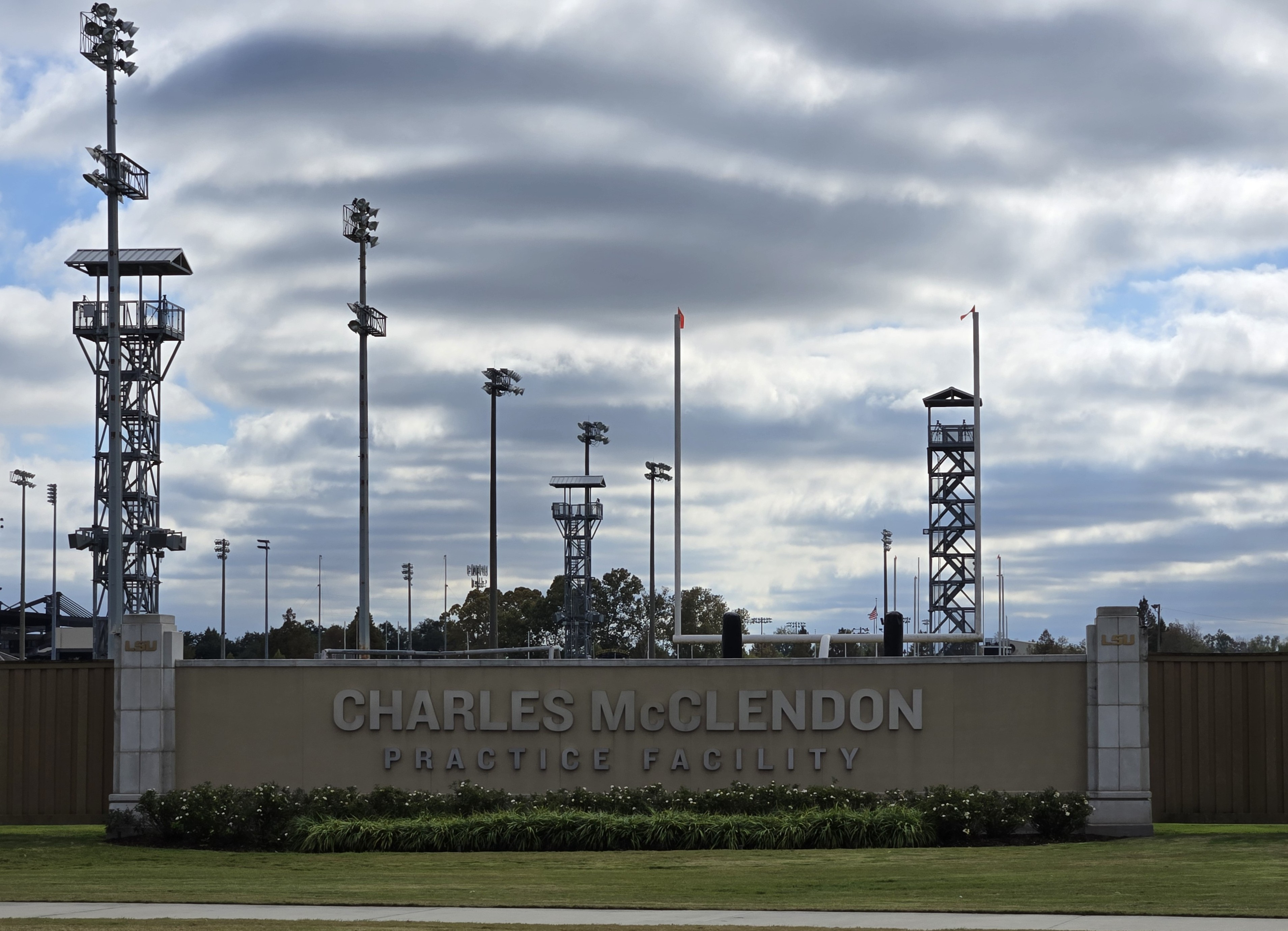
- Interactive map of Charles McClendon Practice Facility
- Location: Skip Bertman Drive; Baton Rouge, Louisiana 70803; USA
- Owner: Louisiana State University
- Operator: LSU Athletics Department
- Surface: Multi-surface

Tenant
- LSU Tigers football (NCAA)

The Charles McClendon Practice Facility is the practice facility for LSU Tigers football. The facility features the LSU Football Operations Center, the Tigers Indoor Practice Facility and four outdoor 100-yard football practice fields. In 2002, it was named after former LSU head coach and College Football Hall of Fame member, Charles McClendon.

== LSU Football Operations Center ==
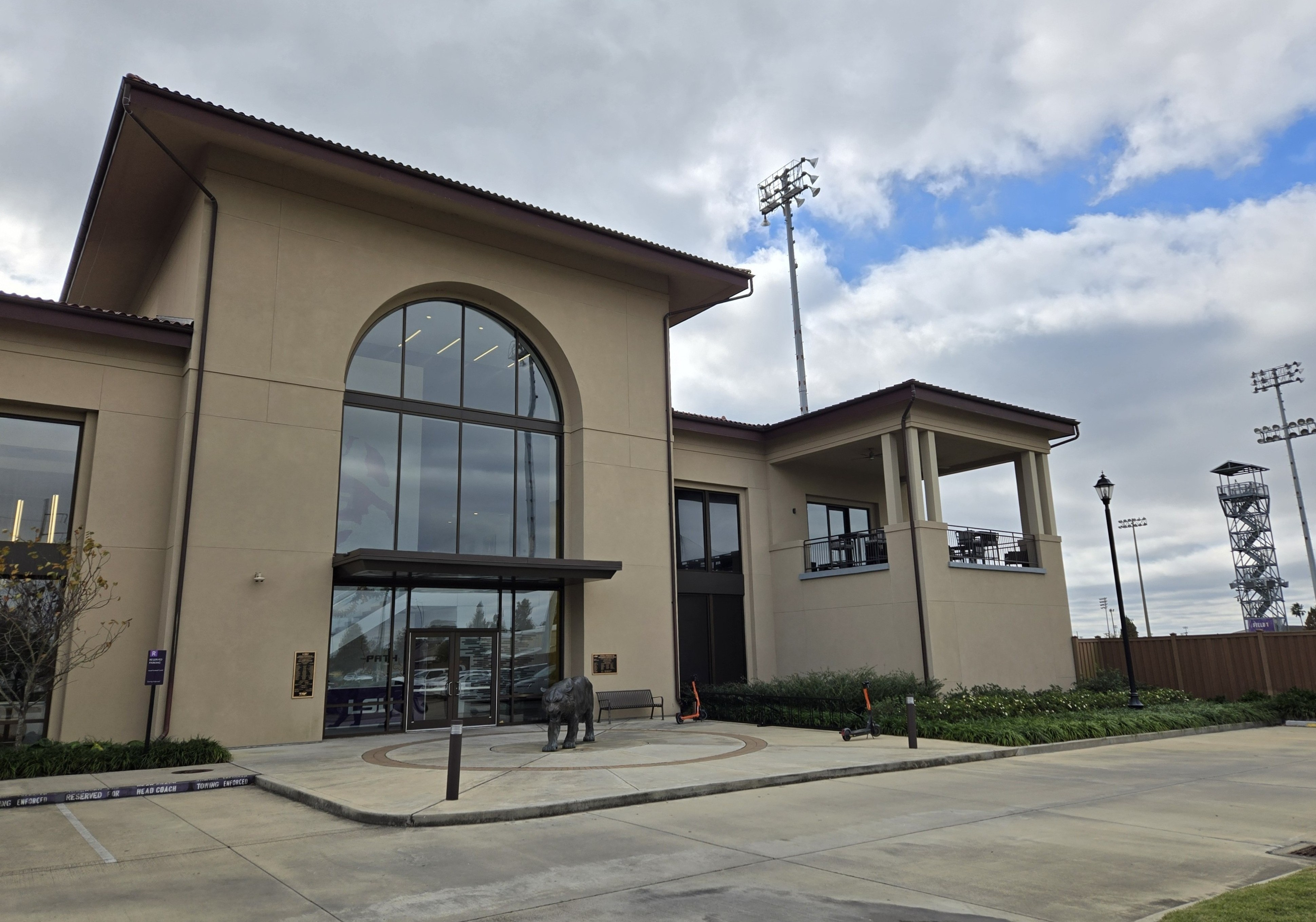
LSU Football Operations Center

The LSU Football Operations Center, built in 2006, is an all-in-one facility that includes the Tigers locker room, players' lounge, weight room, training room, equipment room, video operations center and coaches offices. The operations center atrium holds team displays and graphics, trophy cases and memorabilia of LSU football.

The locker room features 140 stations for the players with lockable storage bins and a padded seating area in addition to multiple high-definition TV's. The players' lounge includes computers at multiple work stations, pool tables and multiple gaming systems. The building holds individual position meeting rooms and the Shirley and Bill Lawton Team Room. The Lawton Team Room includes 144 theatre-style seats for team meetings and film sessions and audio and visual components for meetings, lectures and reviewing game footage.

The Peterson-Roberts weight room overlooking the outdoor football practice fields is over 15,000 square feet (1,400 m^{2}) and includes multi-purpose flat surface platform, bench, incline, squat and Olympic lifting stations along with dumbbell bench stations. It is also equipped with medicine balls, hurdles, plyometric boxes, assorted speed and agility equipment, treadmills, stationary bikes and elliptical cross trainers. The weight room features multiple high-definition TV's for multimedia presentations. The football, baseball and women’s soccer teams utilize the facility.

The training room also overlooking the outdoor practice fields features hydrotherapy which includes hot/cold jacuzzis and an underwater treadmill and multiple stations to treat the players.

The video operations center is equipped with editing equipment to review practice and game footage along with producing videos for the team. On the second floor, each coach has their own office and have access to multiple meetings rooms adjacent to their offices. A coaches' lounge is also located in the building.

In December 2014, LSU Athletic Director Joe Alleva announced the LSU Football Operations Center will be renovated. The weight room, training room and coaches' meeting rooms will be expanded, and the locker room, player’s lounge and position meeting rooms will be completely renovated.

== LSU Indoor Practice Facility ==
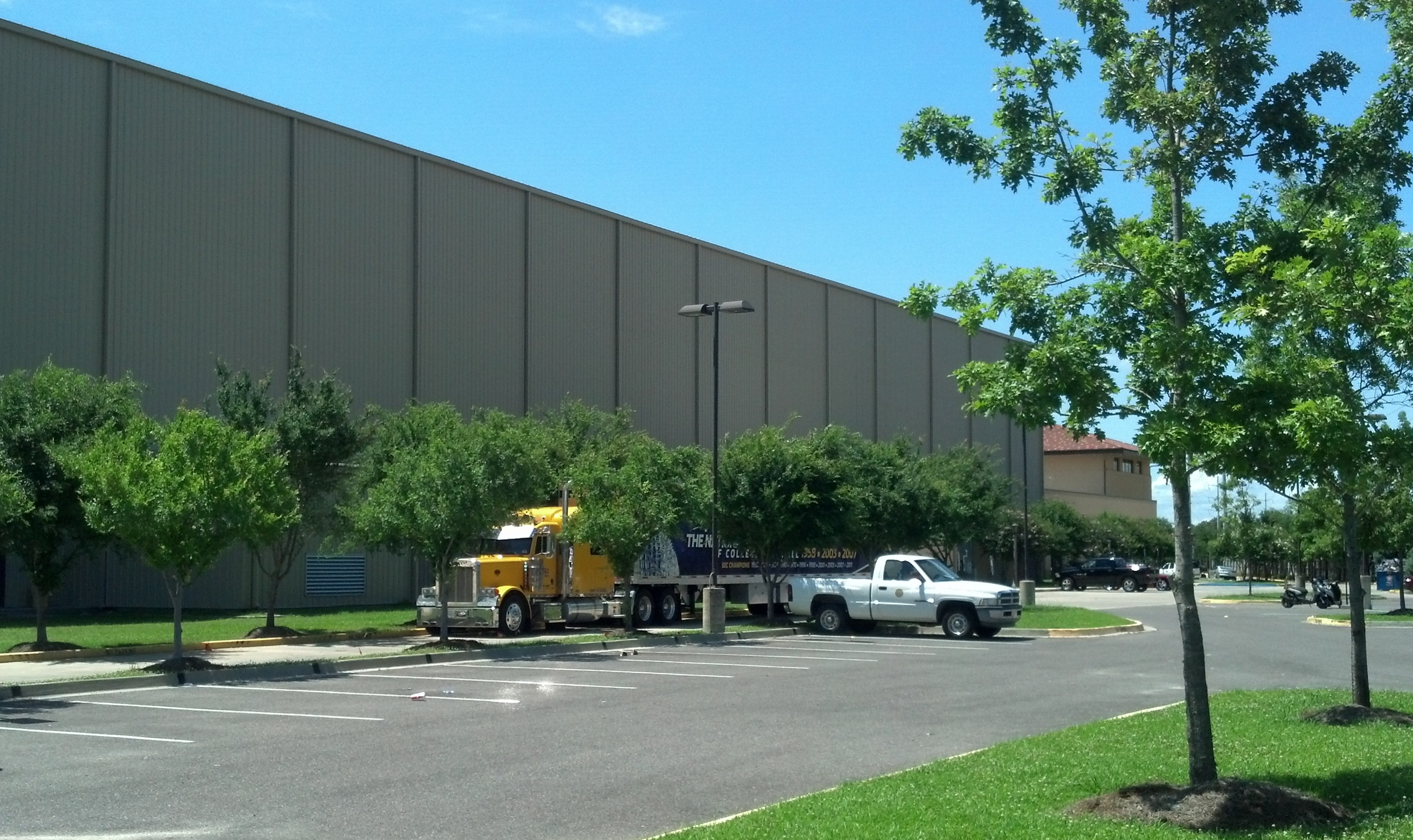
LSU Indoor Practice Facility

The LSU Indoor Practice Facility, built in 1991, is a climate-controlled 83,580 square feet facility connected to the Football Operations Center. It holds a 100-yd indoor field with Momentum Field Turf by SportExe. The indoor practice facility is located behind the football operations center.

== LSU Outdoor Practice Fields ==
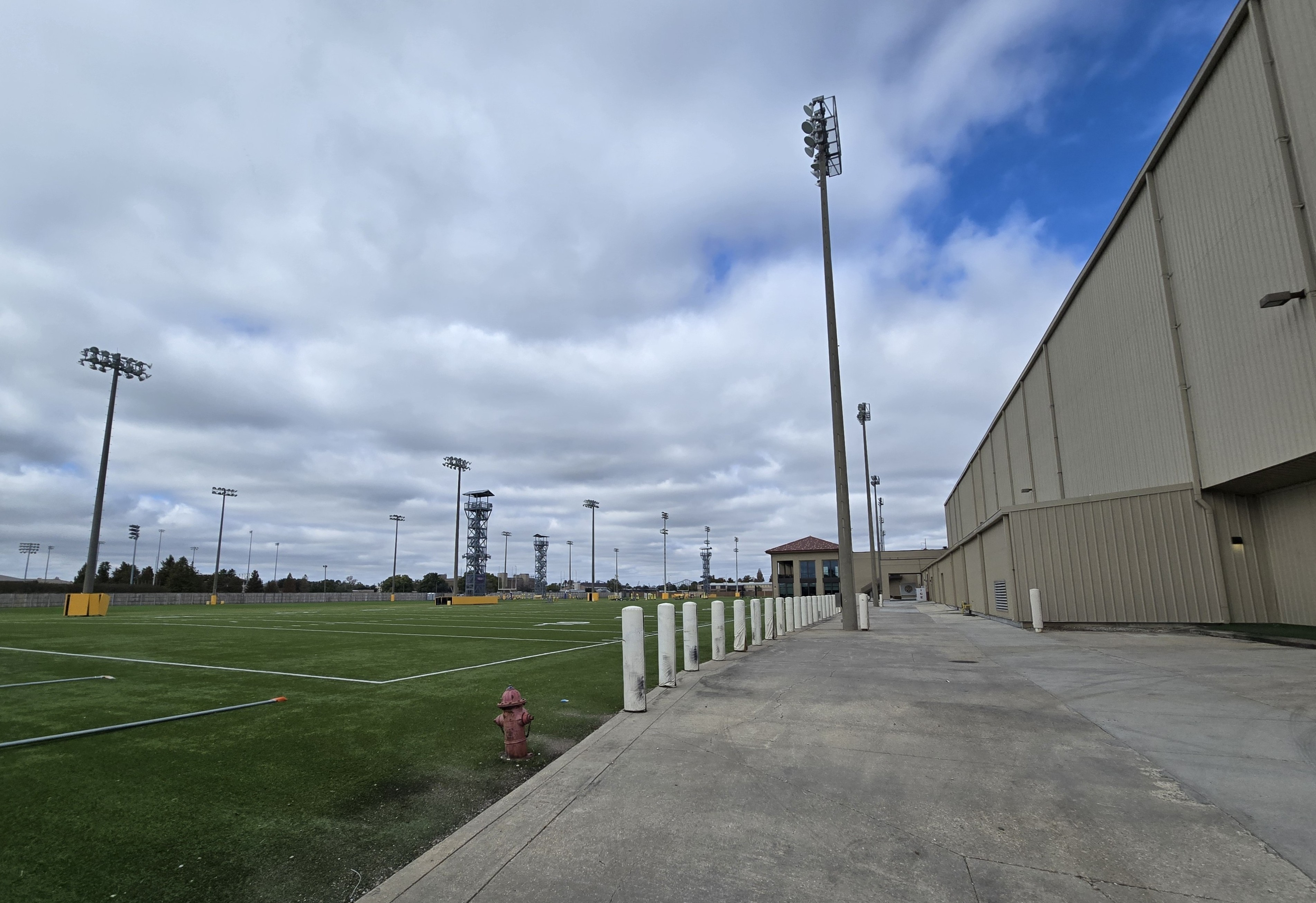
LSU Outdoor Practice Fields and Football Operations Center

The four outdoor practice fields are directly adjacent to the football operations center and indoor practice facility. Three of the fields are natural grass, while the fourth, The Scott & Espe Moran Outdoor Turf Field has a Momentum Field Turf by SportExe playing surface.

== See also ==
- LSU Football Operations Center
- LSU Indoor Practice Facility
- LSU Tigers football
- Tiger Stadium (LSU)
- LSU Tigers and Lady Tigers
