= LSU Football Operations Center =

Sports venue in Baton Rouge, Louisiana

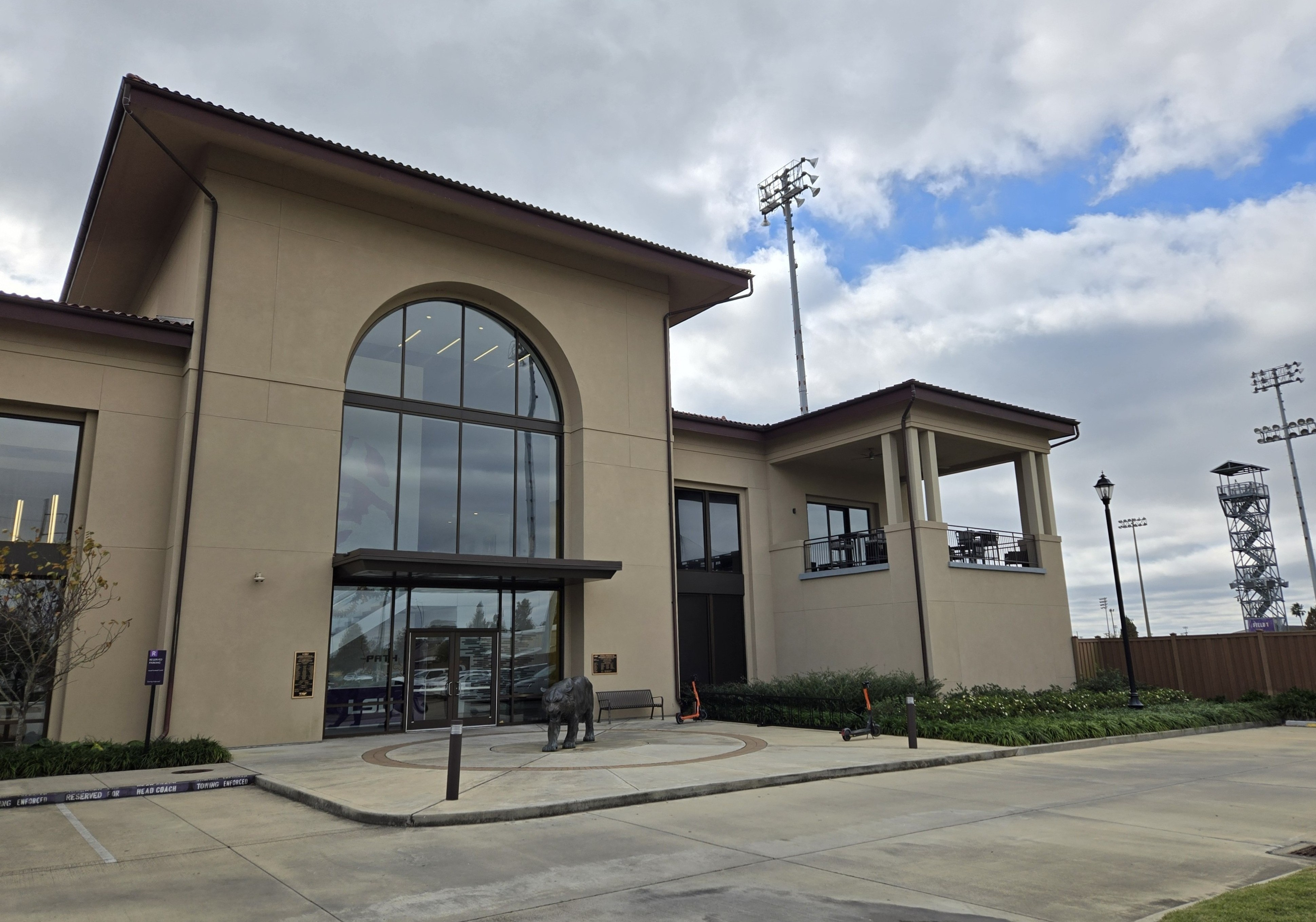
- Interactive map of LSU Football Operations Center
- Location: Skip Bertman Drive; Baton Rouge, Louisiana; United States
- Coordinates: 30.410930°N 91.188749°W
- Owner: Louisiana State University
- Operator: LSU Athletics Department

Construction
- Opened: 2006
- Cost: $15 million ($28 million renovation and expansion-2019)

Tenant
- LSU Tigers football (NCAA)

The LSU Football Operations Center, built in 2006, is an all-in-one facility that includes the Tigers locker room, players' lounge, Peterson-Roberts weight room, training room, equipment room, video operations center and coaches offices. The video operations center has editing equipment to review practice and game footage along with producing videos for the team.

The building holds individual position meeting rooms and the Shirley and Bill Lawton Team Room, including 144 theatre-style seats for team meetings and audiovisual facilities for meetings, lectures and reviewing game footage.

The Peterson-Roberts weight room overlooking the outdoor football practice fields is over 15,000 square feet (1,400 m^{2}) and includes a wide variety of exercise equipment.

In December 2014, LSU Athletic Director Joe Alleva announced the LSU Football Operations Center will be renovated. The weight room, training room and coaches' meeting rooms will be expanded, and the locker room, player's lounge and position meeting rooms will be completely renovated.

The LSU Tigers baseball team, LSU Tigers women's soccer team and LSU Tigers women's volleyball team use the weight room.

== Gallery ==
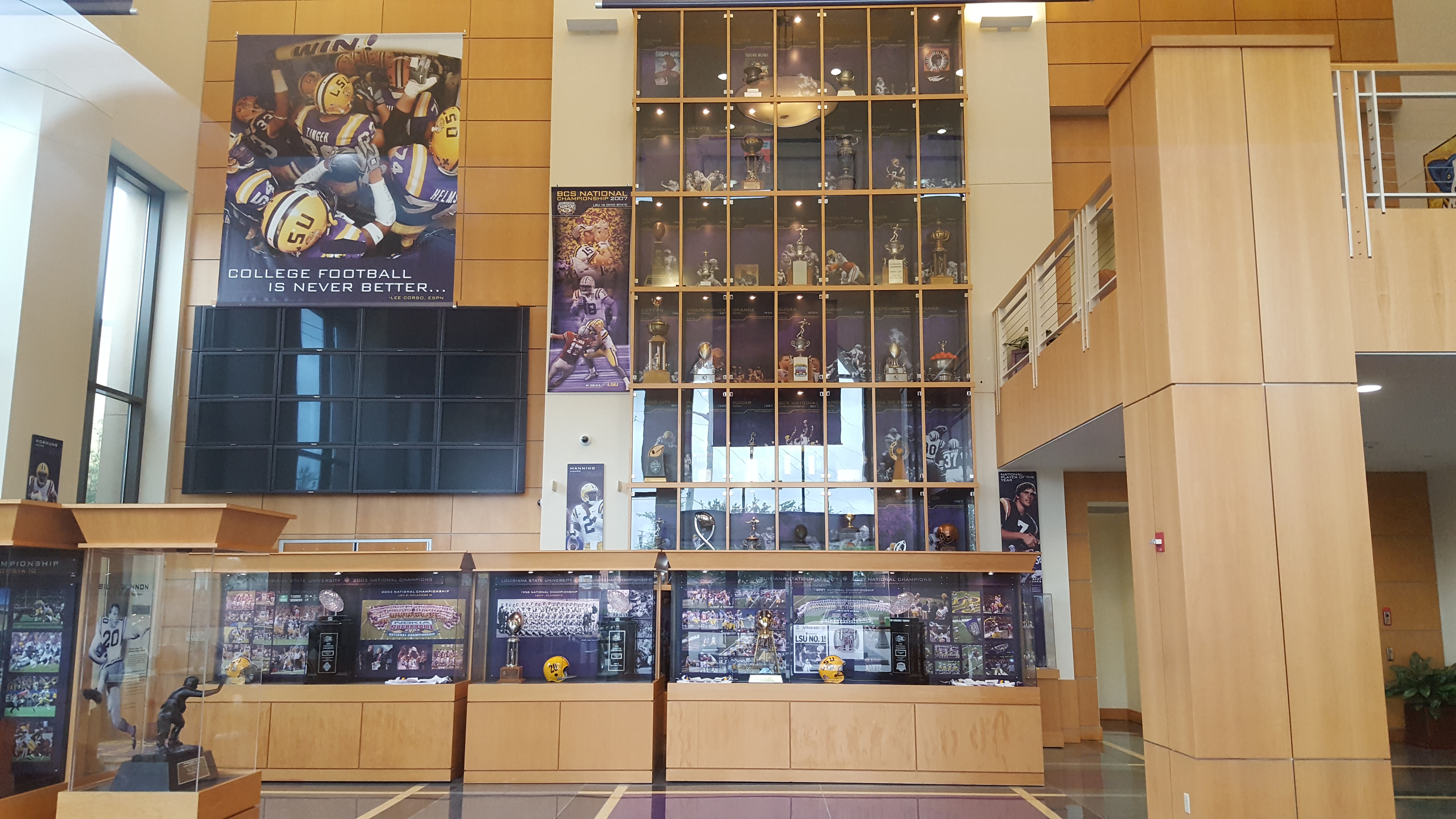
LSU Football Operations Center Atrium

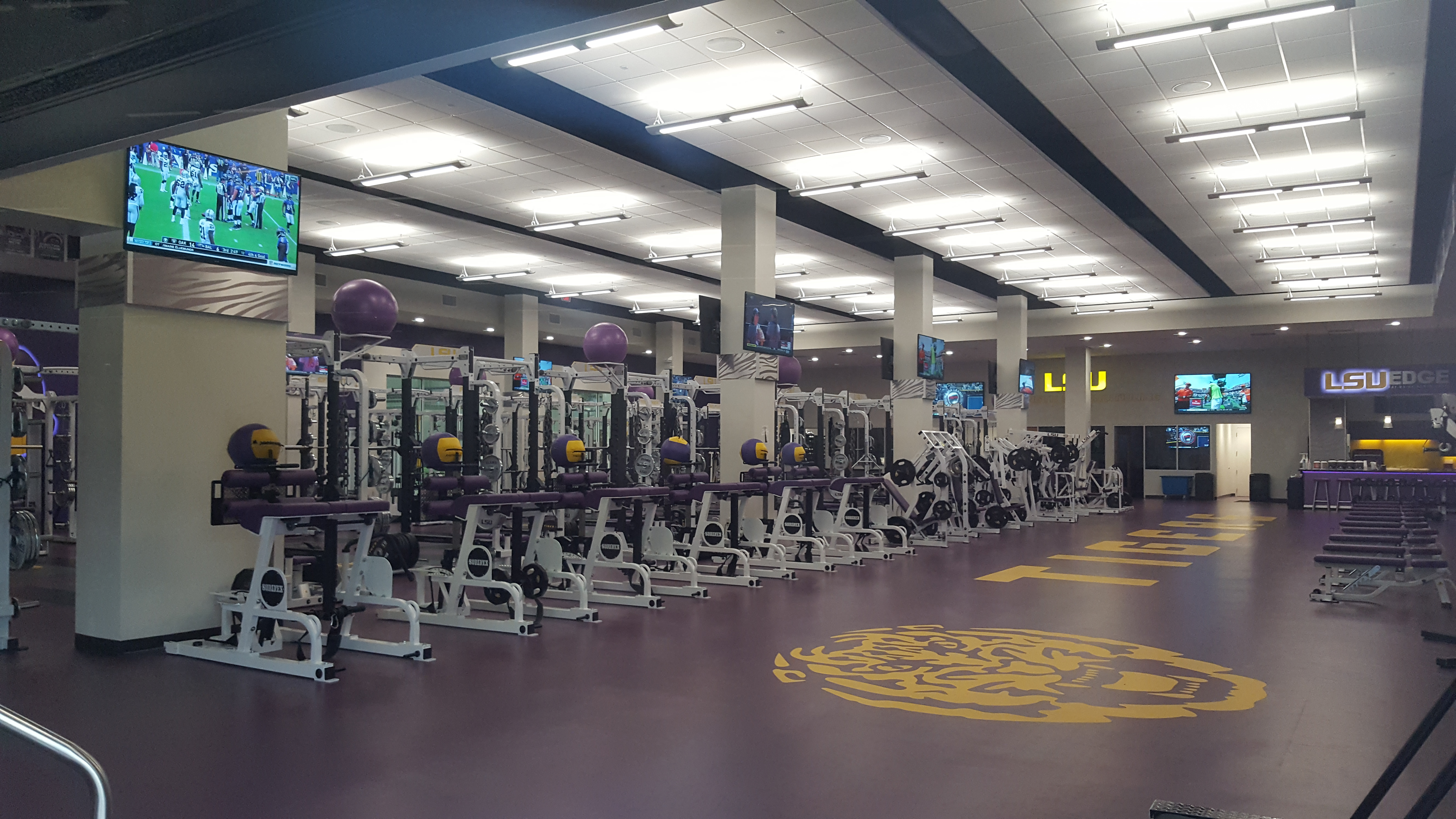
LSU Football Operations Center Weight Room and Nutrition Area

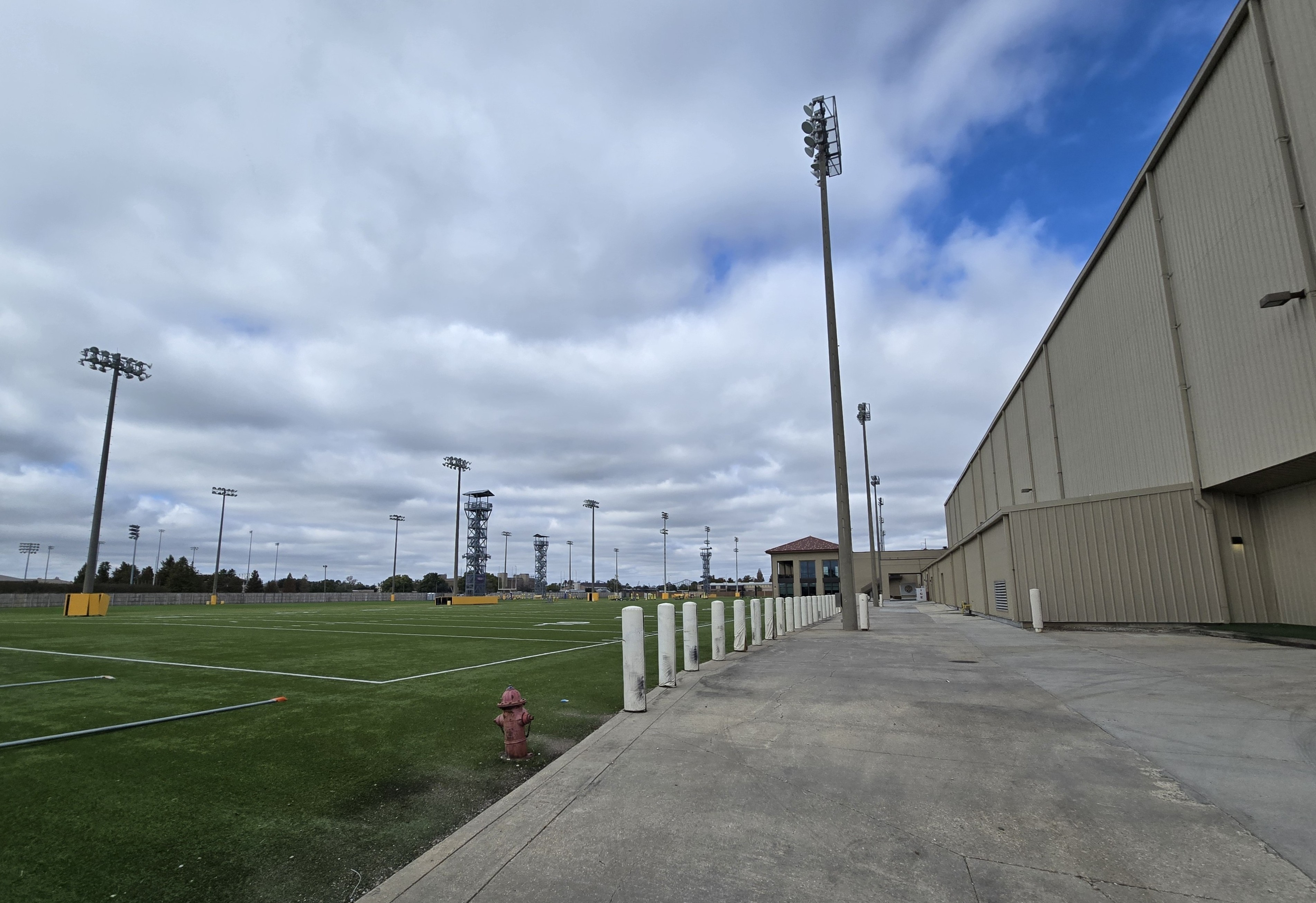
LSU Football Operations Center and Outdoor Practice Fields

== See also ==
- Charles McClendon Practice Facility
- LSU Indoor Practice Facility
- LSU Tigers football
- Tiger Stadium (LSU)
- LSU Tigers and Lady Tigers
