= Tiger Stadium (Louisiana) =

Football stadium at Louisiana State University

- Death Valley
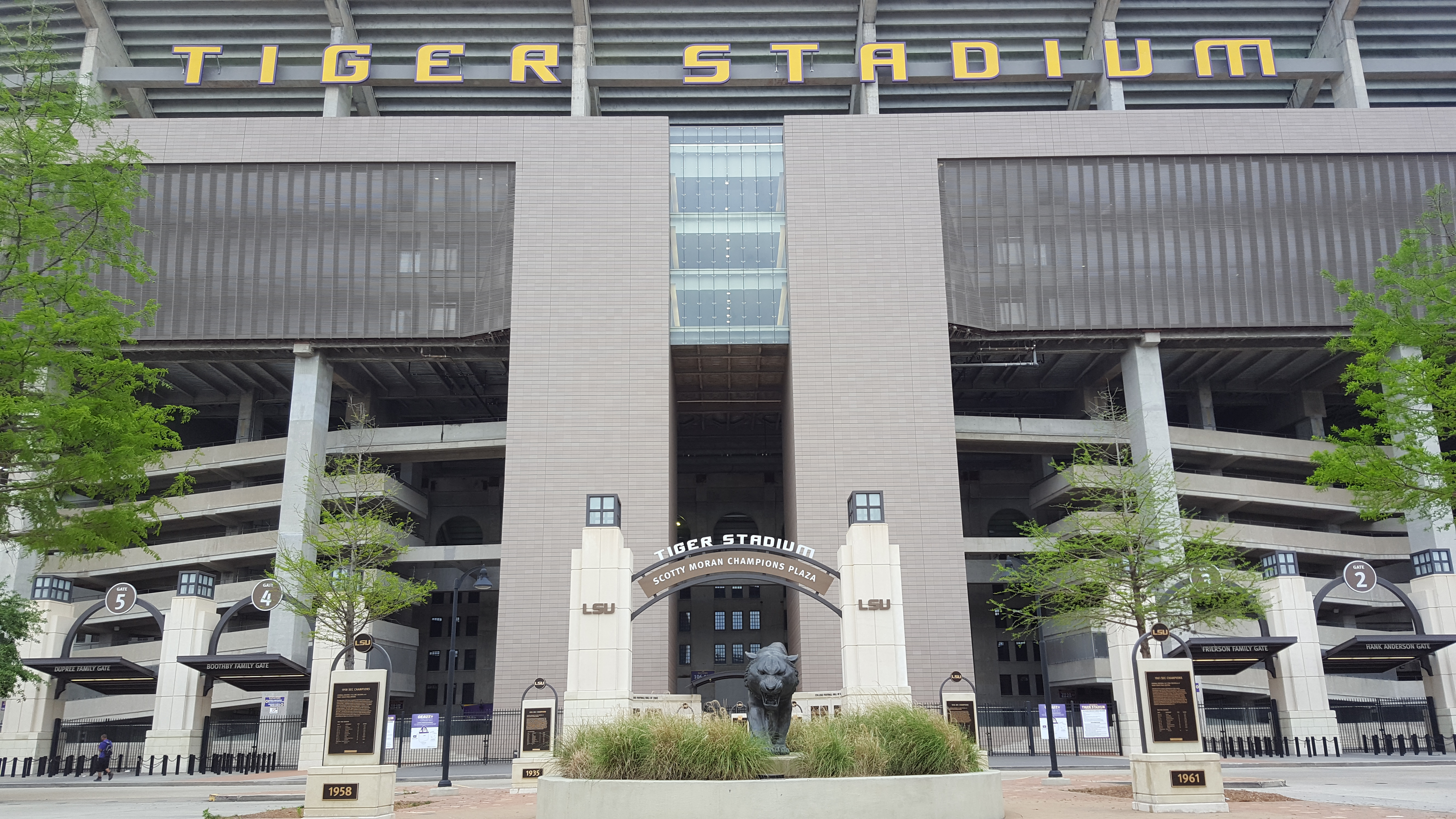
- Tiger Stadium in 2017
- Interactive map of Tiger Stadium
- Address: West Stadium Road
- Location: Baton Rouge, Louisiana
- Coordinates: 30°24′44″N 91°11′2″W
- Capacity: 102,321 (2014–present); 92,542 (2011–14); 92,400 (2005–10); 91,600 (2000–04); 80,000 (1994–99); 80,150 (1987–93); 78,000 (1978–86); 67,500 (1953–77); 46,000 (1936–52); 24,000 (1931–35); 12,000 (1924–30)
- Surface: Celebration Bermuda Grass
- Scoreboard: Daktronics
- Record attendance: Football: 102,321 (Eighteen times, most recently September 12, 2026, vs Louisiana Tech); Concert: 102,000 (The Garth Brooks Stadium Tour, April 30, 2022)

Construction
- Groundbreaking: 1924
- Opened: November 25, 1924
- Renovated: 1994, 2006, 2011, 2014
- Expanded: 1931, 1936, 1953, 1978, 1988, 2000, 2014
- Years active: 1924-present
- Cost: $1,816,210.58 (1936 horseshoe) ($42.1 million in 2025 dollars) $183 million (renovations and expansions)
- Architects: Wogan and Bernard; Trahan Architects (renovations)

Tenants
- LSU Tigers football (NCAA) (1924–present); Grantland Rice Bowl (1974-1975); New Orleans Saints (NFL) (2005)

Website
- lsusports.net/tiger-stadium

Tiger Stadium, also called Death Valley, is an outdoor stadium located in Baton Rouge, Louisiana, on the campus of Louisiana State University. It is the home stadium of the LSU Tigers football team. Prior to 1924, LSU played its home games at State Field, which was located on the old LSU campus in Downtown Baton Rouge.

Tiger Stadium opened with a capacity of 12,000 in 1924. Renovations and expansions have brought the stadium's current capacity to 102,321, making it the second largest stadium in the Southeastern Conference (SEC) behind Kyle Field of Texas A&M, the fifth largest stadium in the NCAA and the seventh largest stadium in the world.

== Testimonials ==
Despite being 14–2 at Tiger Stadium, famed Alabama head coach Bear Bryant once remarked that "Baton Rouge happens to be the worst place in the world for a visiting team. It's like being inside a drum." In 2001, ESPN sideline reporter Adrian Karsten said, "Death Valley in Baton Rouge is the loudest stadium I've ever been in." In 2003, ESPN's Chris Fowler called LSU his favorite game day experience. In 2009, former Arkansas governor Mike Huckabee stated on Sean Hannity's Fox News show that "Unfair is playing LSU on a Saturday night in Baton Rouge."

Survey after survey has concluded that Tiger Stadium is the most difficult place for a visiting team to play, including surveys by the College Football Association in 1987, The Sporting News in 1989, Gannett News Service in 1995, and Sport Magazine in 1998. More recently, in 2007, ESPN named Tiger Stadium "the scariest place to play", saying that "Tiger Stadium is, by far, the loudest stadium in the country."

In 2009, ESPN writer Chris Low listed Tiger Stadium's Saturday night atmosphere as unsurpassed in the country, ranking it No. 1 out of the SEC's 12 stadiums. In 2016, Tiger Stadium was again ranked No. 1 out of the conference's 14 stadiums by USA Today writers Laken Litman & Steven Ruiz.

LSU prefers night games in Tiger Stadium with its opponents, but television coverage requires that many contests be played in the afternoons. The university is conflicted between maximizing its potential to win and needed advertising revenues from television coverage. As explained by Chet Hilburn in The Mystique of Tiger Stadium: 25 Greatest Games: The Ascension of LSU Football, "The Tigers are apt to win more games at night in Tiger Stadium but the university takes in much more revenue for a day game televised by CBS because of the Southeastern Conference contract with the network is so lucrative."

In 2008, as Alabama narrowly defeated LSU, Wright Thompson of ESPN.com described Tiger Stadium as "the best place in the world to watch a sporting event."

In 2013, the NCAA ranked Tiger Stadium as the loudest stadium in all of college football.

In 2014, the No. 3-ranked Ole Miss Rebels played the No. 24-ranked LSU Tigers on October 25. After the Tigers held the Rebels to only 7 points in a 10–7 victory, Ole Miss quarterback Bo Wallace stated, "It's a crazy atmosphere. This is the craziest place I've played."

In 2024, ESPN.com published the results of a poll of 14 of their college football writers for the "best stadiums in the sport." The writers picked their top 20 stadiums, and points were awarded based on placement. Tiger Stadium was awarded first place in the poll with a score of 247 points out of a possible total of 280. Writer Chris Low included a note that "Soaking up the atmosphere on a Saturday night in Tiger Stadium is pure nirvana for football fans."

== Construction and stadium capacity ==
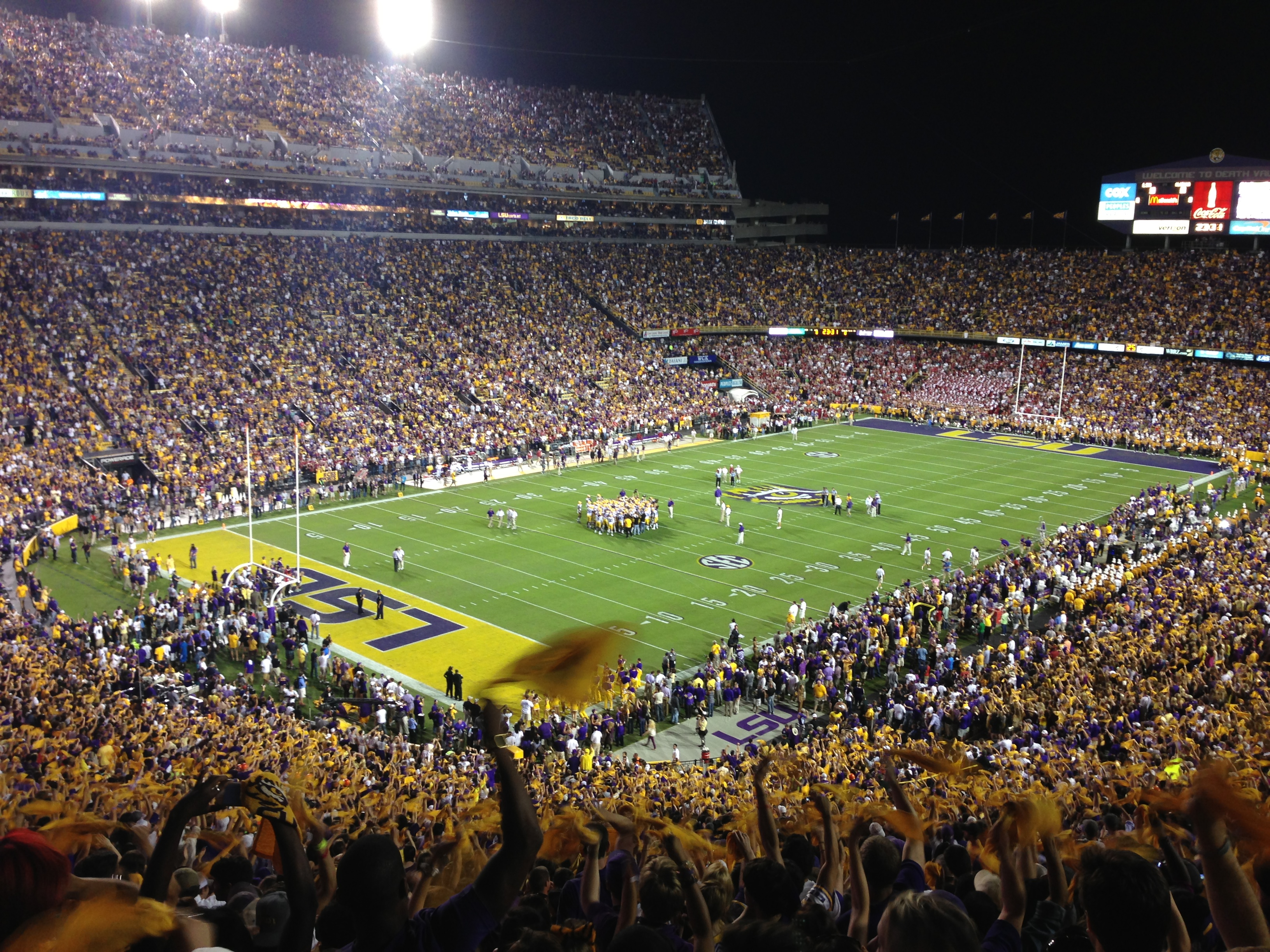
View from LSU student section toward the South End Zone, prior to the 2014 expansion.

With an official seating capacity of 102,321, Tiger Stadium is the seventh-largest stadium in the world by capacity. It is the fifth-largest stadium in the NCAA and the second-largest in the Southeastern Conference, behind Kyle Field at Texas A&M University (102,733) and slightly larger than Bryant-Denny Stadium at Alabama (100,077) and Neyland Stadium at Tennessee (101,915).

The stadium opened in 1924 and originally seated 12,000—the lower half of the current facility's grandstands on the east and west sidelines. In 1931, 10,000 seats were added to the existing grandstands.

In 1936 capacity was more than doubled by enclosing the north end zone with 24,000 seats, turning the stadium into a horseshoe. Money was not allocated in the state budget for the seating expansion, but money was allocated for dormitories. According to local legend, Governor Huey P. Long, who had always taken a personal interest in LSU, ordered that dormitories be built in the stadium, with seating above the student living quarters. However, in a 2015 ESPN story, Bud Johnson, at the time director of LSU's athletics museum and also a former LSU sports information director, said that the idea actually came from LSU's athletic director T. P. "Skipper" Heard, while "the governor helped in other ways." Until the late 1980s, the West, North and South Stadium dormitories were featured as part of student housing at LSU, and the football team even lived in them during the 1986 season while the athletic dormitory was being renovated. The dormitories were later converted to office space for Athletic Department staff and faculty and studios for the College of Art & Design's Fine Arts graduate students, but by 2015 were no longer used.

More than 21,000 seats were added in the south end zone in 1953, turning the stadium into a 67,720-seat bowl, making Tiger Stadium the largest on-campus stadium in the SEC, a distinction it would hold until Neyland Stadium expanded to 80,250 in 1976. Unlike the existing stadium structure, they were double-decked in order to fit within the space provided. The first of the two upper decks was added to the west side of the stadium in 1978 to bring capacity to approximately 78,000.

The stadium was upgraded multiple times in the 1980s beginning with replacement of bench seats with chair back seats and waterproofing of the east and west stands in 1985. The playing surface was moved 11 feet (3.4 m) to the south to center the field in 1986. The north and south ends of the stadium were waterproofed and chair back seats added in 1987 to bring those sections up to date with the 1985 improvements. Also in 1987 the press box was redecorated, a few more seats were installed at the upper portion of the west lower stands, and all seating within the stadium was renumbered using a uniform seat-width. By the end of the 1980s the stadium held 80,150 spectators.

The official capacity of the stadium was lowered to 80,000 in 1994 when a section of seating was removed for renovations to the visiting team locker room. The east upper deck seating 11,600 was completed in 2000 and brought total capacity to 91,600. The west upper deck was torn down at the end of the 2004 season, and construction began on "The Stadium Club". The new suites contain over 3,200 special amenity seats as well as a state-of-the-art press box. The "Paul Manasseh Press Box" has been named for and dedicated to the memory of the long-time and popular sports information director. Construction on this addition was scheduled to be completed by the beginning of September 2005, but delayed due to Hurricane Katrina. Construction was completed for the 2006 season, bringing the stadium's capacity to 92,400. A small number of club seats were added before the 2011 season, increasing the capacity to 92,542.

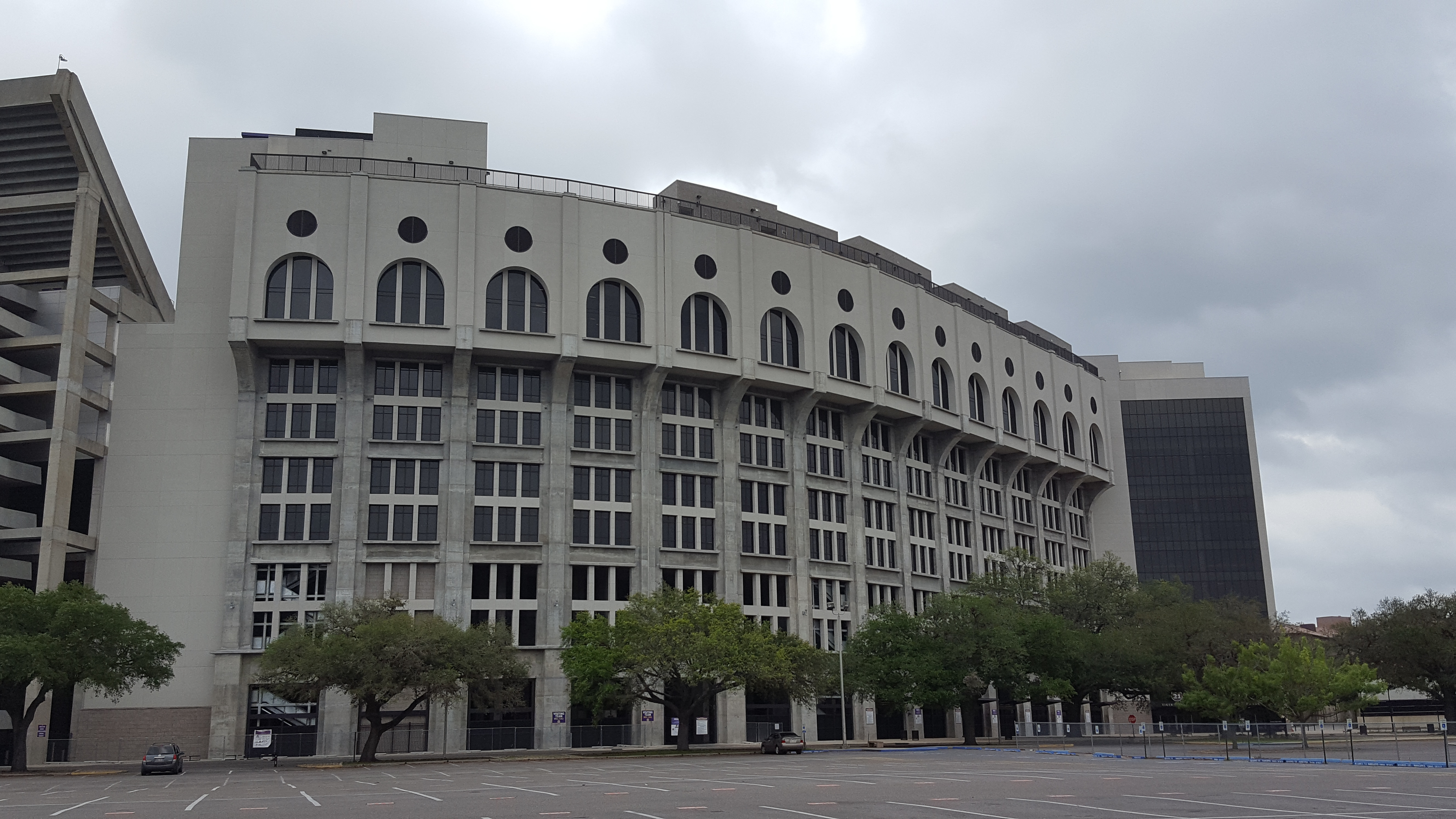
2014 South End Zone expansion

During construction on the west side, a then-record-breaking crowd of 92,664 fans packed Tiger Stadium in a game against Auburn on October 22, 2005, as LSU defeated Auburn in overtime, 20–17. On October 6, 2007, a new record was recorded when 92,910 fans watched as the number 1-ranked Tigers defeated the number 9 Florida Gators, 28–24. A record-breaking attendance of 93,039 was again set on November 8, 2008, when number 1 Alabama defeated (16) LSU in overtime 27–21. The record was breached yet again on October 10, 2009, when the #1 ranked Florida Gators came into Tiger Stadium and defeated (4) LSU 13–3. The attendance was 93,129. The old capacity record of 93,374 was set on November 3, 2012, when (5) LSU lost to (1) Alabama 21–17, and the current record of 101,194 was set on September 13, 2014, when (10) LSU defeated Louisiana–Monroe 31–0.

On April 27, 2012, the LSU Board of Supervisors voted unanimously in favor of an $80 million south end-zone upper deck expansion that added 70 "Tiger Den" suites, over 3,000 club seats and 1,500+ general public seats to bring the total capacity of Tiger Stadium to 102,321, making it the fifth-largest college football stadium in the country. Construction began on October 17, 2012, and was completed by the summer of 2014. The project was privately funded by Tiger Athletic Foundation.

Beginning with the 2017 football season, Tiger Stadium added the "Skyline Club". This open air seating located atop the south end zone upper deck is home to a 1,500 seat "beer garden". Purchase of a ticket in the Skyline Club includes admission to the seating area, admission to a self-serve food buffet, and the ability to purchase beer and wine. The 2018 football season saw the appearance of an additional "beer garden" called "The Chute". This new beer drinking area is located below the south endzone bleachers. It is limited to 1,500 patrons at a time. Fans entering The Chute must be at least 21 years of age, and pay a $20 admission fee that includes two complimentary beers. Additional beers must be purchased separately. The Chute has a large screen television set for watching the game, as well as a seating area consisting of tables and chairs. In 2019, alcohol sales were opened stadium wide.

Top 10 largest crowds
Rank	Attendance	Visiting team	Date	Result
1.	102,321	Alabama	Nov. 5, 2022	LSU, 32–31
1.	102,321	Tennessee	Oct. 8, 2022	Ten, 40–13
1.	102,321	Southern	Sep. 10, 2022	LSU, 65–17
1.	102,321	Florida	Oct. 12, 2019	LSU, 42–28
1.	102,321	Alabama	Nov. 3, 2018	Ala, 29–0
1.	102,321	Georgia	Oct. 13, 2018	LSU, 36–16
1.	102,321	Louisiana Tech	Sep. 22, 2018	LSU, 38–21
1.	102,321	Alabama	Nov. 5, 2016	Ala, 10–0
1.	102,321	Auburn	Sep. 19, 2015	LSU, 45–21
1.	102,321	Eastern Michigan	Oct. 3, 2015	LSU, 44–22

== Notable events ==
=== LSU football games ===
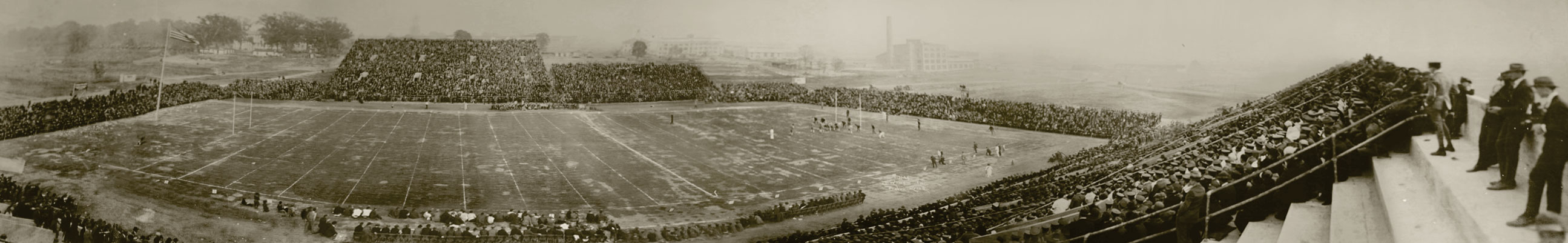
Tiger Stadium opening day 1924

Tiger Stadium first opened its gates to fans in the fall of 1924 as LSU hosted Tulane in the season finale. Since the first game in Tiger Stadium, LSU has gone on to post a 439-154-18 (.733) mark in Death Valley. Moreover, Tiger Stadium is also known for night games, an idea that was first introduced in 1931 against Spring Hill (a 35-0 LSU victory). In 2006, LSU celebrated its 75th year of playing night football in Tiger Stadium. LSU has played the majority of its games at night and the Tigers have fared much better under the lights than during the day. Since 1960, LSU is 201–59–3 (.773) at night in Tiger Stadium compared to a 21–22–3 (.488) record during the day over that span. LSU lost its first Saturday night game since 2009 against Alabama on Saturday November 3, 2012.

- Billy Cannon's Halloween Run on a punt-return for a touchdown in 1959 when top-ranked LSU scored late and stopped #3 Ole Miss at the goal line to win by a score of 7–3.
- The last-second Bert Jones touchdown pass in 1972 against Ole Miss. LSU was down 16–10 with four seconds left in the game when Jones made an incomplete pass. At the end of the play, fans looked at the clock which surprisingly showed one second remaining. LSU used the last second of the game for a touchdown pass from Bert Jones to Brad Davis. According to Ole Miss lore, a sign was put up at the Louisiana–Mississippi border reading "You are now entering Louisiana. Set your clocks back four seconds.";
- Tiger Stadium was the site of the legendary "Earthquake Game" against Auburn in 1988. LSU won the game 7–6 when quarterback Tommy Hodson completed a game-winning touchdown pass to running back Eddie Fuller in the waning seconds of the game. The crowd reaction registered as a legitimate earthquake on the seismograph in the Louisiana Geological Survey office on campus.
- On October 11, 1997, #14 LSU upset top-ranked Florida with a 28–21 victory.
- On October 6, 2007, in a sellout Saturday night game in Tiger Stadium on a national television broadcast (CBS), #1 LSU beat #9 Florida with a 28–24 victory. During the game, LSU set a stadium noise record with 130 decibels.

=== Grantland Rice Bowl ===
In 1974 and 1975 the NCAA Division II Grantland Rice Bowl was held in Tiger Stadium.

=== National High School Football Championship ===
On December 31, 1938, the first national championship for High School football was played at Tiger Stadium. While other schools had been previously awarded the title of High School Football National Championship, this was the first time the game was played in Louisiana. At the time, Louisiana Governor Richard Leche had expressed a desire to see a championship game played in Louisiana. The Louisiana Sports Association subsequently sponsored the contest. In the game, Dupont Manual High School of Louisville, Kentucky, defeated New Britain High School of Connecticut by a score of 28-20.

=== Entertainment at Tiger Stadium ===
Inauguration party

Governor Edwin W. Edwards hosted a free public party at the stadium on May 9, 1972, the day of his inauguration for the first of his four terms as governor.

Bayou Country Superfest
From 2010 to 2016, Bayou Country Superfest is held each Memorial Day weekend. The concerts were moved to the Mercedes-Benz Superdome in 2017 and 2018 due to renovations at Tiger Stadium.

Notable concerts

Date	Artist	Opening act(s)	Tour / Concert name	Attendance	Revenue	Notes
May 22, 2015	Taylor Swift	Vance Joy; Shawn Mendes	The 1989 World Tour	50,227 / 50,227	$4,119,670	
May 24, 2015	Miranda Lambert	—	Platinum Tour	—	—	
May 27, 2016	Luke Bryan	—	Kill the Lights Tour	—	—	
April 30, 2022	Garth Brooks	Mitch Rossell	The Garth Brooks Stadium Tour	102,000	—	

== Unique features ==
- Student dormitories were built into the stadium in 1931. Athletic Director T.P. "Skipper" Heard learned that LSU president James M. Smith had $250,000 earmarked for dormitories. Heard sold Smith on the idea that the president could have his dormitories simply by raising the stands on both sides of the stadium and extending them to each goal line. This not only enabled the dormitories to be built underneath the stands, but it also expanded the stadium by 10,000 seats from 12,000 to 22,000. The dormitories were inhabited until the early 1990s and were used for offices and storage until some time in the 2010s.
- Unlike most football fields, where only the yard markers in 10-yard increments are marked, Tiger Stadium also marks the yard lines in five-yard intervals. Some NFL stadiums marked lines every 5 yards until it was banned in 1972.
- Another difference in the field marking is at the 20-yard lines. Tiger Stadium adds purple and yellow borders on the outside of the full length of the lines. These extra details are not done at most other stadiums at any level, especially since the changes to the touchback rule in the 2010s and 2020s.
- LSU's Tiger Stadium uniquely sports "H" style (or "offset") goal posts, as opposed to the more modern "Y" ("slingshot" or "tuning fork") style used by other schools today, although they are not the true "H" goal posts which were once ubiquitous on American football fields, since the posts are behind the uprights and connected to the uprights by curved bars. This "H" style allows the team to run through the goal post in the north end zone when entering the field. Tiger Stadium is one of only three Division I Football Bowl Subdivision (FBS) schools in the nation whose stadium still uses the H style goal posts. The only other FBS stadiums that use goalposts with two posts all season are Doak Campbell Stadium at Florida State and Martin Stadium at Washington State. Many other schools use the two post goals during rivalry games only to prevent them from being torn down in victory, a real safety concern in recent years. They received special permission from the NCAA prior to the November 20, 1993, game against Tulane in conjunction with LSU's football centennial; NCAA rules have since changed to permit the use of two uprights full-time. These goal posts remained intact for the four New Orleans Saints games held in 2005, with dispensation from the NFL. Under NFL rules in place since 1967, goalposts for NFL games must be slingshot style and bright gold in color. Tiger Stadium's goalposts are white with the then-NFL-standard 30-foot uprights (the NFL raised the height of the uprights to 35 feet for 2014). Many schools' uprights are the NCAA-minimum 20 feet high. (LSU used the NFL-style goalposts from 1985 through the first four home games of 1993.)
  - The goalposts at the north end of the stadium were torn down by students in 1997 vs. Florida, and again in 2000 vs. Tennessee and Alabama. The posts have not been torn down since, although fans rushed the field following victories vs. Ole Miss in 2014, Georgia in 2018, twice in 2022 vs Ole Miss and Alabama, and 2024 vs. Ole Miss. LSU was fined $5,000 by the SEC in 2014 and $100,000 four years later. Each field invasion in 2022 cost LSU $250,000. Per SEC regulations adopted by the conference in May 2023, any subsequent invasion of the playing field (or the court in the Pete Maravich Assembly Center or the field at Alex Box Stadium) will cost LSU $100,000 for a first offense, $250,000 for a second, and $500,000 for each offense thereafter (the SEC expunged all 14 schools' records with the adoption of the new fine schedule; there are no monetary penalties for field/court storming in the Big 12 Conference, where Missouri, Oklahoma, Texas and Texas A&M competed prior to joining the SEC). The 2024 field storming cost LSU $250,000 since it was the school's second offense under the new fine structure; the first came earlier in 2024 after a men's basketball victory vs. Kentucky.
- The crossbar from the goalposts which stood in the north end zone of Tiger Stadium from 1955 through 1984 is now mounted above the door which leads from LSU's locker room onto the playing field. The crossbar is painted with the word "WIN!", and superstition dictates every player entering the field touch the bar on his way out the door.
- At the beginning of the 2009 season LSU unveiled a 27 X 80 Daktronics HD video Board. The $3.1-million display is situated in the North end zone and features (on the front) the phrase "Welcome to Death Valley" (the stadium's well-known moniker). This scoreboard received a makeover in 2014 with the opening of the new South Endzone Upper Deck. The lettering of the phrase "Welcome to Death Valley" that adorns the front of the deck was also enlarged.
- There are two new HD video boards in the new South Endzone Upper Deck situated in each corner that were both installed in 2014.
- The SEC lifted its ban on stadium-wide alcohol sales in the Spring of 2019. Starting with the 2019 football season, LSU began selling beer and wine across Tiger Stadium. Sales stop at the end of the third quarter, and alcohol is not sold at the concession stands closest to the student section. Other regulations are in place to ensure the safety of fans, such as the dispensing of all beverages in plastic containers. Previously, LSU could sell alcohol in Tiger Stadium only in “premium” areas such as the Stadium Clubs and the Skyline Club.

== Facilities ==
=== Jeff Boss Locker Room ===
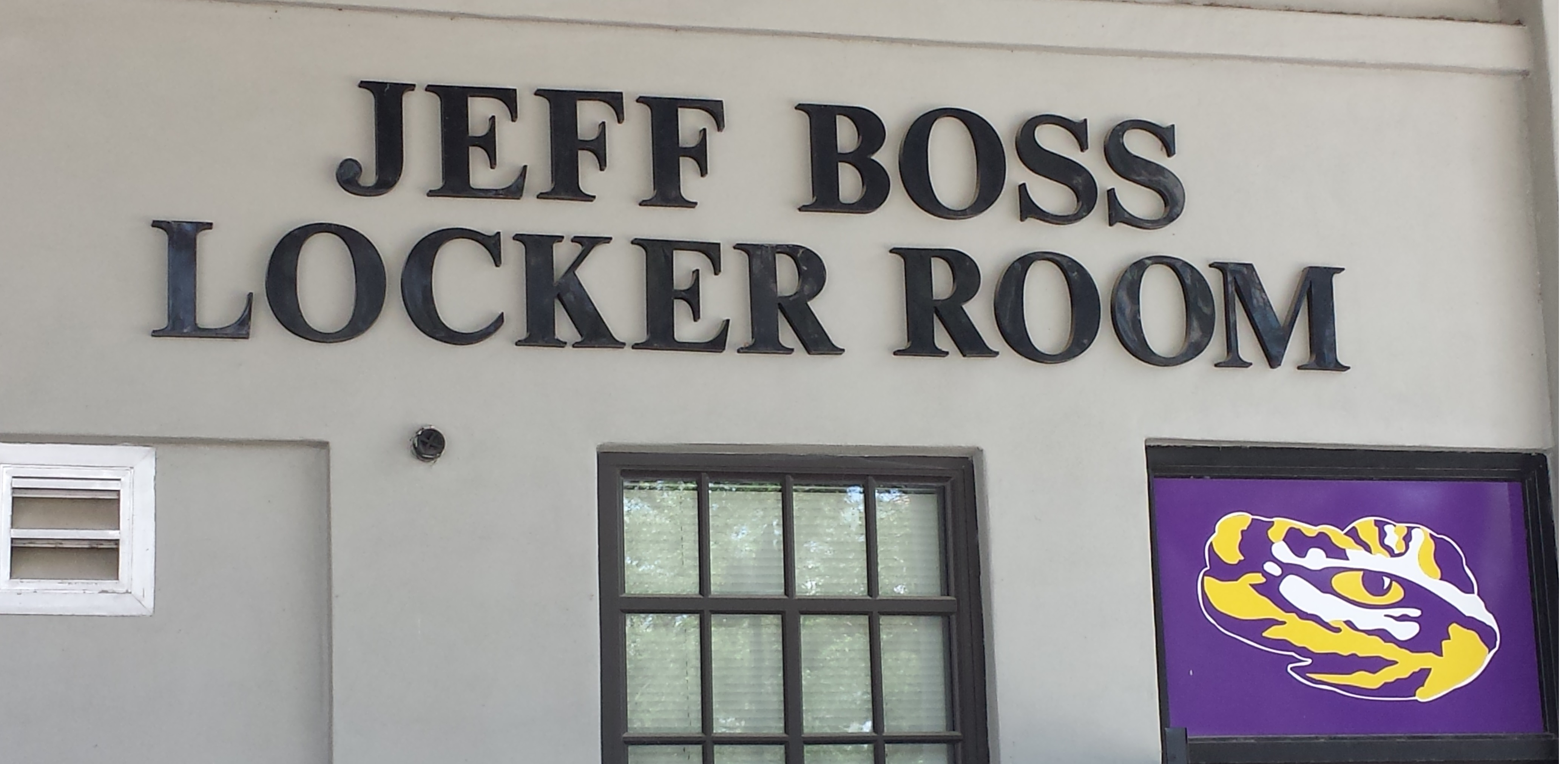
Jeff Boss Locker Room

The Jeff Boss Locker Room located in Tiger Stadium is 8,000 square feet (740 m^{2}) and houses 126 lockers with LED lighting. It includes a state-of-the-art sound system, HDTVs, illustrative team graphics and a lighting system. The locker room area includes the main locker room, coaches lounge w/ lockers and a private lounge for the head coach. There is also an area dedicated to LSU's first round NFL Draft picks, a wall listing every Tiger that has been active for an NFL game, plus a list of LSU's all-time graduates. It was renovated prior to the 2014 football season and was previously renovated for the 1996 season.

The LSU Tigers football locker room in Tiger Stadium is named in honor of equipment manager, Jeff Boss. He was equipment manager for the LSU Tigers football team for 24 years from 1980 to 2003. The locker room was named after Boss on September 29, 2003. Boss died from cancer on October 27, 2003, and the Tigers honored him the remainder of the season with his initials inside a black square on the left side of their jerseys and the back of their helmets.

=== LSU Strength and Conditioning facility ===
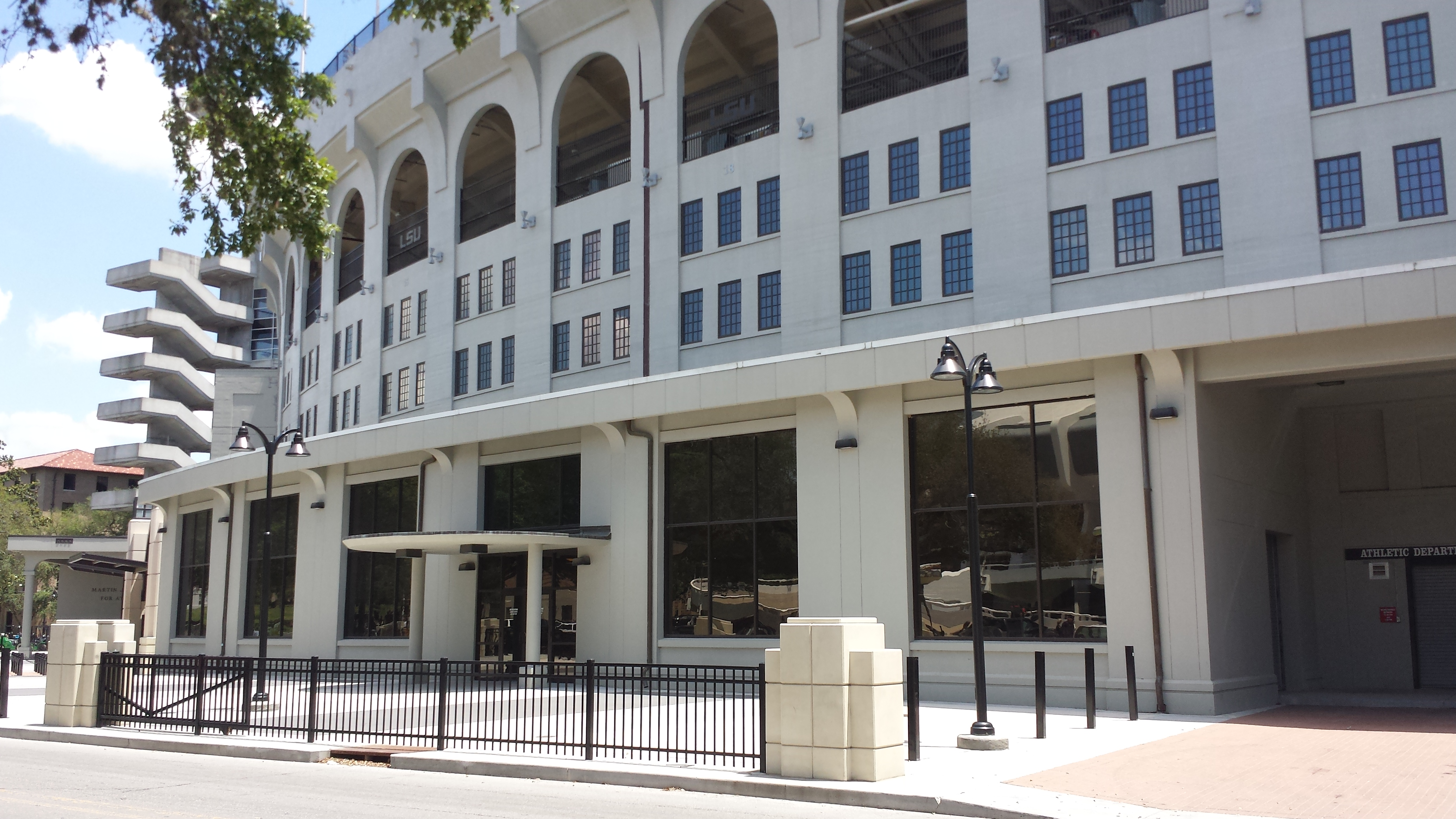
LSU Strength and Conditioning facility

The LSU Strength and Conditioning facility or LSU North Stadium weight room, is a strength training and conditioning facility at Louisiana State University. Built in 1997, it is located adjacent to the stadium. Measuring 10,000 square feet (930 m^{2}) with a flat surface, it has 28 multi-purpose power stations, 36 assorted selectorized machines and 10 dumbbell stations along with a plyometric specific area, medicine balls, hurdles, plyometric boxes and assorted speed and agility equipment. It also features 2 treadmills, 4 stationary bikes, 2 elliptical cross trainers, a stepper and stepmill.

The facility was originally constructed to house all of LSU's sports teams, but is now home to the men's and women's basketball, gymnastics, men's and women's swimming and diving, men's and women's tennis and volleyball teams. The LSU Tigers football strength training and conditioning facility is now located in the LSU Football Operations Center, where the baseball and softball teams also train, since it is closer to the baseball and softball facilities at the southwestern edge of campus.

== Hurricane Katrina ==
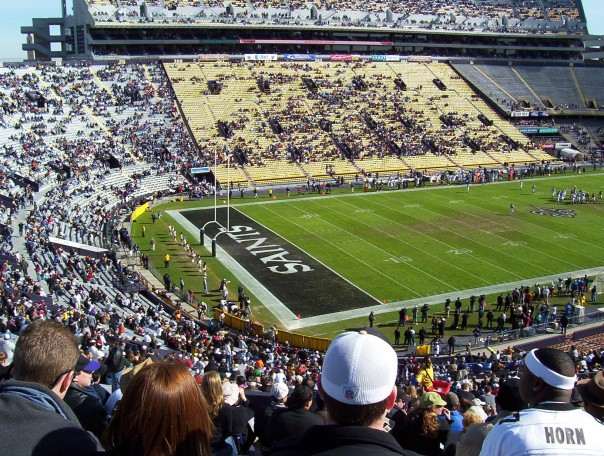
Tiger Stadium – Branded for the New Orleans Saints

Tiger Stadium at LSU served as a temporary relocation site for the New Orleans Saints for four games of the 2005 NFL season after Hurricane Katrina damaged the Superdome and left much of New Orleans under water. The Saints, however, utilized only 79,000 of Tiger Stadium's seats (the new west side upper deck, which was still under construction, was closed for Saints games). The Saints' first two games in Baton Rouge came on the Sunday immediately following an LSU home game, meaning field crews had to repaint the field to NFL standards immediately following the completion of LSU's games, both of which kicked off at 7 p.m. Due to the time crunch, the NFL granted LSU's request to start the Saints' games in the late slot (3:05 p.m. CST). Although none of the Saints' four Baton Rouge dates sold out due to the effects of Hurricane Katrina, the NFL exempted the Saints from the league's blackout rules, and the games were televised locally by WAFB and WGMB, and in New Orleans by WWL and WVUE.

The Saints went 0–4 in Tiger Stadium. The first game saw the return of Nick Saban, who led LSU to the national championship two years earlier. Saban's Miami Dolphins defeated the Saints 21–6. The Saints subsequently lost to the Chicago Bears (20–17), Tampa Bay Buccaneers (10–3) and Carolina Panthers (27–10). The Bears, Buccaneers and Panthers all qualified for the NFC playoffs, with the Panthers losing to the Seattle Seahawks in the NFC championship game.

Tiger Stadium also hosted the Tulane Green Wave versus Southeastern Louisiana Lions football game on October 1, 2005, due to Hurricane Katrina. Tulane defeated Southeastern Louisiana 28–21.

In 1967 and 1969, the Saints hosted exhibition games at Tiger Stadium. The 1967 game matched New Orleans vs. the St. Louis Cardinals, which allowed former LSU superstar and future Tiger coach Jerry Stovall, then a Cardinals safety, to return to Baton Rouge. Two years later, the Saints took on the Pittsburgh Steelers, led by future Hall of Fame coach Chuck Noll and defensive tackle Joe Greene, both of whom were in their first season with the Steelers.

The last high school football game in Tiger Stadium was the 1966 Louisiana High School Athletic Association Class AAA championship, at the time Louisiana's highest classification. Local powerhouse Broadmoor defeated South Lafourche of Galliano (where future LSU coach Ed Orgeron played from 1976 to 1978) 24–0.

== Gallery ==
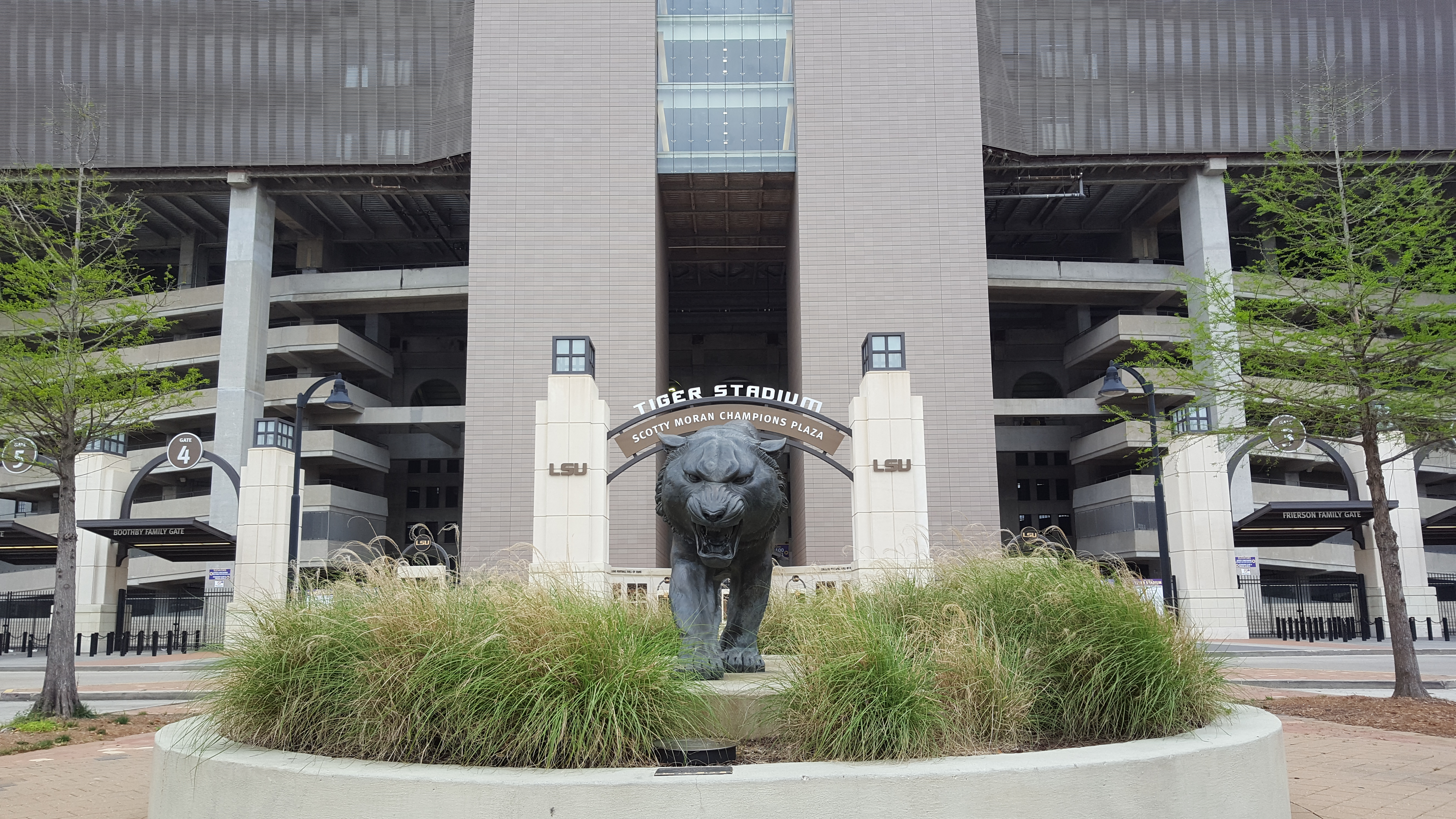
Mike the Tiger in Champions Plaza

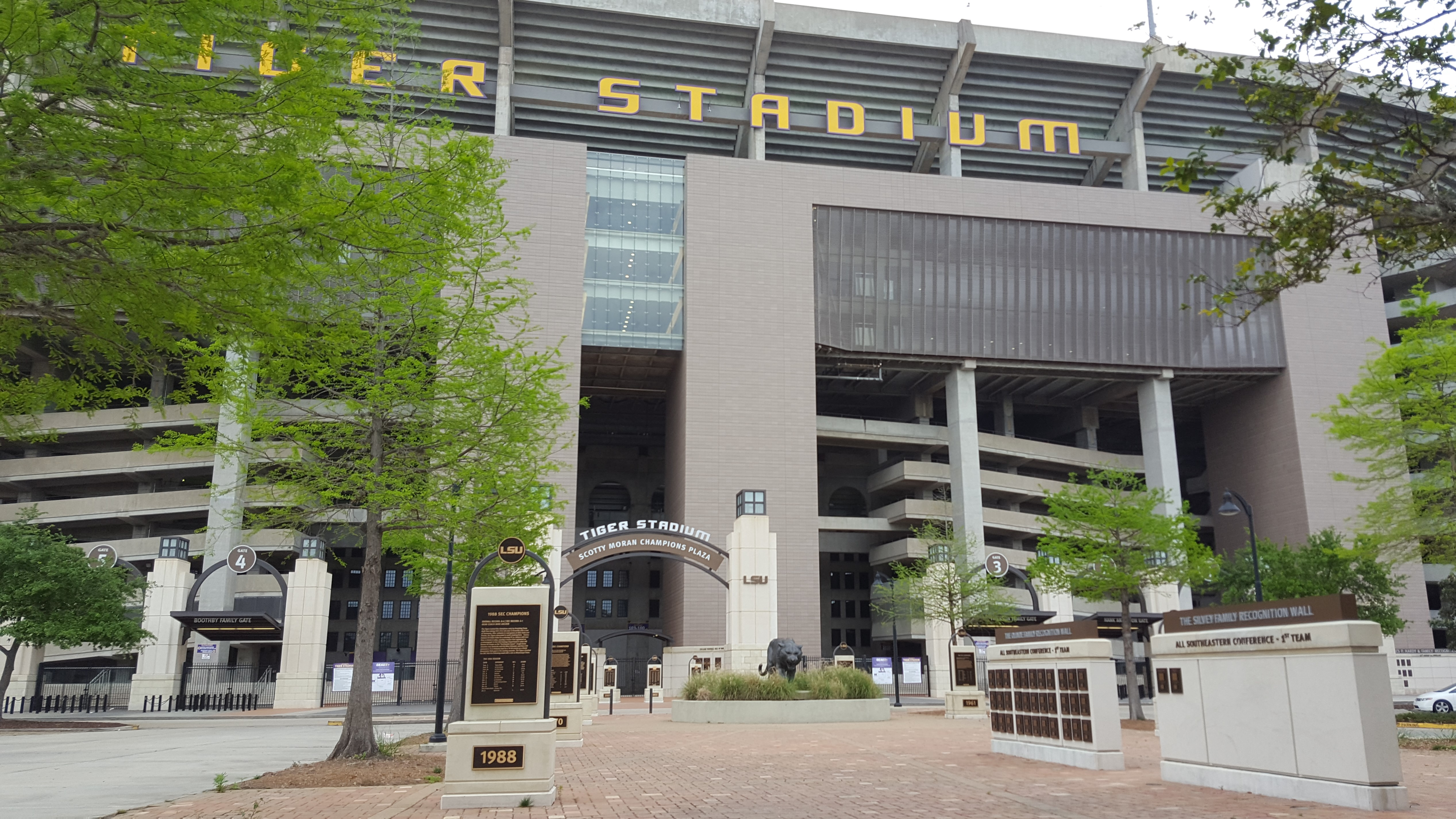
West Side

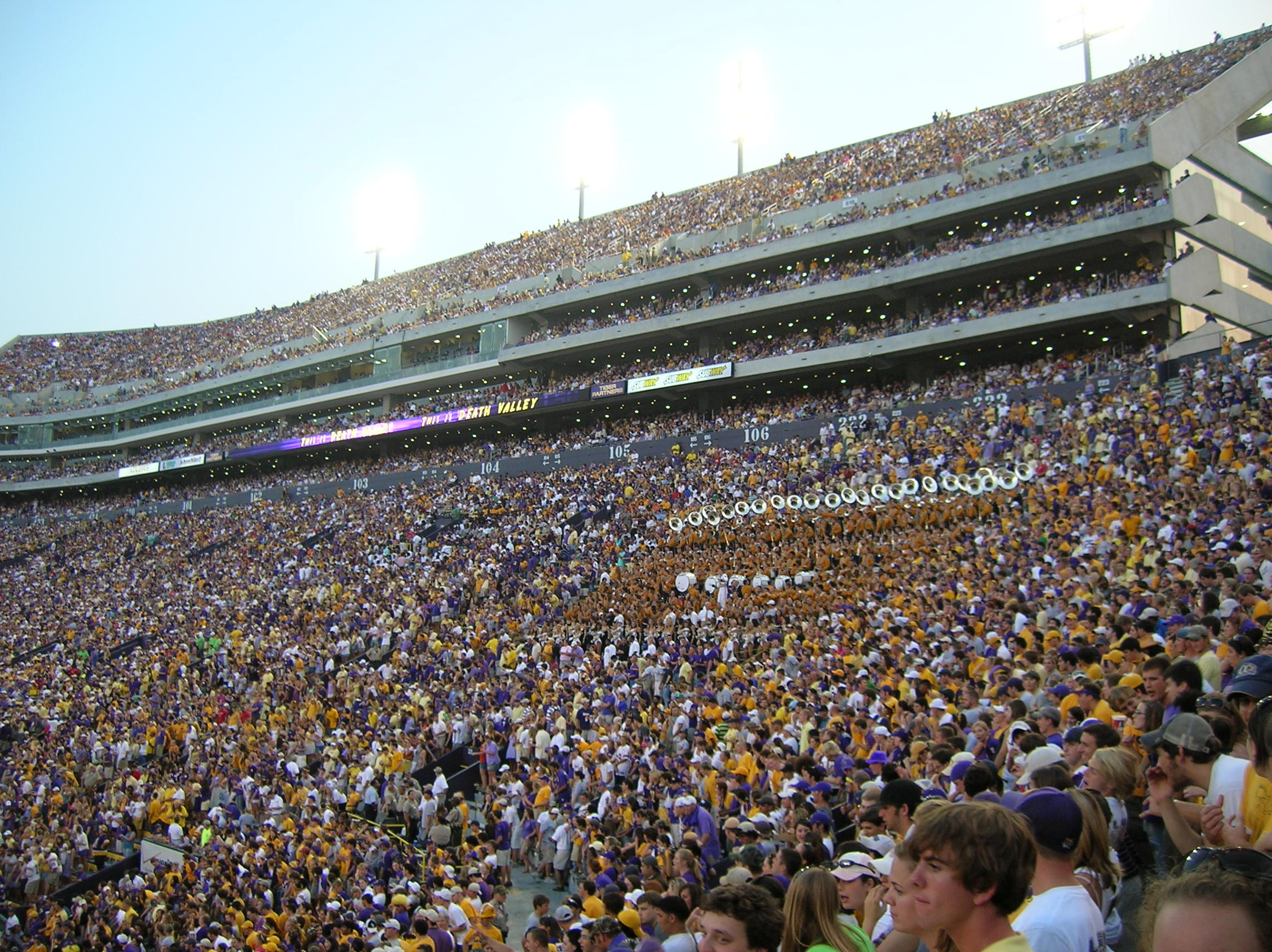
West Side grandstand

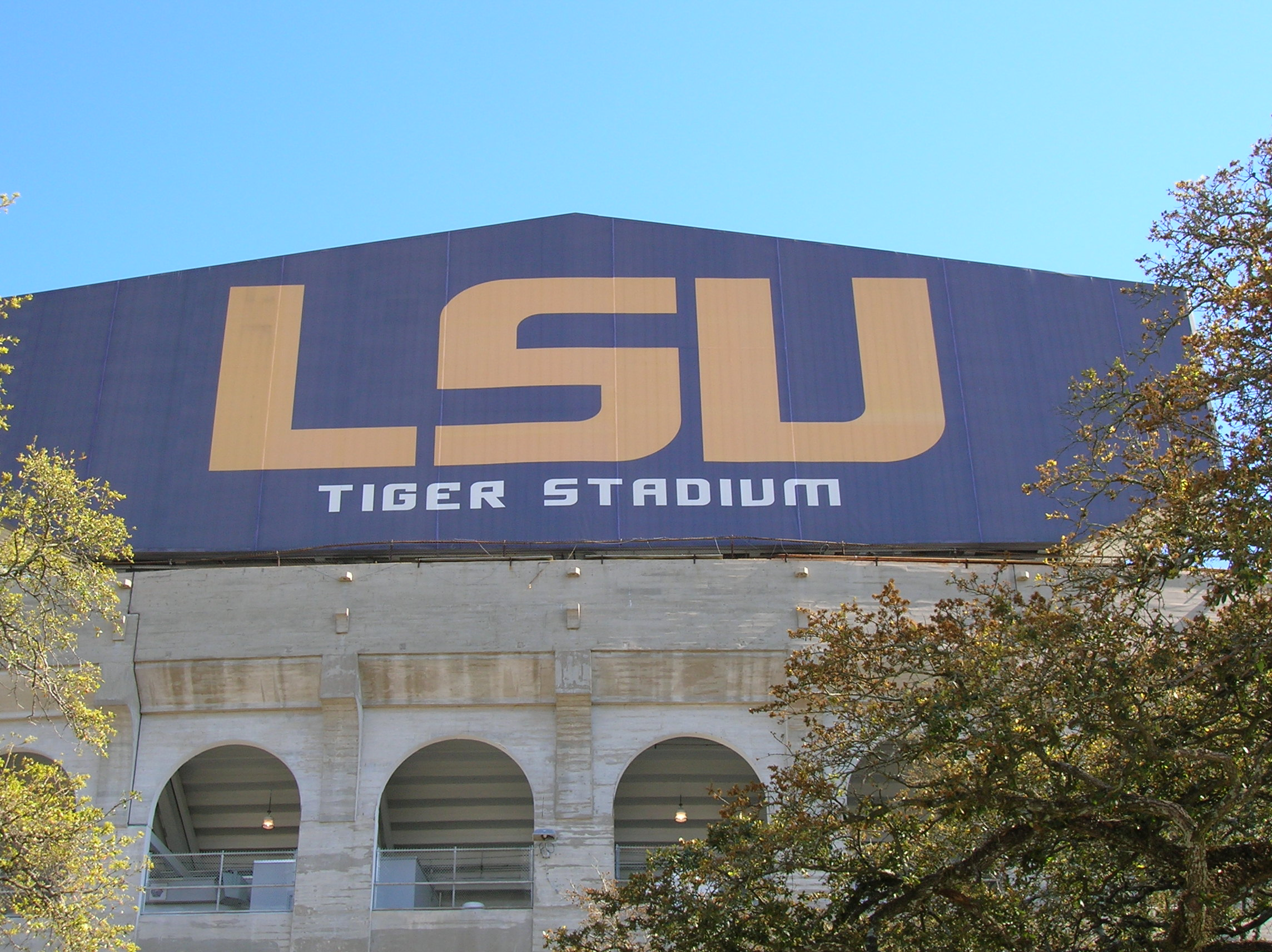
North End Zone scoreboard

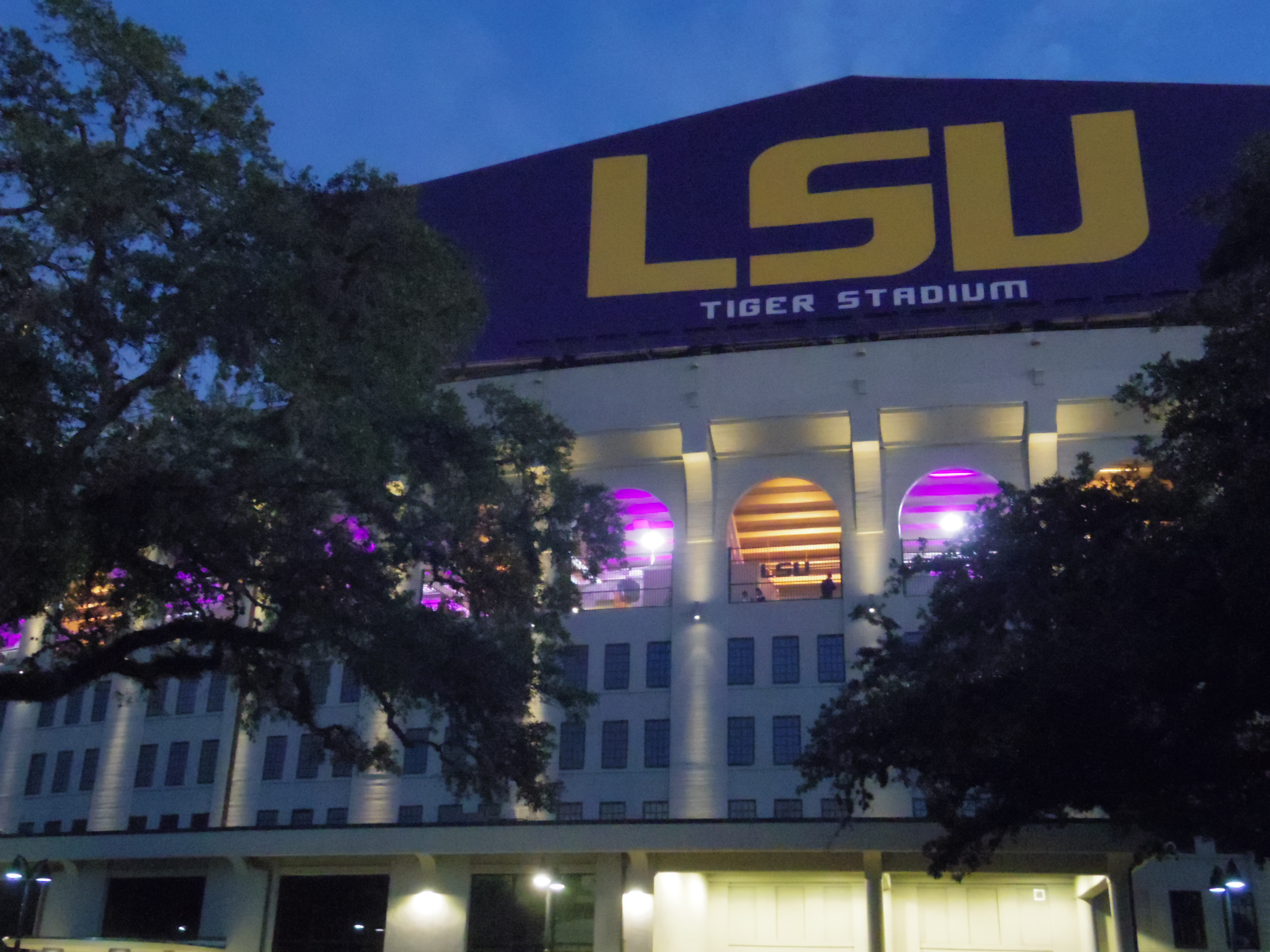
North End Zone scoreboard at night

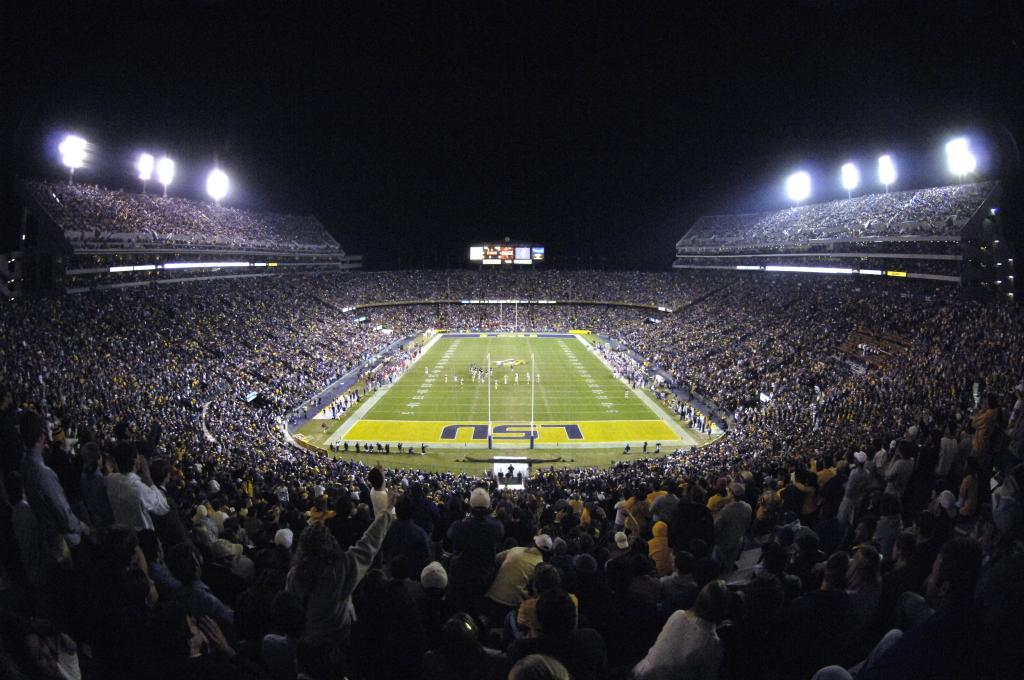
View from North End Zone

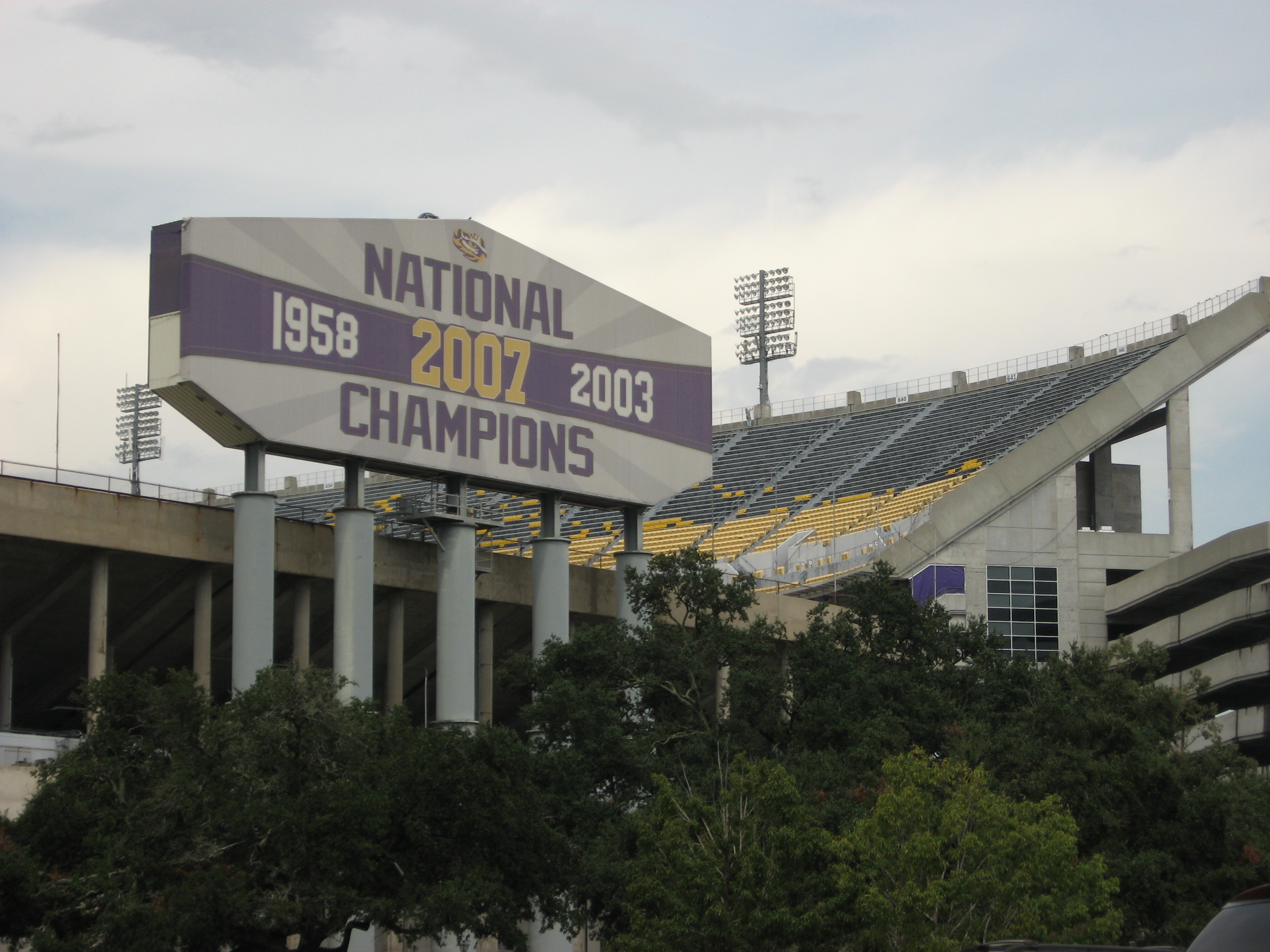
South End Zone scoreboard (Prior to 2014 expansion)

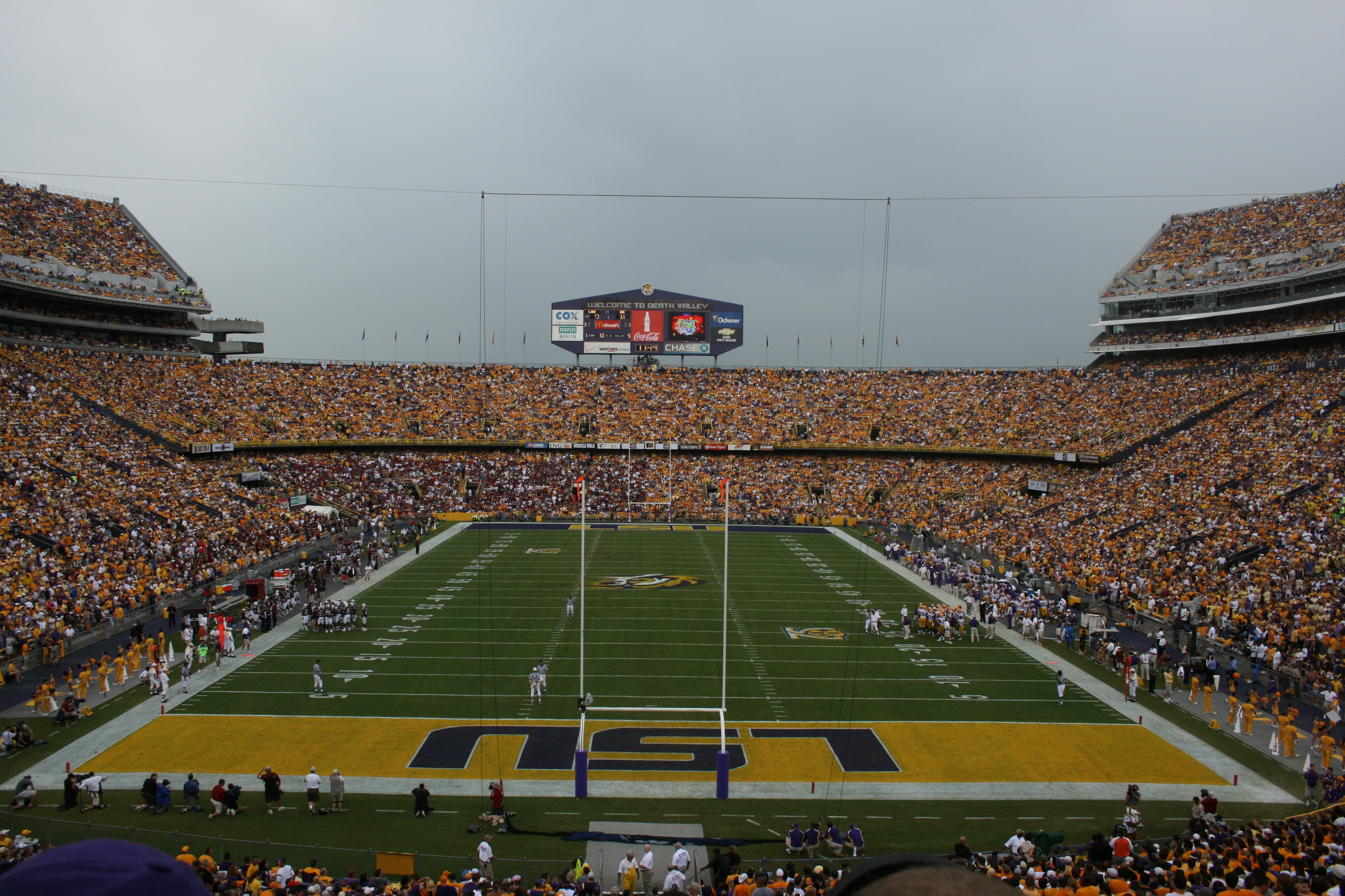
South End Zone (Prior to 2014 expansion)

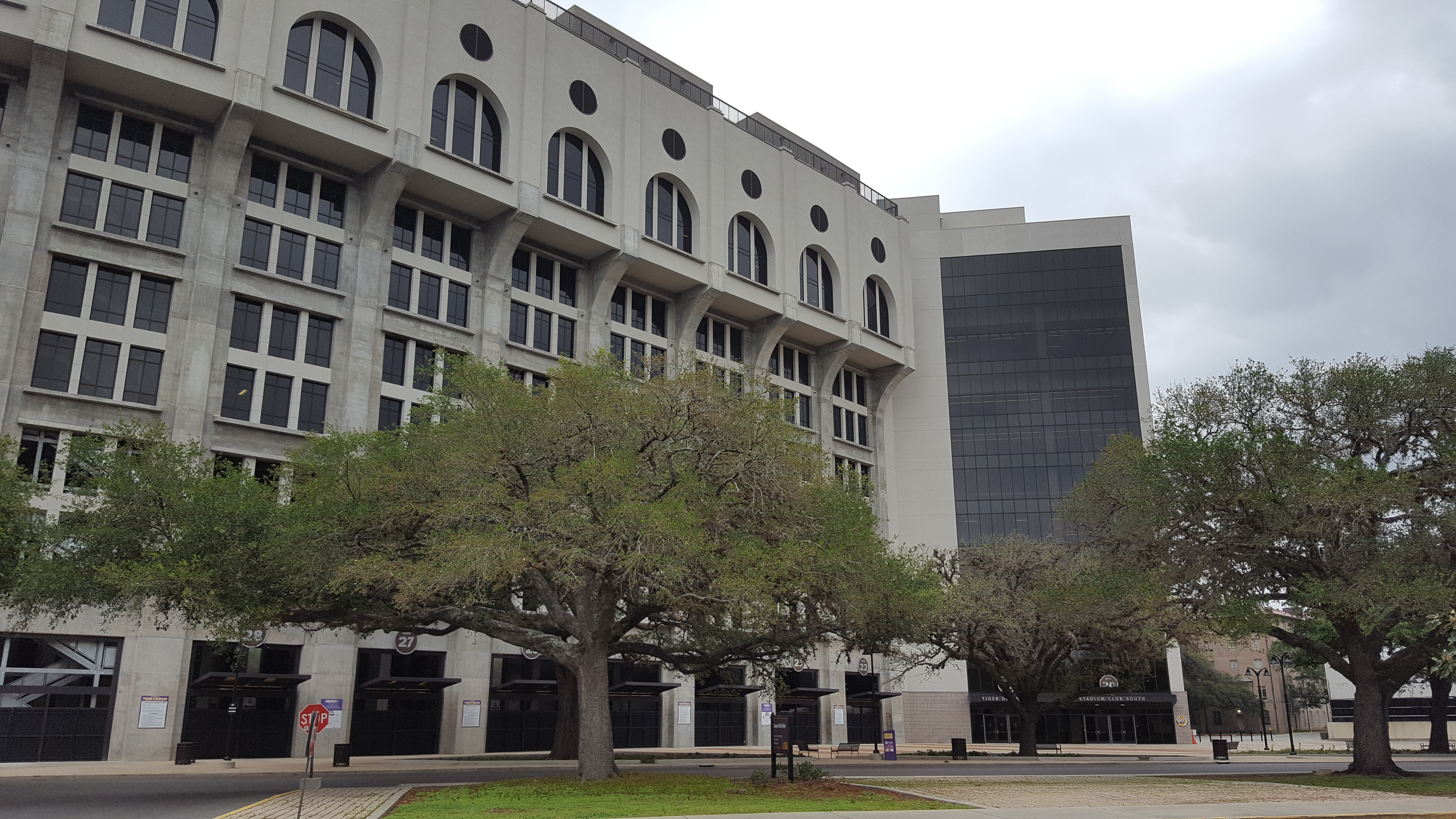
South End Zone expansion exterior

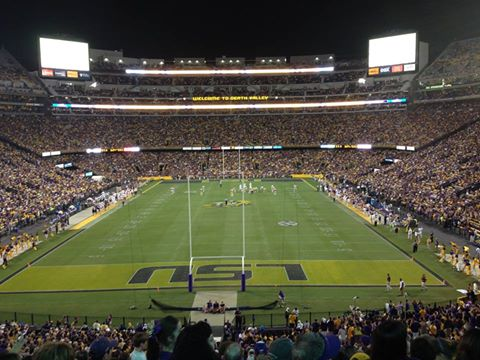
South End Zone expansion interior

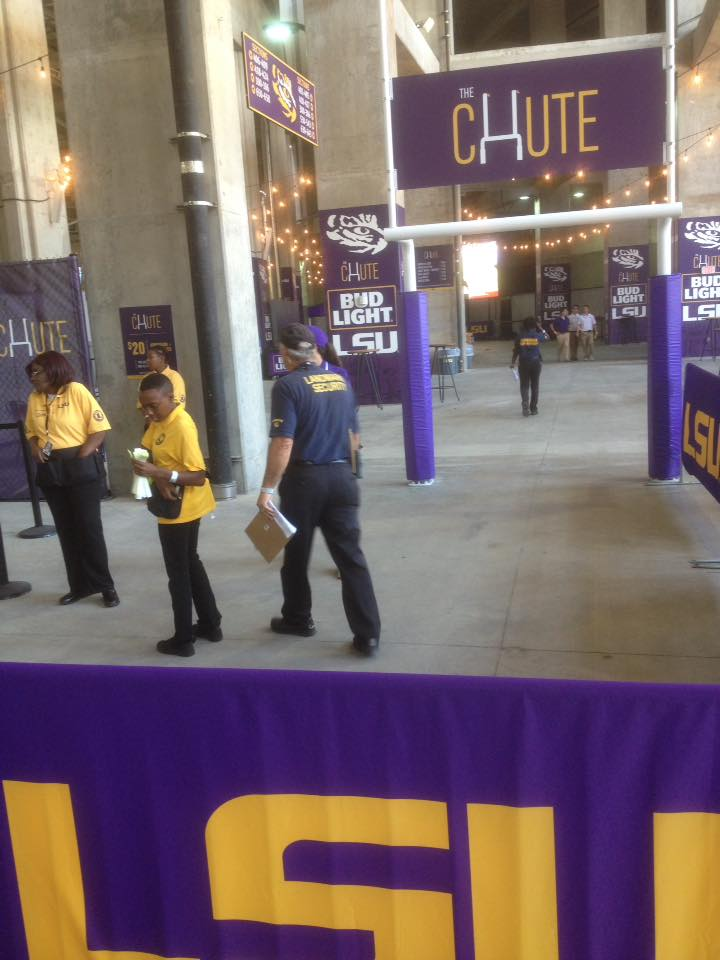
Beer garden

== See also ==
- Charles McClendon Practice Facility
- LSU Football Operations Center
- LSU Indoor Practice Facility
- LSU Tigers football
- LSU Tigers and Lady Tigers
- List of NCAA Division I FBS football stadiums
- List of American football stadiums by capacity
- List of stadiums by capacity
- List of music venues
- Lists of stadiums

Preceded by Louisiana Superdome	Home of the New Orleans Saints (with Giants Stadium & Alamodome); 2005 (4 games)	Succeeded by Louisiana Superdome
