= Joe Alleva =

American athletics director (born c. 1952)

Joseph Louis Alleva (born c. 1952) is the former athletics director at Louisiana State University and Duke University.

== Duke ==
Alleva began as athletic director in 1998. Alleva hired three football coaches in his 11 years: Carl Franks, Ted Roof, and David Cutcliffe. Franks' record in his five years was 7–45, including two 0–11 seasons. Roof went 6–45. Despite an initial preference for former UCLA head coach Karl Dorrell, Alleva eventually settled on Cutcliffe as Roof's replacement. Cutcliffe won ACC Coach of the Year in 2012. His first baseball coach hired was Bill Hillier who compiled a 121–214 record.

In the beginning of the Duke lacrosse case, on April 5, 2006, Joe Alleva forced Duke lacrosse coach Mike Pressler to resign under threat and faced criticism for his handling of the case. In 2008, Alleva announced he was leaving Duke for the athletic director position at Louisiana State University.

== LSU ==
On April 2, 2008, Alleva was named athletic director at Louisiana State University and officially started on July 1, 2008. In 2009, he was named vice chancellor, making it the first time in LSU history the director of athletics has also held a vice chancellor position.

During his tenure at LSU, the University won the 2009 baseball national championship and 2015 men's golf national championship. The athletes at LSU earned 48 individual NCAA championships in the sports of men's and women's track and field, gymnastics, men's golf, women's golf and women’s tennis. LSU captured 18 Southeastern Conference team championships and the Tigers and Lady Tigers won 124 individual SEC titles during Alleva's tenure.

Alleva helped renovate and build multiple athletic facilities at LSU. Tiger Stadium received the installation of 430 new windows. The 2014 Tiger Stadium south end zone expansion and the construction of the LSU Gymnastics Training Facility and the LSU Tennis Complex happened under his watch.

During his tenure at LSU, Alleva came under criticism for the head football coaching search to replace Les Miles. He also received scrutiny for his handling of rescheduling the 2016 LSU–Florida football game due to Hurricane Matthew. Alleva was criticized for his head men's basketball coaching hires prior to the hiring of Will Wade. He also came under fire for his handling of head men's basketball coach Will Wade's suspension at the end of the 2018–19 LSU Tigers men's basketball season. Joe Alleva resigned from his position as LSU's athletic director on April 17, 2019 and was replaced by Scott Woodward. After leaving the athletic director role, Alleva became the special assistant to the president for donor relations at LSU.
