= LSU Indoor Practice Facility =

Sports venue in Baton Rouge, Louisiana

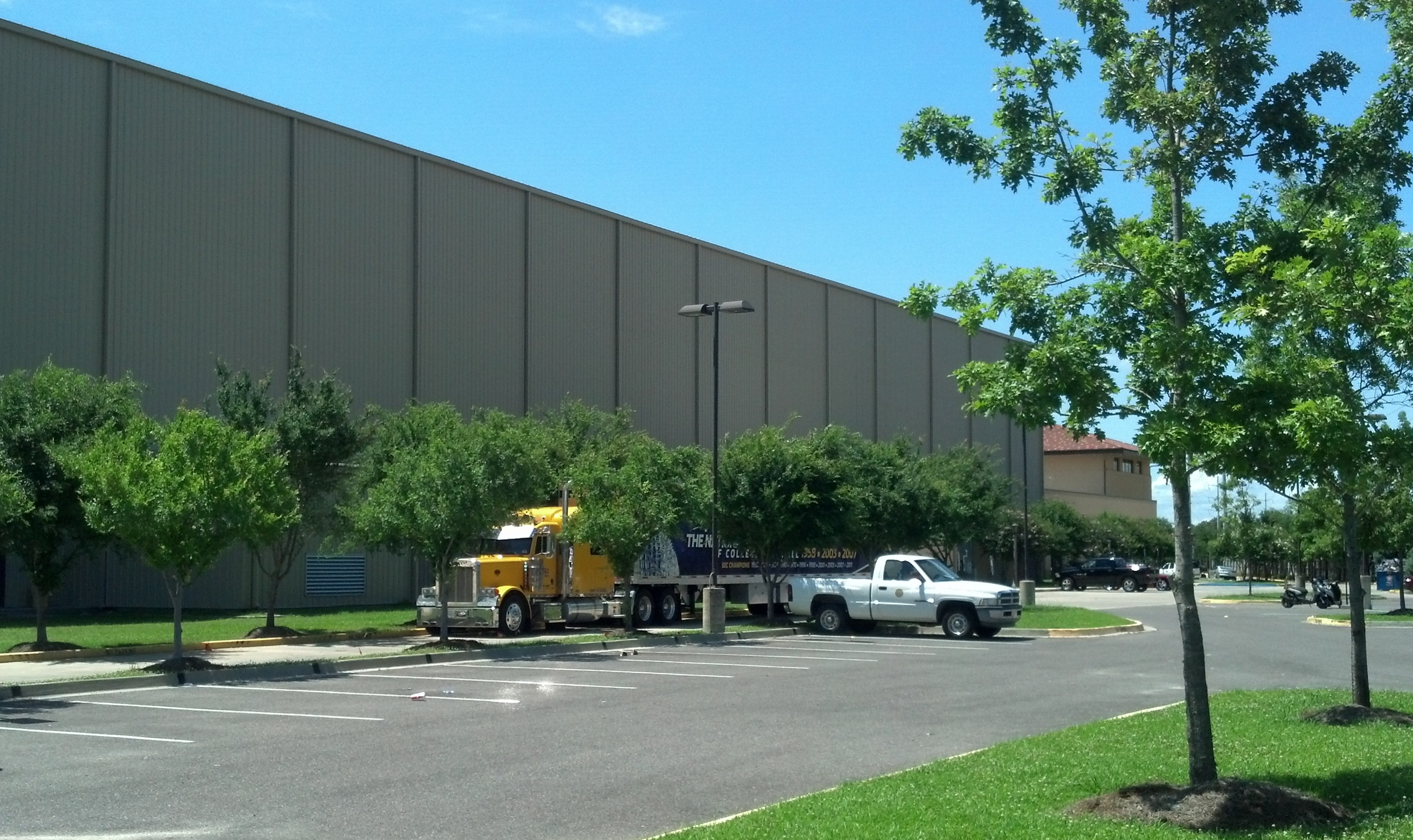
- Interactive map of LSU Indoor Practice Facility
- Location: Skip Bertman Drive; Baton Rouge, Louisiana 70803; USA
- Coordinates: 30.40953°N 91.18867°W
- Owner: Louisiana State University
- Operator: LSU Athletics Department

Construction
- Opened: 1991

Tenant
- LSU Tigers football (NCAA)

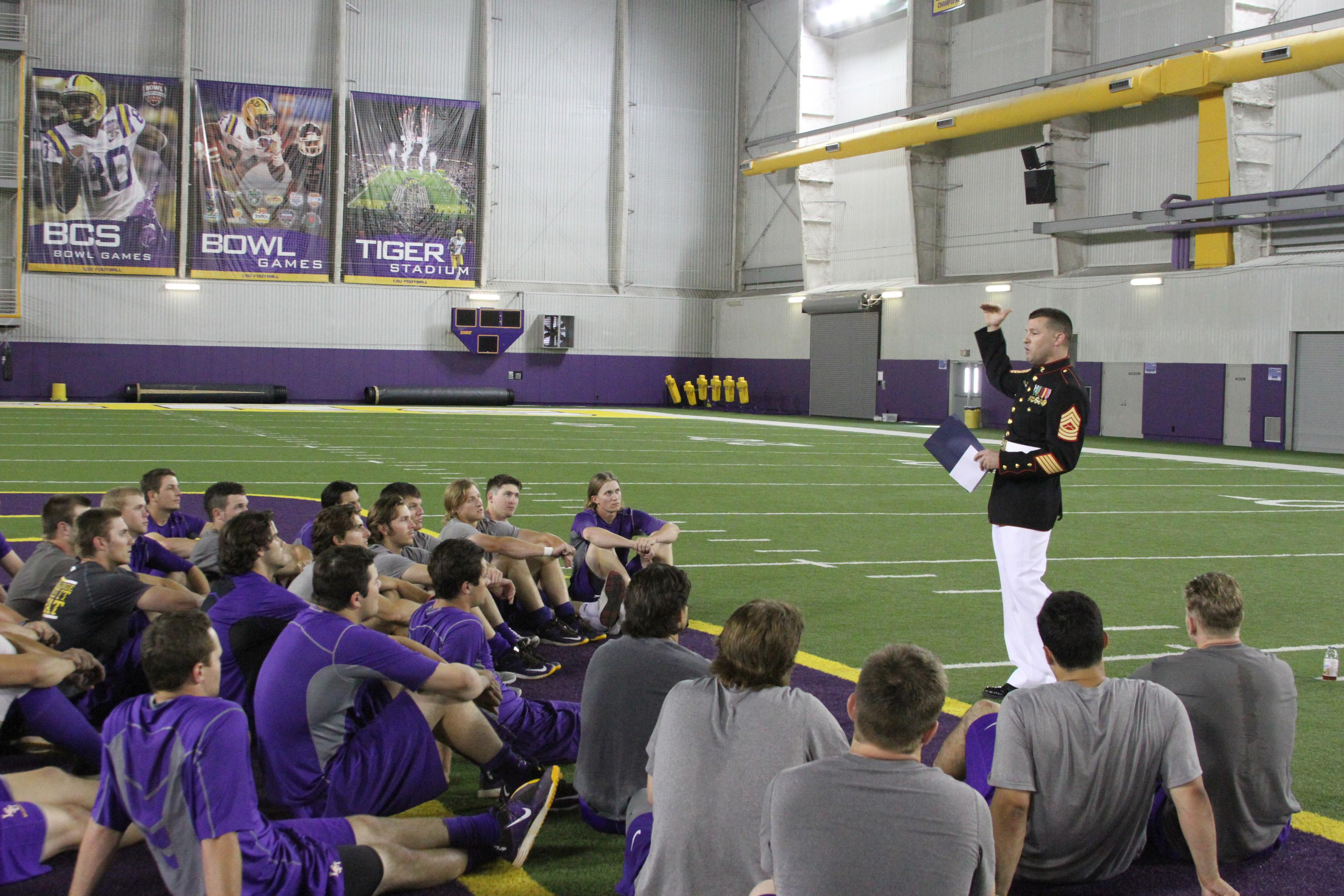
Interior of the LSU Indoor Practice Facility in 2015

The LSU Indoor Practice Facility, built in 1991, is a climate-controlled 83,580 square feet facility connected to the Football Operations Center and adjacent to LSU's four outdoor 100-yard football practice fields. It holds the 100-yd Anderson-Feazel LSU indoor field. The playing surface is Momentum Field Turf by SportExe. The indoor practice facility is adjacent to both the football-only weight room and LSU's four outdoor practice fields. Besides allowing the team and the Tiger Band to practice during inclement weather, the indoor practice facility is used for LSU's summer endurance training and summer football camps.

The LSU Lady Tigers soccer team uses the facility when inclement weather prevents the team from practicing at the LSU Soccer Stadium. LSU's baseball and softball teams also use the facility for fielding and pitching workouts when winter weather is too cold and/or wet.
