= LSU Lady Tigers track and field =

- Founded: 1978
- University: Louisiana State University
- Head coach: Dennis Shaver (20th season)
- Conference: SEC
- Location: Baton Rouge, Louisiana, US
- Indoor track: Carl Maddox Field House (Capacity: 3,000)
- Outdoor track: Bernie Moore Track Stadium (Capacity: 5,680)
- Nickname: Tigers
- Colors: Purple and gold

Conference Indoor Championships
- 1985, 1987, 1988, 1989, 1991, 1993, 1995, 1996, 1998, 1999, 2007, 2008, 2011

Conference Outdoor Championships
- 1985, 1987, 1988, 1989, 1990, 1991, 1993, 1996, 2007, 2008. 2010, 2011, 2012

Women Indoor National Championships
- 1987, 1989, 1991, 1993, 1994, 1995, 1996, 1997, 2002, 2003, 2004

Women Outdoor National Championships
- 1987, 1988, 1989, 1990, 1991, 1992, 1993, 1994, 1995, 1996, 1997, 2000, 2003, 2008

The LSU Lady Tigers track and field team represents Louisiana State University in NCAA Division I women's indoor and outdoor track and field.

== History ==
The Lady Tiger program began in August 1978. The LSU Lady Tigers track and field program is the premier women's track and field program in the NCAA, winning more NCAA championships than any other school in history. The Lady Tigers have won a total of 25 NCAA championships (11 indoor, 14 outdoor). The closest school is Texas with 10 total championships. The Lady Tigers won their first NCAA championship in 1987 under head coach Sam Seemes. The following year Pat Henry took over the program and led the team to an unprecedented 11 straight NCAA outdoor championships, the most consecutive NCAA titles by a women's team in any NCAA sport. In 2004, Dennis Shaver became the LSU Lady Tigers head coach. He coached the team to the 2008 NCAA outdoor championship.

The first Lady Tiger team formed in August 1978 following Title IX mandates. The first meet was an indoor meet on Dec. 9, 1978 at Carl Maddox Field House on the LSU campus. Gold and Silver Olympic medalist Pam Jiles from New Orleans, La. was on the first team. Another notable Lady Tiger was shotputter Donna Brazile also from New Orleans. Other members of the first team were, Stacy Allen, hurdler, from Metairie, La.; Leila Byrne, sprinter; Vicky Dunn, sprinter; Caroline Favorite, sprinter; Lynnette Favorite, sprinter; Joanie Hathorn; Paula Hayden, middle distance/distance, from Adams Massachusetts; Lourdes Maristany, middle distance/distance from New Orleans, La.; Dr. Marguerite Miranne Rosales, middle distance, from New Orleans; La, Donna Otzenberger Kivirauma, middle distance/distance from Baton Rouge, La; Elaine Smith, sprinter; Athena Thomas, sprinter; Carin Thorp, Sprinter; and Lynn Tutzauer, middle distance/distance.

Kimberlyn Duncan became the first from LSU to win The Bowerman, an award that honors collegiate track & field's most outstanding athlete of the year. In 2012, she became the first woman in NCAA Division I history to win back-to-back indoor and outdoor national titles in the 200 meters.

== Team Finishes ==
Year	SEC Indoor	NCAA Indoor	SEC Outdoor	NCAA Outdoor
1981	*	*	7th	dnc
1982	*	*	7th	22nd
1983	*	dnc	6th	24th(t)
1984	6th	dnc	5th	68th
1985	1st	3rd	1st	2nd(t)
1986	2nd	5th	2nd	12th
1987	1st	**1st**	1st	**1st**
1988	1st	6th	1st	**1st**
1989	1st	**1st**	1st	**1st**
1990	2nd	11th	1st	**1st**
1991	1st	**1st**	1st	**1st**
1992	2nd	4th(t)	2nd	**1st**
1993	1st	**1st**	1st	**1st**
1994	2nd	**1st**	2nd	**1st**
1995	1st	**1st**	2nd	**1st**
1996	1st	**1st**	1st	**1st**
1997	2nd	**1st**	2nd	**1st**
1998	1st	2nd	5th	22nd(t)
1999	1st	2nd	3rd	5th
2000	4th	4th	3rd	**1st**
2001	4th	14th	4th	6th
2002	3rd	**1st**	4th	4th
2003	4th	**1st**	3rd	**1st**
2004	3rd	**1st**	2nd	2nd
2005	3rd	6th(t)	6th	24th(t)
2006	7th	7th	4th	7th(t)
2007	1st	2nd	1st	2nd
2008	1st	2nd	1st	**1st**
2009	2nd	6th	2nd	6th
2010	3rd	3rd	1st	6th
2011	1st	3rd	1st	3rd
2012	2nd	3rd	1st	**1st-Vacated**
2013	2nd	3rd	2nd	4th
2014	6th	12th(t)	8th	6th
2015	5th	9th	4th	11th
2016	2nd	14th(t)	5th	6th
2017	2nd	6th	2nd	7th(t)
2018	4th	6th	2nd	6th
2019	5th	15th(t)	5th	3rd

- **Bold** indicates NCAA national championship

== NCAA championships ==
=== Event ===
==== Indoor ====
Year	Event	Athlete(s)
1985	1,000 Meters	Christine Slythe
1987	4x400 Relay	Sylvia Brydson, Wendy Truvillion, Schowonda Williams, Danyel Wofford
1987	Long Jump	Sheila Echols
1989	4x400 Relay	Sylvia Brydson, Opal Cunningham, Dawn Sowell, Cheryl Wilson
1989	55 Meters	Dawn Sowell
1989	200 Meters	Dawn Sowell
1989	55 Hurdles	Tananjalyn Stanley
1991	55 Hurdles	Mary Cobb
1993	4x400 Relay	Dahlia Duhaney, Indira Hamilton, Heather Van Norman, Youlanda Warren
1993	Shot Put	Danyel Mitchell
1993	Long Jump	Daphnie Saunders
1994	Long Jump	Daphnie Saunders
1995	400 Meters	Youlanda Warren
1996	4x400 Relay	Charlene Maulseed, Sheila Powell, LaTarsha Stroman, Astia Walker
1996	55 Meters	D'Andre Hill
1996	55 Hurdles	Kim Carson
1997	Triple Jump	Suzette Lee
1997	400 Meters	LaTarsha Stroman
1998	55 Meters	Kwajalein Butler
1999	60 Hurdles	Joyce Bates
1999	200 Meters	Peta-Gaye Dowdie
2000	Triple Jump	Keisha Spencer
2002	800 Meters	Marian Burnett
2002	200 Meters	Muna Lee
2002	Triple Jump	Nicole Toney
2003	60 Hurdles	Lolo Jones
2003	60 Meters	Muna Lee
2003	200 Meters	Muna Lee
2004	60 Meters	Muna Lee
2006	4x400 Relay	Juanita Broaddus, Deonna Lawrence, Brooklynn Morris, Cynetheia Rooks
2008	4x400 Relay	Deonna Lawrence, Brooklynn Morris, LaTavia Thomas, Nickiesha Wilson
2008	60 Meters	Kelly-Ann Baptiste
2008	800 Meters	LaTavia Thomas
2011	200 Meters	Kimberlyn Duncan
2012	4x400 Relay	Rebecca Alexander, Jonique Day, Siedda Herbert, Cassandra Tate
2012	200 Meters	Kimberlyn Duncan
2013	200 Meters	Kimberlyn Duncan
2013	800 Meters	Natoya Goule
2018	60 Meters	Aleia Hobbs

==== Outdoor ====
Year	Event	Athlete(s)
1985	4x100 Relay	Sheila Echols, Michelle King, Michele Morris, Angela Phipps
1985	4x400 Relay	Camille Cato, Michele Morris, Wendy Truvillion, Schowonda Williams
1987	Long Jump	Sheila Echols
1987	Javelin	Laverne Eve
1988	400 Hurdles	Schowonda Williams
1989	4x100 Relay	Esther Jones, Cinnamon Sheffield, Dawn Sowell, Tananjalyn Stanley
1989	100 Meters	Dawn Sowell
1989	200 Meters	Dawn Sowell
1989	100 Hurdles	Tananjalyn Stanley
1990	4x100 Relay	Dawn Bowles, Esther Jones, Cinnamon Sheffield, Tananjalyn Stanley
1990	100 Meters	Esther Jones
1990	200 Meters	Esther Jones
1991	100 Hurdles	Dawn Bowles
1991	Heptathlon	Sharon Jaklofsky
1992	4x100 Relay	Dawn Bowles, Dahlia Duhaney, Cinnamon Sheffield, Cheryl Taplin
1992	200 Meters	Dahlia Duhaney
1993	4x100 Relay	Debbie Parris, Cheryl Taplin, Heather Van Norman, Youlanda Warren
1993	4x400 Relay	Indira Hamilton, Debbie Parris, Heather Van Norman, Youlanda Warren
1993	Discus	Danyel Mitchell
1993	400 Hurdles	Debbie Parris
1993	Long Jump	Daphnie Saunders
1994	4x100 Relay	Zundra Feagin, D'Andre Hill, Debbie Parris, Cheryl Taplin
1994	400 Hurdles	Debbie Parris
1994	High Jump	Gai Kapernick
1994	Discus	Danyel Mitchell
1995	4x100 Relay	Kwajalein Butler, Zundra Feagin, D'Andre Hill, Marita Hunt
1995	4x400 Relay	Charlene Maulseed, Sheila Powell, LaTarsha Stroman, Youlanda Warren
1995	100 Meters	D'Andre Hill
1996	4x100 Relay	Kwajalein Butler, Zundra Feagin, D'Andre Hill, Astia Walker
1996	100 Hurdles	Kim Carson
1996	200 Meters	Zundra Feagin
1996	Triple Jump	Suzette Lee
1997	4x100 Relay	Kwajalein Butler, Peta-Gaye Dowdie, Sa'Donna Thornton, Astia Walker
1997	100 Hurdles	Astia Walker
1997	400 Meters	LaTarsha Stroman
1997	Triple Jump	Suzette Lee
1999	800 Meters	Claudine Williams
2000	100 Hurdles	Joyce Bates
2000	200 Meters	Peta-Gaye Dowdie
2000	Triple Jump	Keisha Spencer
2001	4x100 Relay	Myra Combs, Stephanie Durst, Muna Lee, Sa'Donna Thornton
2003	4x100 Relay	Stephanie Durst, Monique Hall, Lolo Jones, Muna Lee
2004	4x100 Relay	Stephanie Durst, Monique Hall, Lolo Jones, Muna Lee
2004	4x400 Relay	Neisha Bernard-Thomas, Nadia Davy, Monique Hall, Hazelann Regis
2004	800 Meters	Neisha Bernard-Thomas
2006	4x400 Relay	Meisue Francis, Deonna Lawrence, Brooklynn Morris, Cynetheia Rooks
2007	4x400 Relay	Deonna Lawrence, Cynetheia Rooks, LaTavia Thomas, Nickiesha Wilson
2007	100 Meters	Sherry Fletcher
2008	100 Meters	Kelly-Ann Baptiste
2008	400 Hurdles	Nickiesha Wilson
2011	4x100 Relay	Rebecca Alexander, Kimberlyn Duncan, Semoy Hackett, Kenyanna Wilson
2011	200 Meters	Kimberlyn Duncan
2012	200 Meters	Kimberlyn Duncan
2012	400 Hurdles	Cassandra Tate
2013	200 Meters	Kimberlyn Duncan
2013	800 Meters	Natoya Goule
2016	4x100 Relay	Mikiah Brisco, Kortnei Johnson, Jada Martin, Rushell Harvey
2017	100 Meters	Mikiah Brisco
2018	100 Meters	Aleia Hobbs
2018	4x100 Relay	Mikiah Brisco, Kortnei Johnson, Rachel Misher, Aleia Hobbs
2019	100 Meters	Sha'Carri Richardson

== Stadiums ==
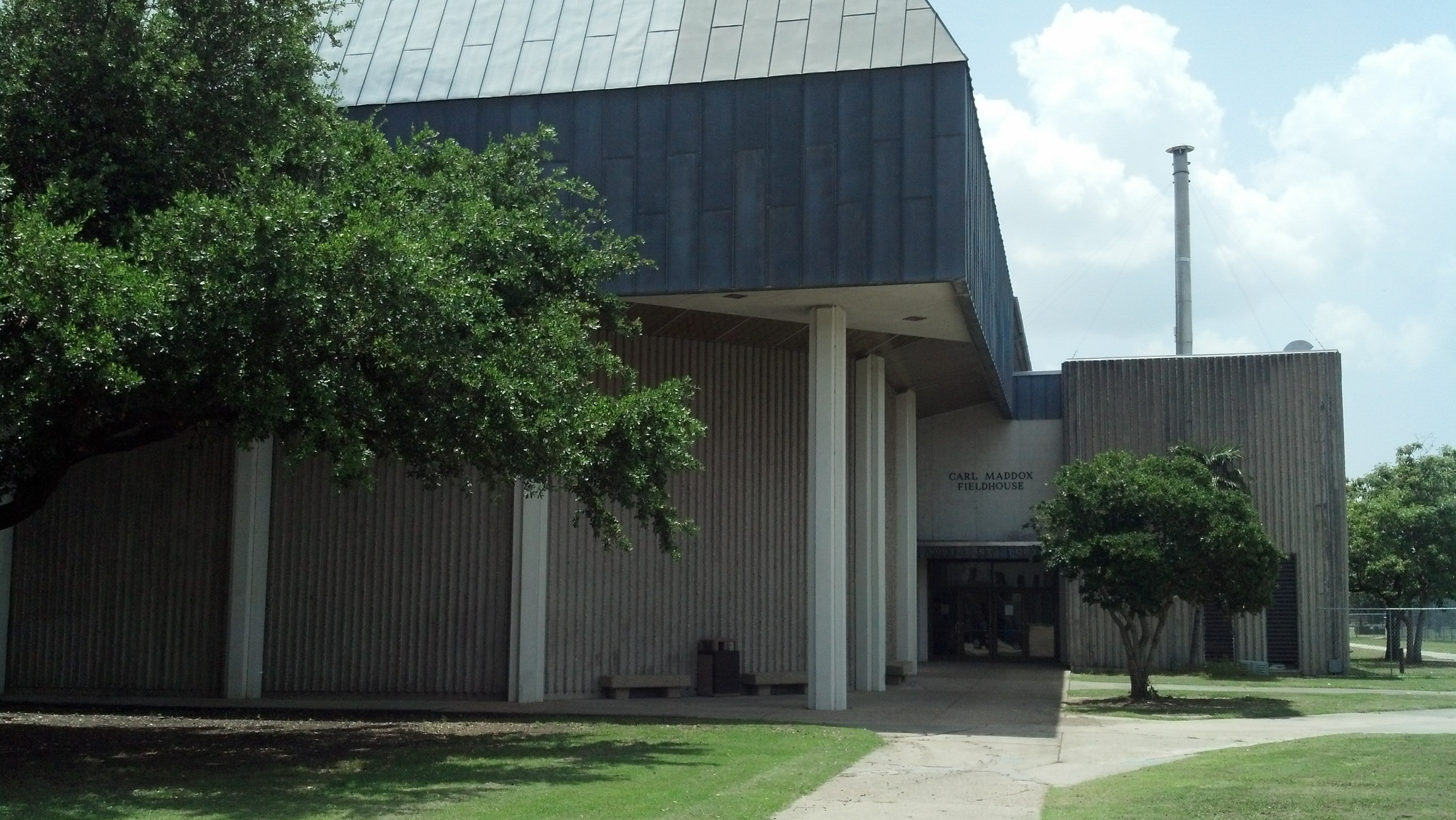
Carl Maddox Field House

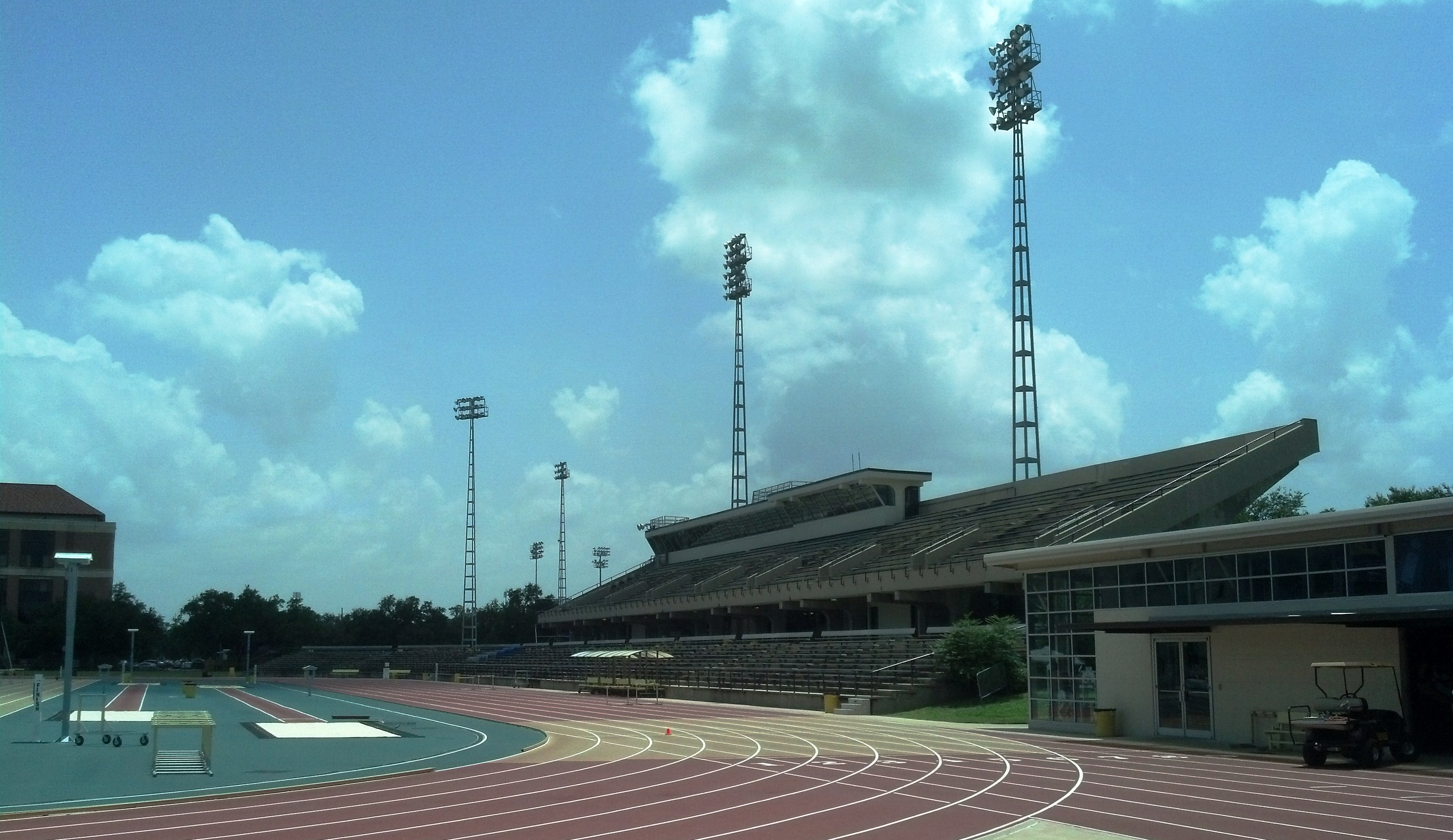
Bernie Moore Track Stadium

=== Carl Maddox Field House ===
Carl Maddox Field House built in 1975 is the indoor track and field home arena for the LSU Lady Tigers and LSU Tigers track and field teams. The arena has a seating capacity of 3,000. The field house features a 200-meter unbanked track, elevated jump runways, a variety of throwing areas and multiple high jump and vaulting areas. In 1998, the arena was renamed in honor of former LSU Athletic Director Carl Maddox.

=== Bernie Moore Track Stadium ===
Bernie Moore Track Stadium built in 1969 is the outdoor track and field home stadium for the LSU Lady Tigers and LSU Tigers track and field teams. The stadium has a seating capacity of 5,680. In 1971, the stadium was renamed after former LSU football and track & field coach, Bernie Moore. Moore coached the LSU Track and Field teams for 18 years (1930–47) and led the Tigers to their first NCAA National Championship in 1933 as well as 12 SEC crowns.

== Training facilities ==
=== Bernie Moore Track Stadium weight room ===
Opened in January 2003, the weight room is for the LSU Tigers track and field and LSU Lady Tigers track and field team's. The LSU track and field weight room is a 2,000 square foot facility designed for an Olympic style lifting program. Located adjacent to the track, the weight room features 10 multi-purpose power stations, 5 dumbbell stations, 4 power racks, 5 sets of competition plates, 10 competition Olympic bars, 2 multi-purpose racks, an assortment of selectorized machines and 2 televisions for multimedia presentations.

== Head coaches ==
Years	Coach
1978–1981	Bill McClure
1982	Murrell "Boots" Garland
1983–1986	Billy Maxwell
1987	Sam Seemes
1988–2004	Pat Henry
2004–present	Dennis Shaver
