= Louisiana State University Athletic Hall of Fame =

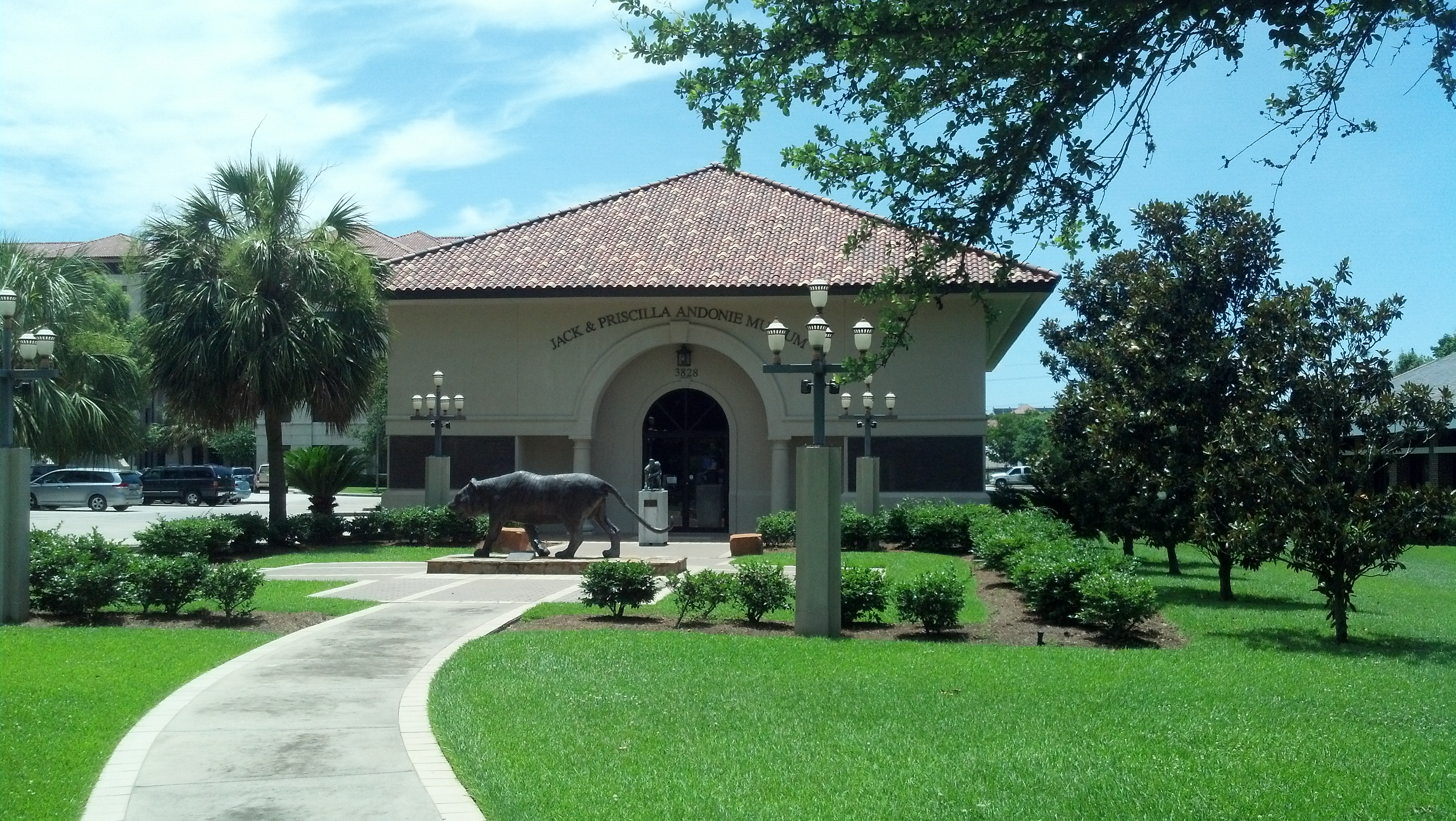
LSU Athletic Hall of Fame - Jack and Priscilla Andonie Museum

The Louisiana State University Athletic Hall of Fame recognizes members of the LSU Tigers and Lady Tigers athletics program that have made a lasting impact on Louisiana State University (LSU). To be eligible for the Hall of Fame in the Athlete category, an individual must have earned a college degree and gained national distinction through superlative performance. Hall of Fame candidates must also have established a personal reputation for character and citizenship. To be eligible in the Coach/Administrator category, the individual must have made significant contributions to LSU Athletics and gained national distinction through exceptional accomplishments in his or her field of expertise while establishing an image that reflects favorably upon the University.

The Jack and Priscilla Andonie Museum located on the campus of LSU in Baton Rouge, Louisiana is the physical location of the Hall of Fame.

== Administrators ==
Inducted	Member
2009	Jeff Boss (Equipment manager)
2011	Carl Maddox (Athletics director)
2021	Dr. Bill Bankhead (Sports & Event Administrator)

== Athletic Council ==
Inducted	Member
1942	James F. Broussard

== Athletic training ==
Inducted	Member
2008	Dr. Martin J. Broussard
2015	Mike Chambers
2015	Herman Lang

== Baseball ==
=== Members ===
Inducted	Member
1978	Joe Bill Adcock
1981	Alvin Dark
2006	Todd Walker
2007	Eddy Furniss
2008	Harry Rabenhorst (Head coach)
2011	Skip Bertman (Head coach; athletic director 2001-08)
2011	Lloyd Peever
2013	Kurt Ainsworth
2019	Jason Williams

=== Retired numbers ===
Number	Year	Member
15	2010	Skip Bertman
19	2010	Ben McDonald
36	2016	Eddy Furniss
12	2017	Todd Walker

== Men's basketball ==
=== Members ===
Inducted	Member
1937	Malcolm "Sparky" Wade
1952	Joe Dean (inducted as a player; athletic director 1987-2000)
1954	Bob Pettit
1990	Durand "Rudy" Macklin
2000	Shaquille O'Neal
2008	Harry Rabenhorst (Head coach)
2013	Dale Brown (Head coach)
2013	Frank Brian
2017	Collis Temple, Jr.
2025	John Brady (Head coach)
2025	Ronald Dupree

=== Retired numbers ===
Number	Year	Member
50	1954	Bob Pettit
23	1970	Pete Maravich
33	2000	Shaquille O'Neal
40	2010	Rudy Macklin
35	2020	Mahmoud Abdul-Rauf

== Women's basketball ==
=== Members ===
Inducted	Member
1998	Pokey Chatman (inducted as a player, later head coach)
2007	Marie Ferdinand
2009	Sue Gunter (head coach)
2011	Seimone Augustus
2015	Sylvia Fowles
2017	Joyce Walker
2023	Nyla Shepherd Moore
2025	Cornelia Gayden
2025	Temeka Johnson

=== Retired numbers ===
Number	Year	Member
33	2010	Seimone Augustus
34	2017	Sylvia Fowles

== Boxing ==
Inducted	Member
1939	J. L. Golsan
1940	Heston Daniel
1948	Henry Glaze
1950	Edsel "Tad" Thrash
1954	Calvin Clary
1958	Wilbert Moss
1977	Robert L. "Bobby" Freeman
1983	Al Michael
1995	William Snyder Parham

== Football ==
=== Members ===
Inducted	Member
1937	Ruffin G. Pleasant
1937	G. E. "Doc" Fenton
1937	J. J. Seip
1937	R. B. Howell
1937	Lawrence Dupont
1937	Tom Dutton
1937	Clarence Ives
1937	Newton C. Helm
1937	C. C. "Charlie" Mason
1937	Guy Nesom
1937	Abe Mickal
1937	Jesse Fatheree
1937	Marvin Stewart
1937	Gaynell Tinsley
1938	Edward Robertson
1938	Charles Rohm
1940	Ken Kavanaugh
1944	Steve Van Buren
1947	Clyde Lindsey
1948	Y. A. Tittle
1949	Abner Wimberly
1951	Kenny Konz
1954	Jerry Marchand
1956	Sid Fournet
1956	Joe Tuminello
1957	Jim Taylor
1961	W. E. "Bill" Pitcher
1964	Fred Miller
1964	Norman Stevens
1975	Percy Brown
1975	Billy Cannon
1976	Osborne "Butch" Helveston
1976	Doug Moreau
1976	Roy "Moonie" Winston
1977	Jerry Stovall
1978	Charles Strange
1978	Johnny Robinson
1980	Tommy Casanova
1982	George Bevan
1983	Tyler Lafauci
1988	Ron Estay
1988	Brad Davis
1988	Warren Capone
1989	Charles Alexander
1989	William B. Baggett, Sr.
1990	Robert W. Dugas
1991	Warren Rabb
1992	Bert Jones
2005	Tommy Hodson
2006	Kevin Faulk
2007	Nacho Albergamo
2007	Kevin Mawae
2007	Charles McClendon (Head coach)
2008	Anthony McFarland
2008	Bernie Moore (Head coach)
2009	James Britt
2009	Paul Dietzel (Head coach; later athletic director 1978-82)
2011	Wendell Davis
2015	Ebert Van Buren
2019	Bradie James
2021	Lora Hinton
2021	Billy Truax
2023	Al Coffee

=== Retired numbers ===
Number	Year	Member
20	1959	Billy Cannon
37	2009	Tommy Casanova
21	2018	Jerry Stovall
4	2025	Charles Alexander
7	2026	Bert Jones

== Men's golf ==
Inducted	Member
1938	Fred Haas, Jr.
1941	Henry Castillo
1970	B. R. Mac McLendon
1981	Gardner Dickinson, Jr.
1989	Paul Leslie
2005	Eddie Merrins
2025	J. Perry Cole (Head Coach)

== Women's golf ==
Inducted	Member
2009	Jenny Lidback
2019	Meredith Duncan
2025	Karen Bahnsen (Head Coach)

== Gymnastics ==
Inducted	Member
1996	Sandra Smith Whitmire
1999	Jeanie Beadle Staples
2006	Jennifer Wood
2013	Amy McClosky-McGinley
2015	April Burkholder
2021	Dr. Bill Bankhead (Coach)
2021	Ashleigh Clare-Kearney Thigpen
2021	Armando Vega (Coach)
2025	Rheagan Courville

== Softball ==
Inducted	Member
2009	Britni Sneed
2017	Kristin Schmidt
2019	Ashlee Ducote
2021	Yvette Girouard (Coach)

== Men's swimming & diving ==
Inducted	Member
1943	Robert Percy
1987	Richard "Rick" Meador (inducted as an athlete; later head coach)
2015	Todd Torres

== Women's swimming & diving ==
Inducted	Member
2013	Ashley Culpepper-Gluck
2017	Alison Maisch

== Men's tennis ==
Inducted	Member
1975	Steve Faulk
1998	Donni Leaycraft

== Women's tennis ==
Inducted	Member
2023	Megan Falcon

== Men's track & field ==
Inducted	Member
1937	Sidney Bowman
1937	Nathan Blair
1937	Glenn Hardin
1937	Jack Torrance
1937	Al Moreau
1937	Matthew Gordy
1941	Billy Brown
1947	Oris Erwin
1970	William Hardin
1978	Robert Lowther
1978	R. Delmon McNabb
1982	Joseph T. Butler, Sr.
1986	Harry Carpenter
2005	Eric Reid
2005	Bob Smith
2008	Bernie Moore (Head coach)
2017	Russ Buller
2019	Walter Davis
2021	Bruce Reid
2021	Lloyd Wills

== Women's track & field ==
Inducted	Member
1991	Lurline Struppeck
1998	Schowonda Williams
2006	D'Andre Hill
2006	Cheryl Taplin
2009	Esther Jones
2011	Suzette Lee
2015	Kim Carson
2015	Laverne Eve
2017	Debbie-Ann Parris-Thymes
2021	Peta-Gaye Dowdie
2023	Danyel Mitchell

== Volleyball ==
Inducted	Member
2013	Daniela Reis
2023	Nyla Shepherd Moore

== Wrestling ==
Inducted	Member
2019	Kevin Jackson

== See also ==
- LSU Tigers and Lady Tigers
