= D'Andre Hill =

American sprinter (born 1973)

Medal record

Women's athletics

Representing the United States

World Championships
Gold medal – first place	1995 Gothenburg	4 × 100 m relay

D'Andre "DeeDee" Hill (born April 19, 1973) is an American track and field coach and former athlete. She competed in sprint events, mainly in 100-meter dash. Her personal record in the event was 10.92 seconds. She represented her country over 100 m at the 1996 Atlanta Olympics and shared in a gold medal in the 4 × 100-meter relay at the 1995 World Championships in Athletics, having run in the heats only.

Hill was a three-time individual American collegiate champion at Louisiana State University: twice in the 100 m and once in the indoor 60-meter dash. She also won three NCAA relay titles. She has since gone on to be a women's college track coach and head coach at Vanderbilt University (the first African-American head coach in the school's history).

== Career ==
=== Sprinting ===
Hill was born in Cincinnati and attended Mount Healthy High School while living there. She took up track and field and quickly established herself as a sprinter. She won three high school state titles and was the 100 m and 200-meter dash runner-up at the 1989 USATF Junior Olympics. She returned to that event the following year and was again runner-up in the 100 m.

She gained an athletic scholarship to study kinesiology at Louisiana State University and, after skipping her first year of eligibility in 1993, she began to run for the LSU Lady Tigers track and field from 1994 onwards. At the 1994 NCAA Women's Indoor Track and Field Championships—her first major meet—she was a finalist in both the 55-meter dash and 200 m, earning All-America honors in both. She began her outdoor season with runner-up finishes in the 100 m at the Penn Relays and the Southeastern Conference Championships. At the NCAA Women's Outdoor Track and Field Championships she shared in the NCAA title in the 4 × 100 m relay and placed third over both 100 m and 200 m. Her senior national debut followed at the USA Outdoor Track and Field Championships and she reached the 100 m final, coming seventh overall.

In Hill's second year of collegiate competition, she was again finalist in both short sprints at the NCAA Indoor Championships. She won both the individual and relay events at the Southeastern Conference Outdoor Championships. Two further golds followed at the NCAA Outdoor Championships, as she helped the Lady Tigers defend their relay title and claimed her first individual collegiate title in the 100 m with a run of 11.11 seconds. She also managed sixth in the 200 m. She continued to rise in the national rankings with a fourth-place finish at the 1995 USA Outdoor Championships. This earned her a place on the United States relay team for the 1995 World Championships in Athletics. She was selected to run the heats only (being replaced by Gwen Torrence in the final) and anchored a team of Celena Mondie-Milner, Carlette Guidry-White, and Chryste Gaines to first in the qualifying heats. In the final the American women won the gold medal – an honor that Hill shared in as the competing alternate.

In her third and final year with the LSU Lady Tigers, she again took NCAA All American honours in the short sprints available that year. She won the indoor 55 m title, and defended her outdoor 100 m individual and relay titles. Over 200 m, she also had her best finishes, coming second both indoors and out. She took a clean sweep of short sprint titles at Southeastern Conference level, winning the indoor 60-meter dash and 200 m races, as well as the 100 m dash and relay titles outdoors. Her final collegiate season raised her total NCAA titles to six – the second most in the LSU program's history after Dawn Sowell.

Hill ran the best times of her career in 1996. These included times of 6.69 seconds for the 55 m, 7.21 seconds for the 60 m indoors, and 22.49 seconds for the 200 m outdoors. The 1996 United States Olympic Trials saw her improve her 100 m best four times consecutively, recording 11.00 seconds in the first round, 10.99 seconds in the next round, 10.97 seconds in the semi-final, before crossing the line in 10.92 seconds to place third in the final. Working with LSU coach Dennis Shaver, she placed her improvements down to her being in a competitive training group, which included hurdler Kim Carson, and sprinters Sheila Echols and Zundra Feagin. Her place at the trials earned her selection for the United States at the 1996 Summer Olympics. Despite her being one of the three individual 100 m runners (alongside Gail Devers and Gwen Torrence), she was not picked for the relay team on the basis of her being a straight-away specialist (positions occupied by the more favoured Devers and Torrence). At the 1996 Atlanta Games she reached the semi-finals of the 100 m, but failed to improve in that round and was eliminated in sixth position.

In 1996, she won the Honda Sports Award as the nation's best female collegiate track and field athlete.

After she graduated from college, her professional track sprinting career never progressed and she ranked outside the nations top ten sprinters from the period between 1997 and 2001.

=== Coaching ===
Hill soon entered coaching after retirement from sprinting. She was the women's head track and field coach at the University of Dayton from 2001 to 2004. She moved to Texas Christian University in December 2004, serving as assistant coach and leading the team's sprint and relay sections. Under her guidance, the TCU Horned Frogs women's 4 × 400 m relay team reached the NCAA Outdoor Championships for the first time in 2005. The team returned the following year and after breaking the school record they were finalists, placing seventh. Among others, she coached NCAA 200 m finalist Virgil Hodge. Over the course of her tenure the TCU Horned Frogs women's team moved up from 70th in the NCAA rankings to 27th.

In 2007 Hill was appointed track and field head coach at Vanderbilt University. This made her the institution's first ever African-American to reach a head coach position for the Vanderbilt Commodores athletic team. She set about re-focusing the team to sprint events.

== Personal records ==
- 100-meter dash – 10.92 seconds (1996)
- 200-meter dash – 22.49 seconds (1996)
- 55-meter dash indoor – 6.69 seconds (1996)
- 60-meter dash indoor – 7.21 seconds (1996)
- 200-meter dash indoor – 23.24 seconds (1996)

== International competitions ==
Year	Competition	Venue	Position	Event	Notes
1995	World Championships	Gothenburg, Sweden	1st	4 × 100 m relay	42.44 (heats)
1996	Olympic Games	Atlanta, United States	6th (semis)	100 m	11.20

== National titles ==
- NCAA Women's Outdoor Track and Field Championships
  - 100-meter dash: 1995, 1996
- NCAA Women's Indoor Track and Field Championships
  - 55-meter dash: 1996
