= Aleia Hobbs =

American sprinter (born 1996)

Aleia Hobbs OLY
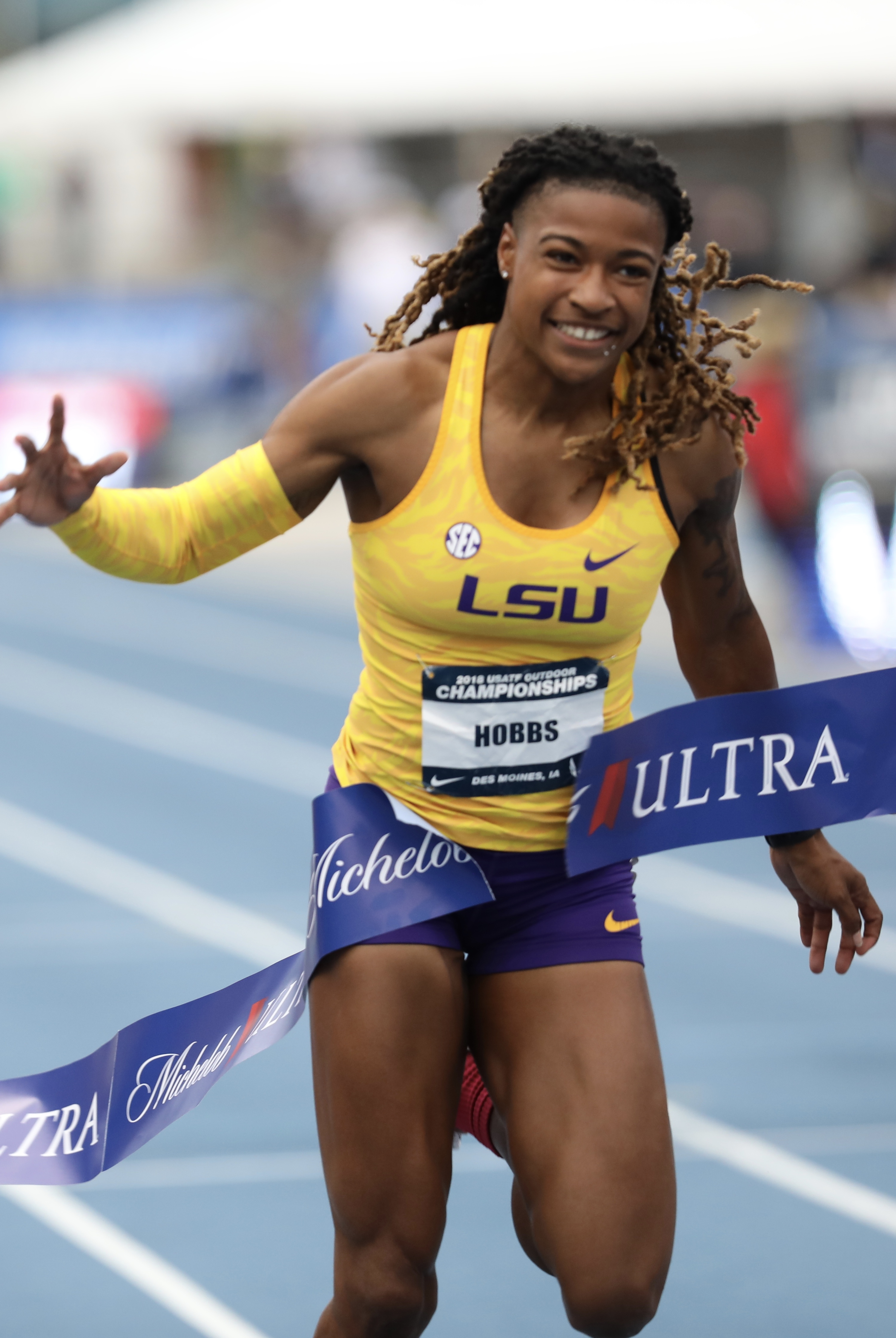
- Hobbs at the 2018 U.S. Championships

Personal information
- Born: February 24, 1996 (age 30) New Orleans, Louisiana, U.S.
- Height: 5 ft 8 in (173 cm)

Sport
- Country: United States
- Sport: Track and field
- Event: Sprints
- College team: LSU Lady Tigers (2015–2018)
- Turned pro: 2018
- Coached by: Dennis Shaver (2014–)

Achievements and titles
- Personal bests: 100 m: 10.81 (2022); Indoors; 60 m: 6.94 AR (2023)
Medal record
Women's athletics
Representing the United States
Olympic Games
Silver medal – second place	2020 Tokyo	4 × 100 m relay
World Championships
Gold medal – first place	2022 Eugene	4 × 100 m relay
World Relays
Gold medal – first place	2019 Yokohama	4 × 100 m relay
Pan American Junior Championships
Gold medal – first place	2015 Edmonton	4 × 100 m relay
Silver medal – second place	2015 Edmonton	100 m

Aleia Hobbs OLY (born February 24, 1996) is an American track and field sprinter competing in the 60 meters and 100 meters. Hobbs is the North American record holder for the indoor 60 m with a time of 6.94 seconds, set in February 2023, becoming the second-fastest woman of all time at the event.

Hobbs won three global medals as part of national women's 4 × 100 meters relays. She has also won two U.S. national titles and is also a two-time individual NCAA Division I champion.

== Biography ==
Aleia Hobbs committed to the LSU Lady Tigers in 2014 and ran for them until mid 2018, when she turned pro and signed a sponsorship deal with Adidas. During her time at LSU, she also represented the United States at the 2015 Pan American Junior Championships, where she earned a silver medal in the 100 m and a gold medal in the 4 × 100 m relay.

Hobbs represented the United States at the 2019 World Relays, anchoring the United States to gold.

On April 3, 2021, she opened her outdoor season at the Battle on the Bayou in New Orleans, Louisiana with a world-leading time of 10.99 s in the 100 m.

On February 18, 2023, the 26-year-old stormed to second on the world 60 m all-time list with a time of 6.94 seconds, just 0.02 s shy of 30-year-old Irina Privalova's world record, at the U.S. Indoor Championships in Albuquerque, New Mexico. She took 0.01 s off the North American indoor record set by Gail Devers also in 1993.

On August 2026, she received a 6-month doping ban after using an in-home saline infusion to self-treat flue-like symptoms, as she did not qualify for a TUE.

== Statistics ==
Information from World Athletics profile unless otherwise noted.

=== Personal bests ===
Event	Time (s)	Wind (m/s)	Venue	Date	Notes
60 meters indoor	6.94	—N/a	Albuquerque, NM, United States	February 18, 2023	North American record, 2nd all time
100 meters	10.81	+0.5	Eugene, OR, United States	June 24, 2022	
100 meters	10.72 w	+2.9	Eugene, OR, United States	June 24, 2022	(wind-assisted)
4 × 100 m relay	42.05	—N/a	Knoxville, TN, United States	May 13, 2018	CR (Note: Shared with Mikiah Brisco, Kortnei Johnson, and Rachel Misher for the LSU Lady Tigers)

=== International championship results ===
Representing the United States
Year	Competition	Venue	Position	Event	Time	Wind (m/s)	Notes
2015	Pan American Junior Championships	Edmonton, AB, Canada	2nd	100 m	11.50	−0.6	
2015	Pan American Junior Championships	Edmonton, AB, Canada	1st	4 × 100 m relay	43.79	—N/a	
2019	World Relays	Yokohama, Japan	1st	4 × 100 m relay	43.27	—N/a	
2021	Olympics Games	Tokyo, Japan	2nd	4 × 100 m relay	41.90	—N/a	(Note: Time from the heats; Hobbs was replaced in the final.)
2022	World Championships	Eugene, OR, United States	6th	100 m	10.92	+0.8	
2022	World Championships	Eugene, OR, United States	1st	4 × 100 m relay	41.56	—N/a	

=== 100 m circuit wins ===
- Diamond League
  - 2019: Shanghai Diamond League
  - 2022: Lausanne Athletissima

=== 100 m seasonal bests ===
Year	Time	Wind (m/s)	Venue	Notes
2010	11.95	+1.3	Norfolk, VA, U.S.	
2011	11.75	+1.5	New Orleans, LA, U.S.	
2012	11.77	+1.5	Arlington, TX, U.S.	
2013	11.68	+1.8	Baton Rouge, LA, U.S.	
2013	11.68	−0.3	Greensboro, NC, U.S.	
2014	11.49	+1.2	Baton Rouge, LA, U.S.	
2015	11.13	+2.0	Eugene, OR, U.S.	
2016	11.34	+0.7	Jacksonville, FL, U.S.	
2017	10.85	+2.0	Baton Rouge, LA, U.S.	
2018	10.90	+1.9	Tampa, FL, U.S.	
2018	10.86 w	+3.7	Austin, TX, U.S.	Wind-assisted
2019	11.03	+0.2	Shanghai, China	
2019	10.83 w	+2.8	Baton Rouge, LA, U.S.	Wind-assisted
2020	11.12	+0.2	Rome, Italy	
2021	10.88 w	+2.4	Baton Rouge, LA, U.S.	Wind-assisted
2021	10.91	+0.7	Baton Rouge, LA, U.S.	
2022	10.72 w	+2.9	Eugene, OR, U.S.	Wind-assisted
2022	10.81	+0.5	Eugene, OR, U.S.	

=== National championship results ===
Representing the New Era Track Club (2012–2013), the LSU Lady Tigers (2015–2018), and adidas (2019)
Year	Competition	Venue	Position	Event	Time	Wind (m/s)	Notes
2012	U.S. Youth Championships (born 1996–1997)	Arlington, Texas	1st	200 m	24.19	+1.0	PB
2012	U.S. Youth Championships (born 1996–1997)	Arlington, Texas	1st	100 m	11.77	+1.5	SB
2013	U.S. World Youth Trials	Edwardsville, Illinois	5th	100 m	12.09	−2.1	
2015	NCAA Division I Indoor Championships	Fayetteville, Arkansas	15th	60 m	7.68	—N/a	
2015	NCAA Division I Outdoor Championships	Eugene, Oregon	6th	100 m	11.16 w	+3.1	Wind-assisted
2015	NCAA Division I Outdoor Championships	Eugene, Oregon	5th	4 × 100 m relay	43.69	—N/a	
2015	U.S. Junior Championships	Eugene, Oregon	2nd	100 m	11.38	+0.6	
2017	NCAA Division I Indoor Championships	College Station, Texas	9th	60 m	7.26	—N/a	
2017	NCAA Division I Championships	Eugene, Oregon	DQ (semi 1)	4 × 100 m relay	—	—N/a	Out of zone pass
2017	NCAA Division I Championships	Eugene, Oregon	5th	100 m	11.12	+0.3	
2017	U.S. Championships	Sacramento, California	7th	100 m	11.23	+0.3	
2018	NCAA Division I Indoor Championships	College Station, Texas	1st	60 m	7.07	—N/a	Collegiate record, PB
2018	NCAA Division I Championships	Eugene, Oregon	1st	100 m	11.01	−0.7	
2018	NCAA Division I Championships	Eugene, Oregon	1st	4 × 100 m relay	42.25	—N/a	
2018	U.S. Championships	Des Moines, Iowa	1st	100 m	10.91	+0.6	
2019	U.S. Championships	Des Moines, Iowa	6th	100 m	11.33	−1.7	
2021	U.S. Olympic Trials	Eugene, Oregon	7th	100 m	11.20	−1.0	
2022	U.S. Championships	Eugene, Oregon	2nd	100 m	10.72	+2.9	Wind-assisted
2023	U.S. Indoor Championships	Albuquerque, New Mexico	1st	60 m	6.94	—N/a	AR #2nd all time

- NCAA results from Track & Field Results Reporting System.
