= Bob Causey =

US international rugby union player

- Full name: Robert Causey
- Born: May 21, 1953 (age 73) Louisiana, United States
- Height: 6 ft 5 in (196 cm)
- Weight: 240 lb (110 kg)
- School: Istrouma High School
- University: Louisiana State University

Rugby union career
- Position: Lock
International career
| Years | Team | Apps | (Points) |
| 1977–87 | United States | 8 | (0) |

Robert Causey (born May 4, 1953) is an American former international rugby union player.

== Biography ==
Causey, a Louisiana native, was educated at Istrouma High School in Baton Rouge.

A 6 ft 5 in lock, Causey was known in rugby circles as "Big Red" on account of his size and hair color. He took up rugby union while at Louisiana State University (LSU) and was top scorer in the team which won the 1976 national championship. In 1977, Causey gained his first cap for the United States, against Canada in Burnaby Lake. His international career included match against the Springboks in 1981 and an appearance against England at the 1987 Rugby World Cup, which was the last of his eight Test caps. He was one of the founding members of the Baton Rouge RFC.

From 2012 to 2021, Causey served as senior coach of LSU, leading them to three SCRC West Division championships.

Causey is a member of the US Rugby Hall of Fame.

== See also ==
- List of United States national rugby union players
