= Carl Maddox Field House =

Track and field facility at Louisiana State University

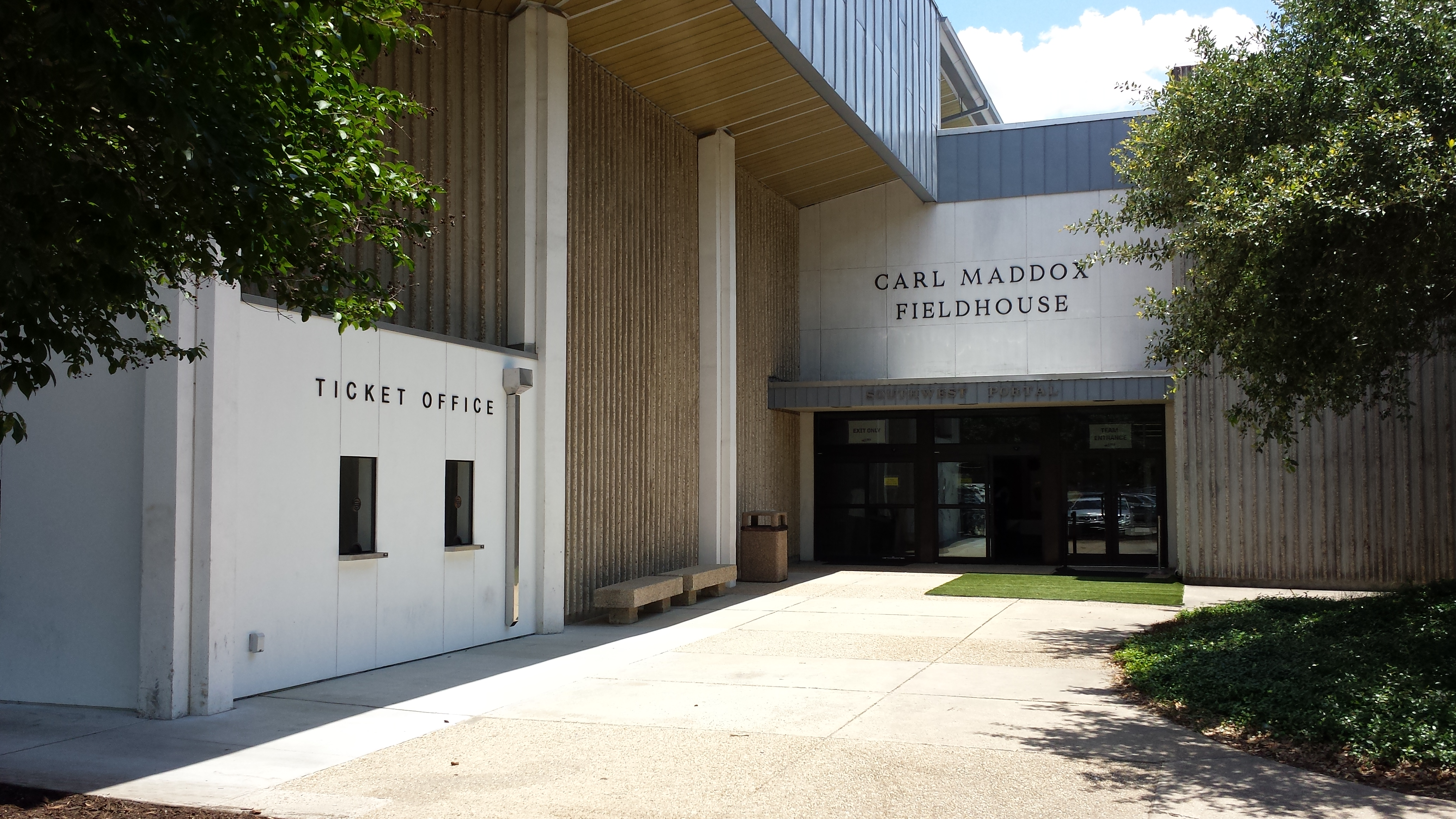
- Interactive map of Carl Maddox Field House
- Location: Nicholson Drive; Baton Rouge, Louisiana 70803; USA
- Coordinates: 30.415972°N 91.185705°W
- Owner: Louisiana State University
- Operator: LSU Athletics Department
- Capacity: 3,000

Construction
- Opened: 1975

Tenants
- LSU Tigers track and field (NCAA); LSU Lady Tigers track and field (NCAA)

Website
- Carl Maddox Field House website

The Carl Maddox Field House is an indoor track and field facility located on the campus of Louisiana State University in Baton Rouge, Louisiana. The facility, built in 1975, serves as the indoor home of the LSU Tigers track and field team and the LSU Lady Tigers track and field team. The stadium has a seating capacity of 3,000. In 1998, the facility was renamed in honor of former LSU Athletic Director Carl Maddox during the SEC Indoor Championships. Maddox was a fan of track and field and a major force in building the field house.

The field house features a 200-meter unbanked track, elevated jump runways, a variety of throwing areas and multiple high jump and vaulting areas.

Carl Maddox Field House also hosts the LHSAA Indoor Track & Field State Championships. and youth indoor track meets.

== See also ==
- Bernie Moore Track Stadium
- LSU Tigers track and field
- LSU Lady Tigers track and field
