= Tom Dutton (American football) =

American football player (1893–1969)

Profile
- Position: Guard/Tackle

Personal information
- Born: March 22, 1893; Arcadia, Louisiana
- Died: December 1, 1969 (aged 76); New Orleans, Louisiana
- Listed height: 6 ft 3 in (1.91 m)
- Listed weight: 225 lb (102 kg)

Career information
- High school: Minden
- College: LSU (1912–1913; 1919)

Awards and highlights
- All-Southern (1912, 1913, 1919); Louisiana Sports Hall of Fame; LSU Athletic Hall of Fame

Tom Whited Dutton (March 22, 1893 – December 1, 1969) was an American college football player.

== Early life ==
He attended Minden High School but did not play on the school's football team.

== LSU ==
Dutton was a prominent guard for the LSU Tigers of Louisiana State University. He was thrice selected All-Southern. James Dwyer showed him the sport, and even used Dutton for a "kangaroo play" in which back Lawrence Dupont would crawl between Dutton's legs; supposedly very effective in short yardage situations.

Dutton was later a key member of the university's Board of Supervisors, which hired and fired football coaches, and president of LSU Alumni. He is a member of both the Louisiana Sports Hall of Fame and Louisiana State University Athletic Hall of Fame. He was nominated, though not selected, for an Associated Press All-Time Southeast 1869–1919 era team.

=== 1913 ===
Dutton was captain in 1913.

=== 1919 ===
Although he graduated in 1914, rules in effect at the time allowed Dutton one more year of eligibility and he returned in 1919 for post-graduate work and a final football season. He was again captain of the team; coached by Irving Pray.

== Personal life ==
He married Thelma Opdenweyer at Prairieville, Louisiana on May 8, 1917.
