= Highland Road Community Park =

Public park in Baton Rouge, Louisiana

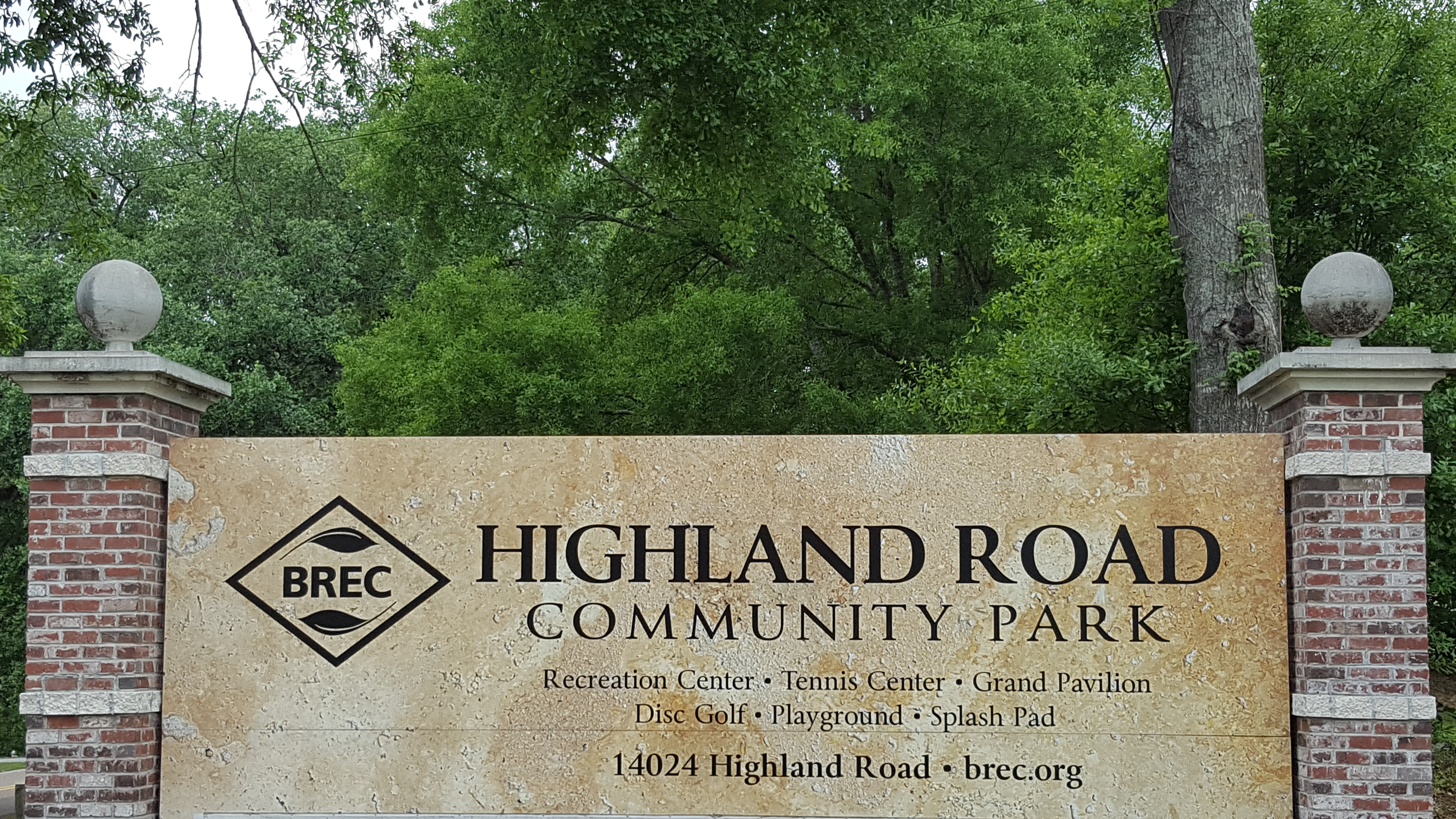
- Interactive map of Highland Road Community Park
- Type: Urban park
- Location: Baton Rouge, Louisiana
- Coordinates: 30.349865°N 91.072963°W
- Area: 144.04 acres (0.5829 km^{2})
- Owner: BREC
- Operator: BREC
- Status: Open all year

Highland Road Community Park or Highland Road Park is a 144.4-acre (0.584 km^{2}) public park in Baton Rouge, Louisiana. The Recreation and Park Commission for the Parish of East Baton Rouge (BREC) owns and operates the park.

The park is the home course for the LSU Tigers cross country and LSU Lady Tigers cross country teams.

== Park amenities ==
=== Baseball fields ===
Youth baseball and tee ball fields are located in the park.

=== Boat launch ===
The boat launch at the park provides paddling access to Bayou Fountain and Bayou Manchac.

=== Cross country ===
Highland Road Park is the home course for the LSU Tigers cross country and LSU Lady Tigers cross country teams. LHSAA cross country races are also held in the park.

=== Disc golf ===
The disc golf course is located on the rolling hills section of the park.

=== Highland Road Park Observatory ===
The Highland Road Park Observatory, sponsored by BREC, the LSU Department of Physics and Astronomy and the Baton Rouge Astronomical Society, is located on the south side of the Park.

=== Recreation center and playground area ===
This area offers an indoor gymnasium and rooms that can be used for events. A splash pad and pavilion are located in this area of the park.

=== Rugby and soccer ===
The Baton Rouge Rugby Football Club field and soccer field is located in the northern field of the park next to the recreation center.

=== Tennis center ===
Tennis courts and a tennis academy are located in the park. The Highland Park Tennis Association, developed in 1976, hosts round robin events every Saturday morning at Highland Road Community Park. The Round Robin brings together on average 75 players of all levels in competitive doubles tennis.

=== Walking Path ===
A walking path is located in the park.

== Gallery ==
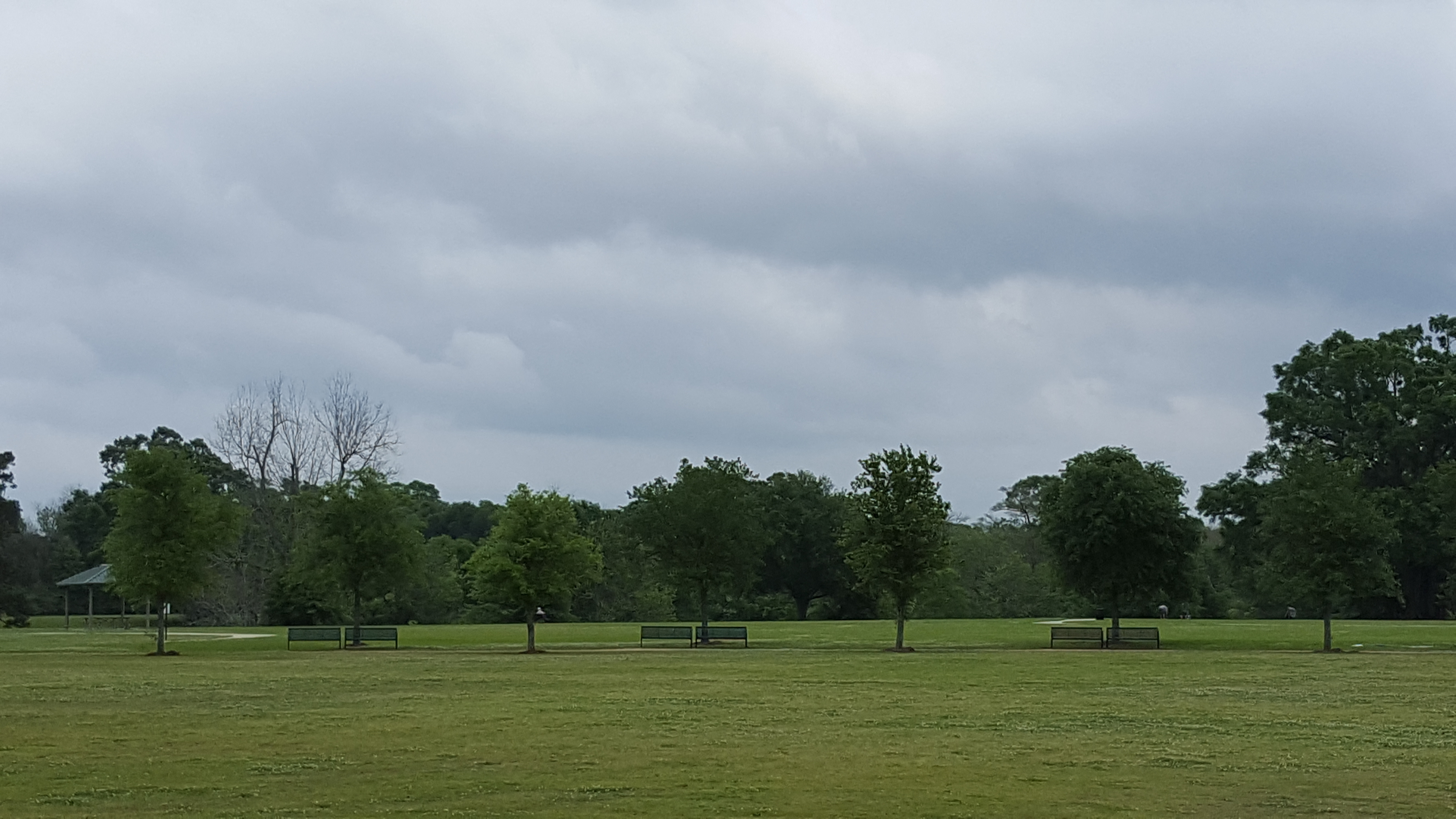
Highland Road Community Park walking path

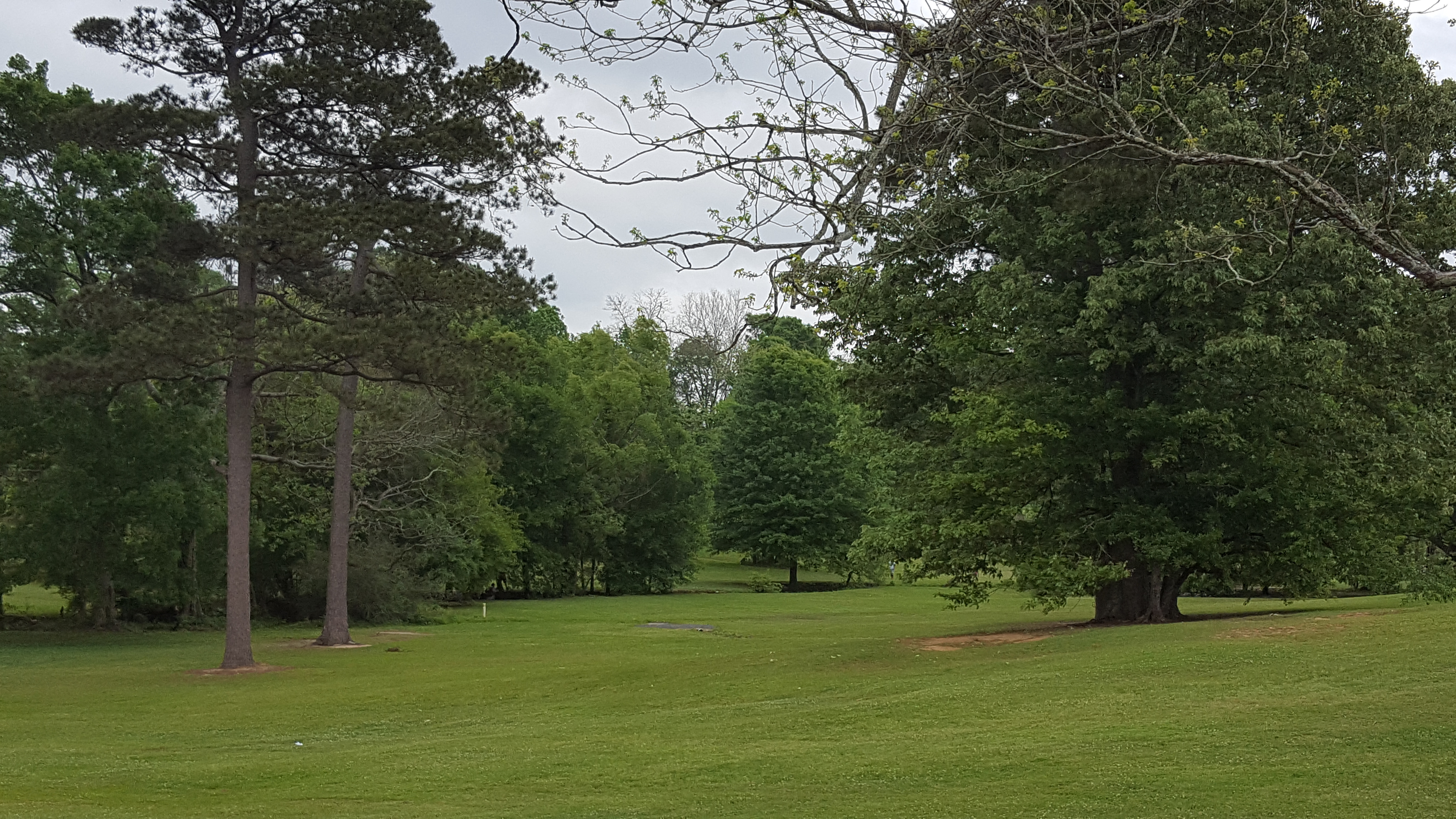
Highland Road Community Park green space

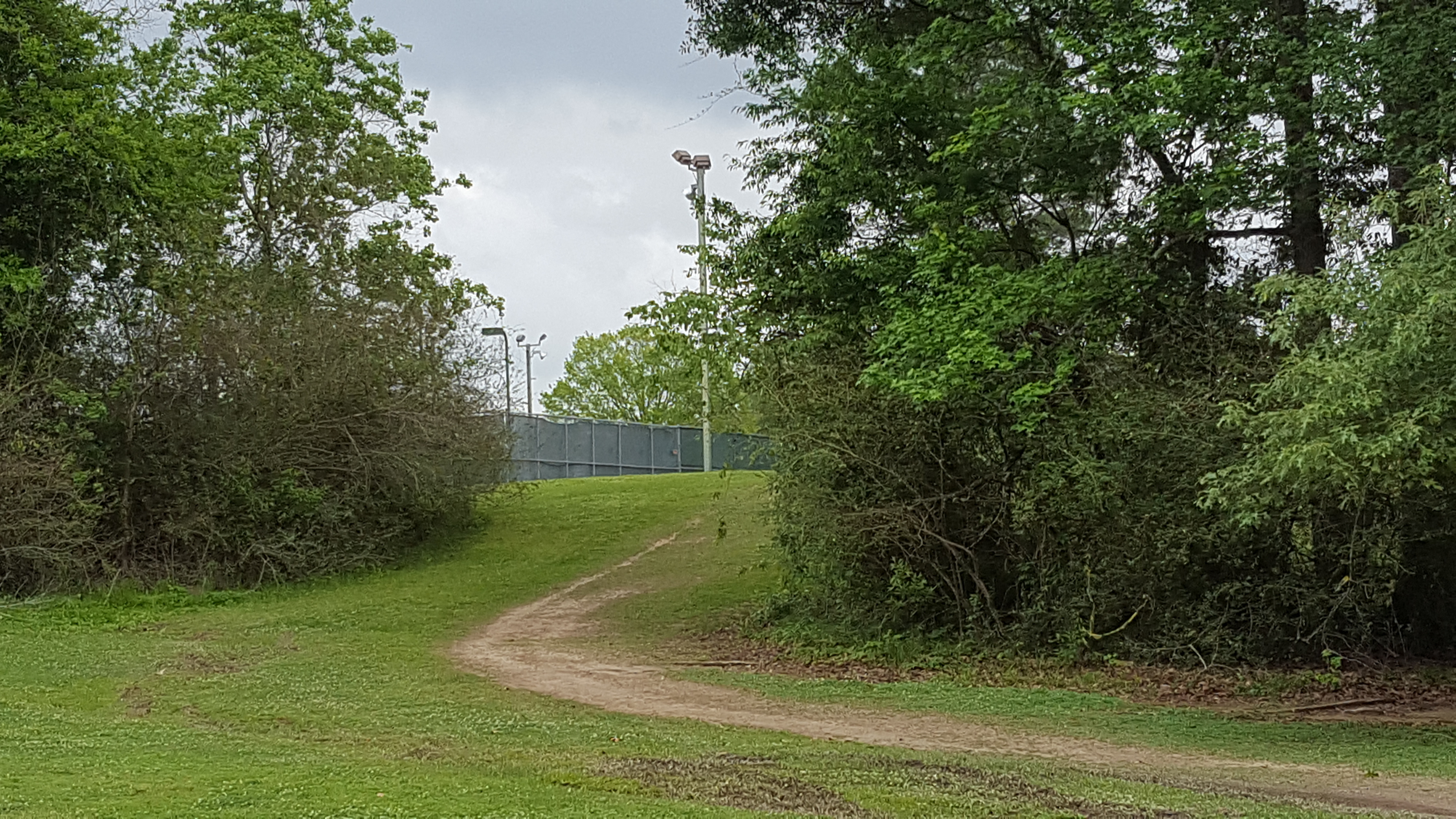
Highland Road Community Park trail

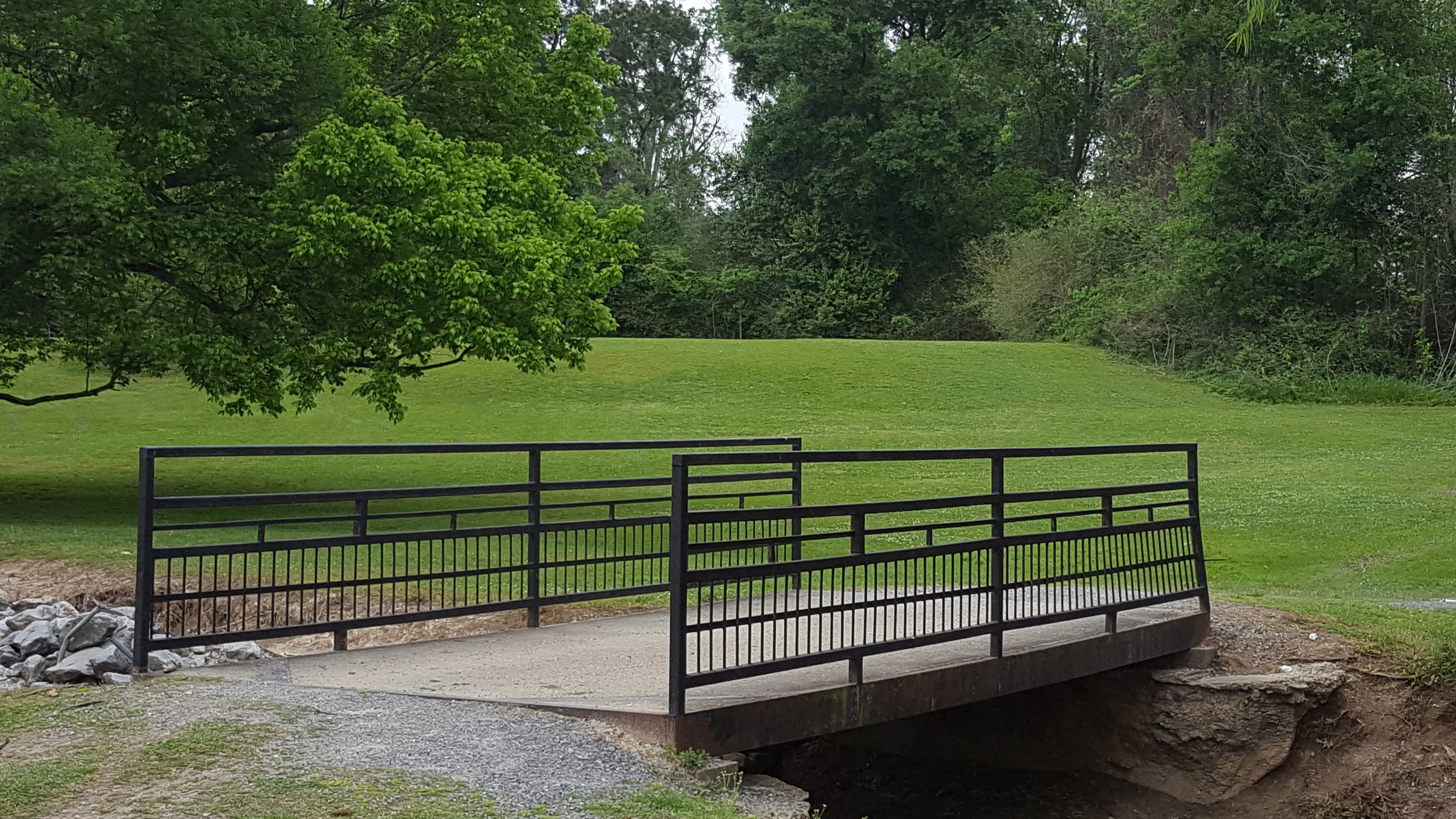
Highland Road Community Park bridge

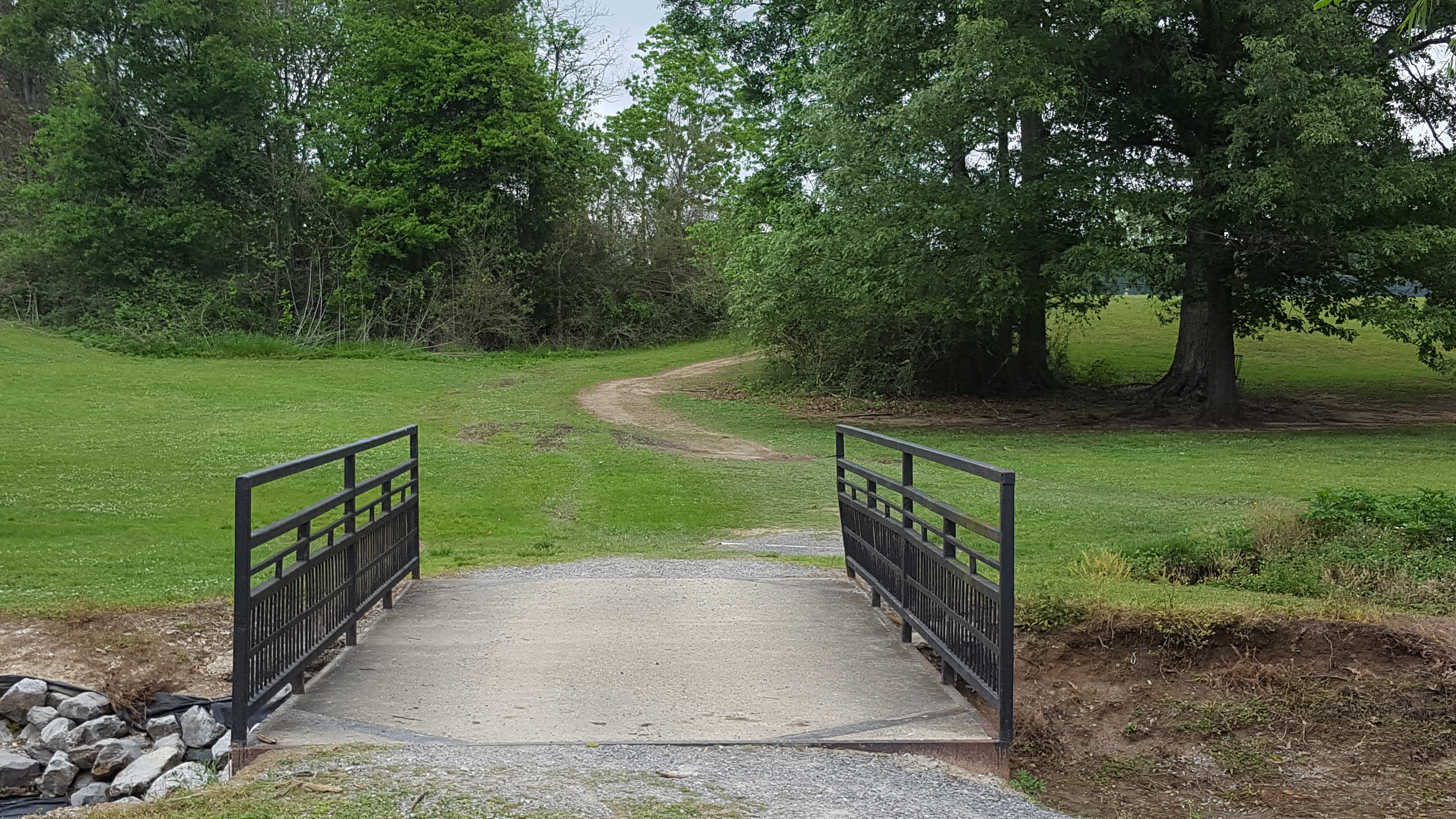
Highland Road Community Park bridge and trail

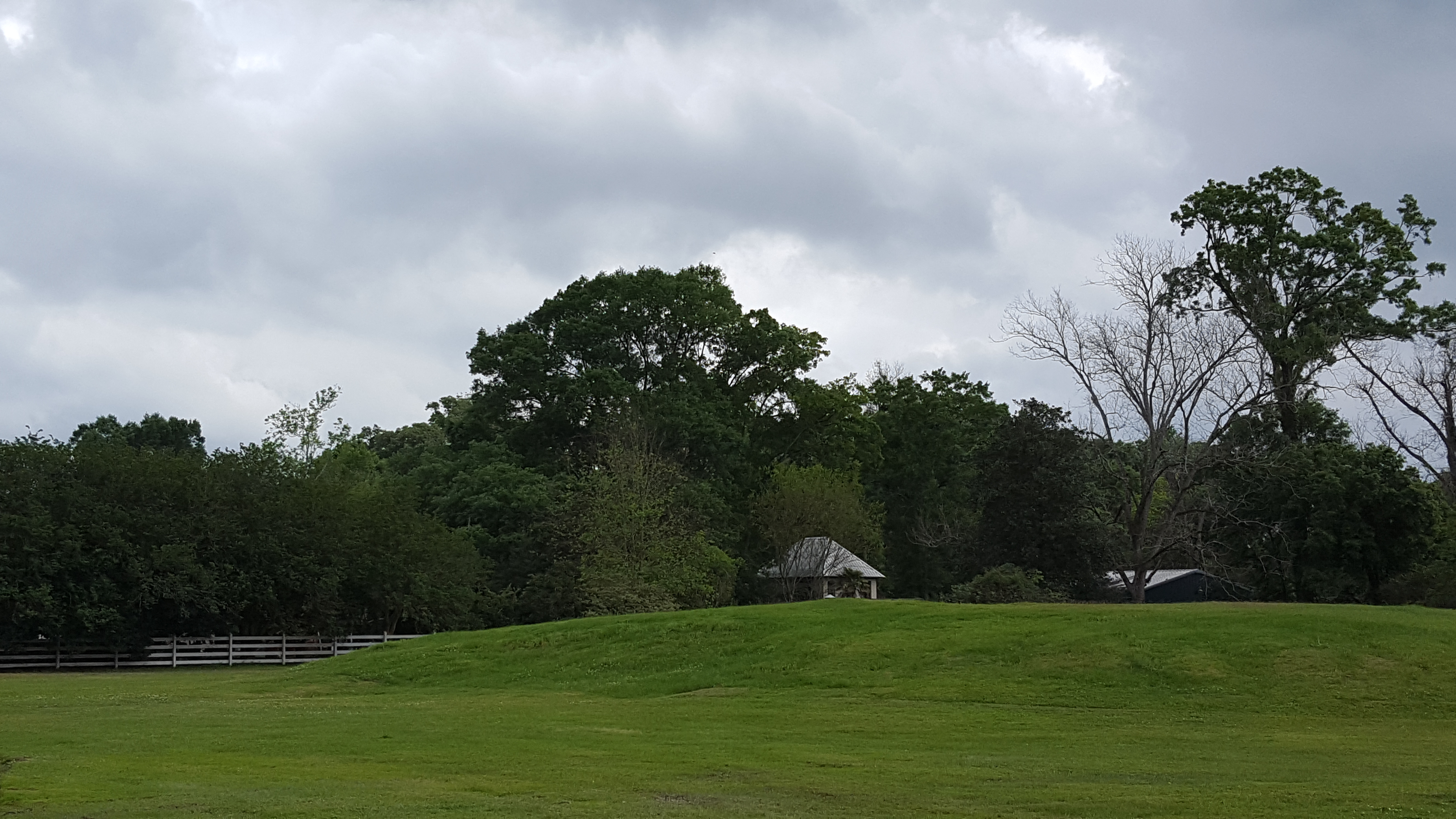
Highland Road Community Park structures

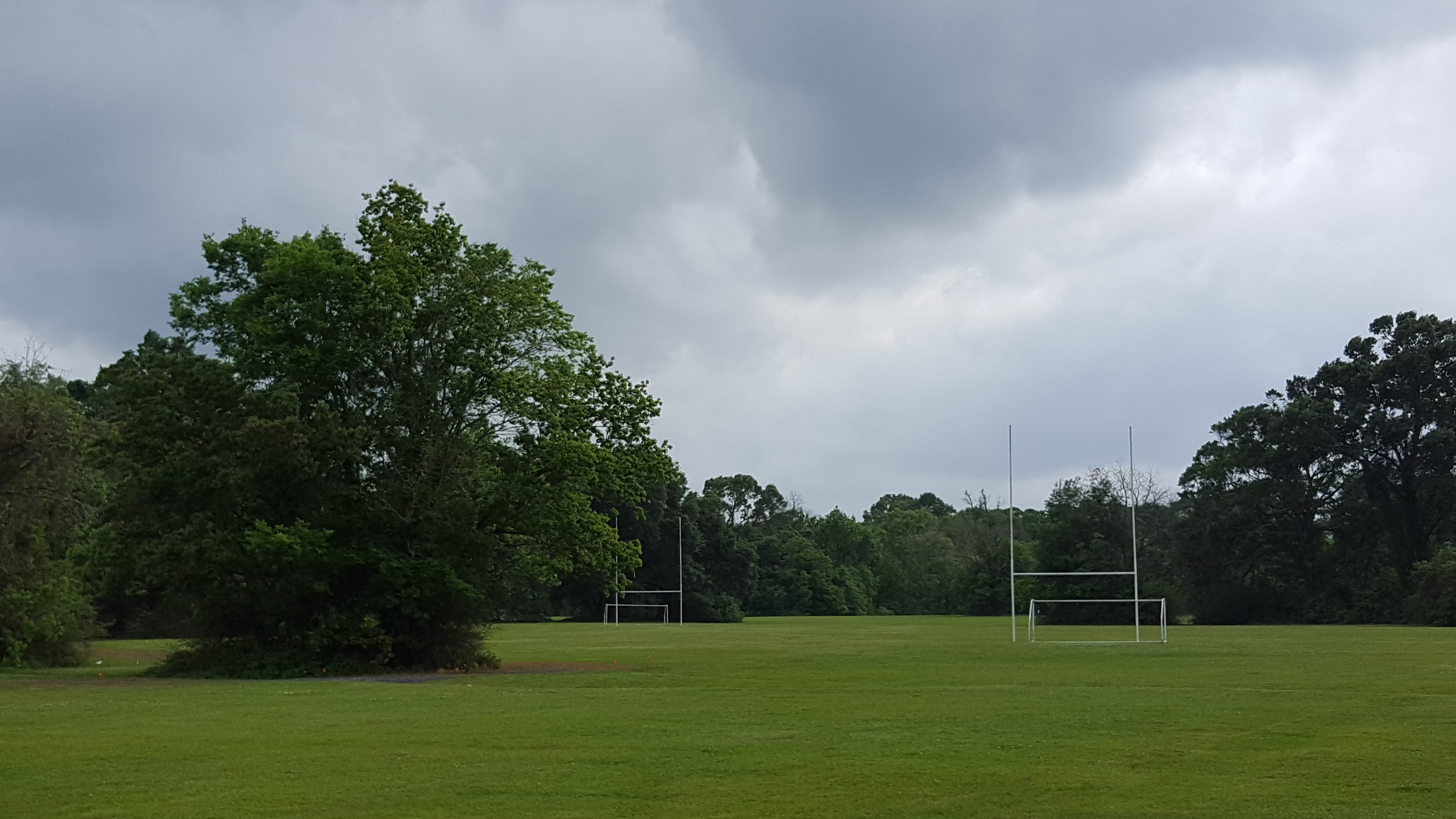
Highland Road Community Park rugby and soccer field

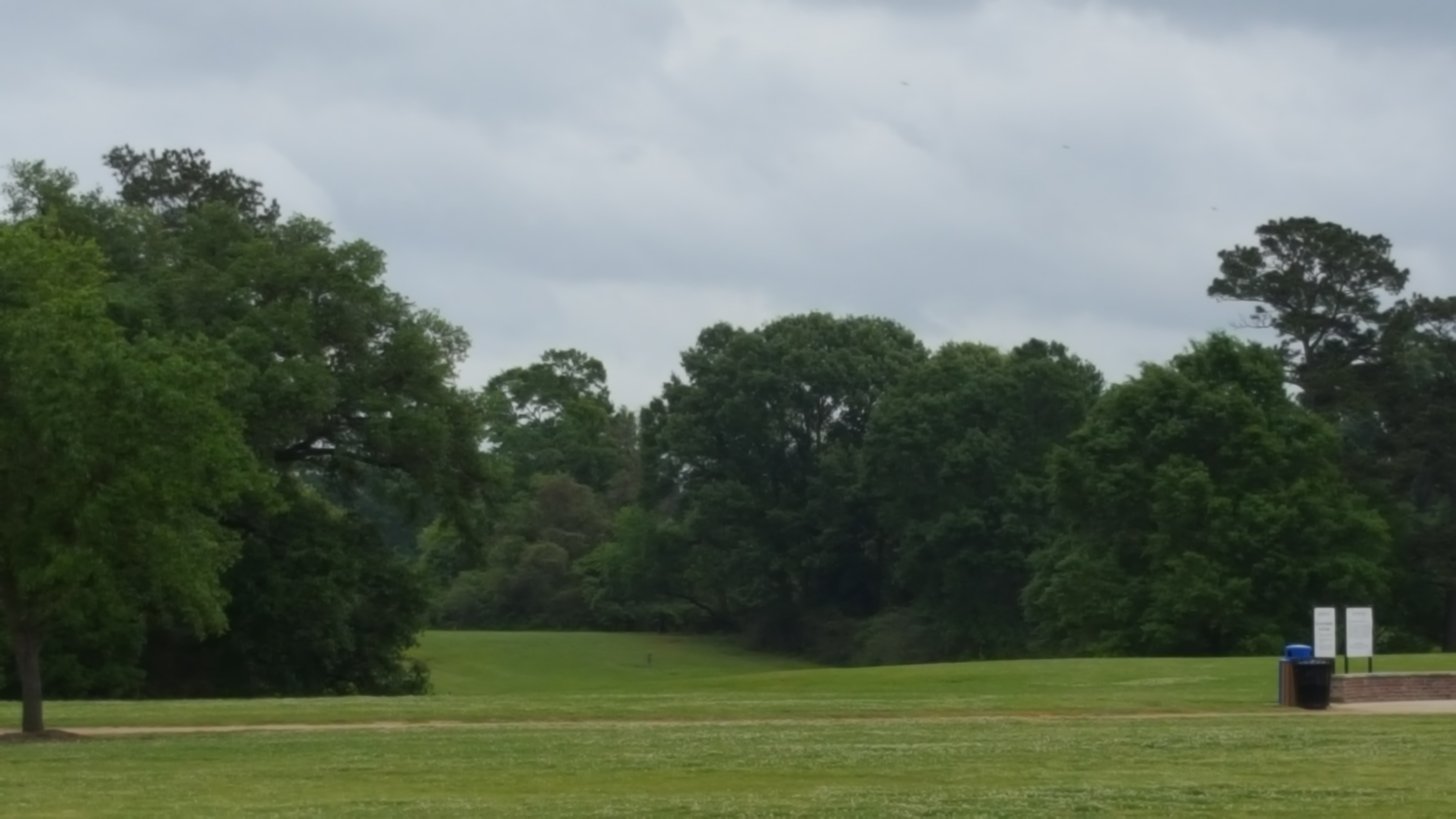
Highland Road Community Park rolling hills
