= Carl Maddox =

American college coach and administrator (1912–1996)

Biographical details
- Born: December 10, 1912; Magnolia, Arkansas, U.S.
- Died: February 16, 1996 (aged 83); Baton Rouge, Louisiana, U.S.

Coaching career (HC unless noted)
- 1932–1933: Franklin HS (LA)
- 1934–1942: Gulf Coast Military Academy
- 1948–1950: Greenwood HS (MS)
- 1951–1953: Greenville HS (MS)
- 1954–1959: LSU (off. backfield)

Administrative career (AD unless noted)
- 1968–1978: LSU
- 1979–1984: Mississippi State

Accomplishments and honors

Championships
- 1 College football national championship (1958)

Carl Maddox (December 10, 1912 – February 16, 1996) was an American coach and administrator who was the athletics director of Louisiana State University (1968–1978) and Mississippi State University (1979–1983).

== Early life ==
Maddox was born on December 10, 1912, in Magnolia, Arkansas, where his father, Augustus Carlyle Maddox, was working as a professor at the Third District Agricultural School. The family lived in Oklahoma while the elder Maddox was teaching at the Southeastern State Normal School and Oklahoma A&M before settling in Natchitoches, Louisiana after he became the head of the mathematics department at the Louisiana State Normal School. Maddox graduated from Louisiana Normal in 1932.

== Coaching ==
Maddox began his coaching career at Franklin High School in Franklin, Louisiana. He then coached at the Gulf Coast Military Academy. His 1942 team won an unofficial state championship by defeating the Shorty McWilliams-led Meridian High School 20-6 on Thanksgiving Day. He joined the United States Navy later that year and served on motor torpedo boat during World War II. He resumed his coaching career at Greenwood High School in Greenwood, Mississippi. He then coached at Greenville High School in Greenville, Mississippi. His Greenville team won the Mississippi state championship in 1953.

In 1954, Maddox joined the LSU Tigers football team as the offensive backfield coach. Head coach Gaynell Tinsley was fired at the end of the season, but Maddox was retained by his successor, Paul Dietzel. He helped coach the 1958 LSU Tigers football team to a national championship. The following season, one of Maddox's players, Billy Cannon, won the Heisman Trophy.

== Administration ==
=== LSU ===
In December 1959, Maddox was named director of the LSU Student Union. With the Board of Supervisors, he worked on the planning and construction of the university's first student union building, which opened on January 6, 1964.

On January 13, 1968, Maddox was named LSU's athletic director. He succeeded the retiring Harry Rabenhorst, who took the job on an interim basis following the death of Jim Corbett. Under Maddox, LSU added five new women's teams (volleyball, basketball, gymnastics, tennis and swimming) and four new men's sports (cross country, gymnastics, wrestling and swimming). He was responsible for hiring women's gymnastics coach D-D Breaux and men's basketball coach Dale Brown. He oversaw construction of the LSU Field House, LSU Assembly Center, Bernie Moore Track Stadium, and LSU Tennis Stadium, as well as the installation of lights at Alex Box Stadium. He was forced to step down in 1978 after he reached the mandatory retirement age of 65.

=== Mississippi State ===
On January 26, 1979, Maddox was named athletic director at Mississippi State University. He inherited an athletic department that was on NCAA probation and was forced to forfeit nineteen football victories for illegal recruiting practices. He convinced Emory Bellard to come out of retirement to take over the football program. Bellard led the Bulldogs to bowl game appearances in 1980 and 1981. Maddox was able to get the athletic department out of debt, added two new women's sports, and oversaw the construction of a new track and football practice fields. He reached the mandatory retirement age of 70 in 1982, but was granted a special one-year extension. He was succeeded by Dr. Charley Scott in January 1984.

== Honors and awards ==
Maddox was awarded the Corbett Award in 1986. The Corbett Award is presented annually "to the collegiate administrator who through the years has most typified Corbett's devotion to intercollegiate athletics and worked unceasingly for its betterment."

The Carl Maddox Field House at LSU is named after him along with the Carl Maddox Track and Field Complex at Mississippi State. The United States Sports Academy's Carl Maddox Sport Management Award is also named in his honor.

Maddox was inducted into the Mississippi Sports Hall of Fame in 1989 and the Louisiana State University Athletic Hall of Fame in 2011.

== Death ==
Maddox died on February 16, 1996 in Baton Rouge, Louisiana from complications from a triple bypass surgery. His death occurred five days after another former LSU athletic director – Bob Brodhead.
