= Baton Rouge Rugby Football Club =

US rugby union club, based in Baton Rouge, LA

BRRFC
- Full name: Baton Rouge Rugby Football Club
- Union: USA Rugby
- Founded: 1977; 49 years ago
- Location: Baton Rouge, Louisiana
- Ground: Highland Road Park
- League: True South

Official website
- www.batonrougerugby.net

The Baton Rouge Rugby Football Club (also known as BRRFC), founded in 1977, is a men's rugby union team based in Baton Rouge, Louisiana, United States. The club competes in and is governed by the True South and USA Rugby.

== History ==
Founded in 1977, the club is a rugby union team based in Baton Rouge.

Many players are from the surrounding areas: Lafayette, Mandeville, Hammond and New Orleans but also international invites have had players from Britain, Australia, New Zealand and Fiji.

Up until 1991, Baton Rouge played as a Division I Rugby Team, where they secured many national invites, namely the 1985 National Championship game vs Philadelphia Whitemarsh. The club has had success throughout the years even after transitioning to Division II rugby in 1992. The Club participates in many local Baton Rouge Charities; most notably Toys for Tots, the BR Women's Shelter, Youth Rugby and the Red Cross.

== Accomplishments ==
- 1979: ERU National Championship Game
- 1980, 1982, 1984: Regional Finals Qualifier
- 1985: ERU National Championship Game
- 1993: ERU National Championship Runner-up
- 1994: ERU National Championship Runner-up
- 2013: True South Rugby - West Champions
- 2014: True South Rugby - West Champions

== Founding Members ==
Founding members include: Hookers, Phil Siccone and Tyrone Yokum; props, Jim Brugh, Reggie Davis, Steve Hazel, and Bob ‘Santa’ Lundsford; locks, Bob Causey and Tom Gagneaux; loose forwards, Barry Haney, Rob Wright, Gary Meyers, and Wayne Fontanelle; No. 8, Mark Lawson and Rick Odom; back, Frank Perkins, Johnny Mclean, Clay Mahaffey, Paul Lachin, Phil Lachin, Bob Dow, Les Bratton, Bill Bratton, Donnie Bratton, and the Hammond connection; Bob Tuminello, Gene Hampton, Bobby Guidera, and Jim Morris.

== Tournaments ==
Baton Rouge Rugby puts on two tournaments every year - The Redfish Sevens Tournament and the Ho-Ho-Ho Tournament for Charity.

=== Redfish Sevens ===
The Redfish Tournament is a Rugby Sevens round-robin game. All clubs of any age group, male and female may participate. The tournament usually boasts 25-40 teams every year for the sevens non-qualifier sometime between June and July.

=== Ho-Ho-Ho Tournament ===
The Ho-Ho-Ho Tournament is a co-ed scrimmage that occurs every year in December to raise money for Toy-for-Tots, the BR RFC's target charity work every year. In 2016, the club donated 200+ Toys and $400 to the local area Toys for Tots at Happy's Bar. The Scrimmage is unique as players dress up in santa themed outfits and play a toned-down game of rugby so injuries can be avoided. Players come from around the state of Louisiana to participate as ages 17+ are welcome.

== Rugby Union Memberships ==
The Baton Rouge Rugby Football Club was originally a member of Deep South Rugby Football Union.

In the late 1990s, the club moved to the Texas Geographical Union where they competed against other TGU Division 1/2 teams such as: Dallas, Austin, Houston, San Antonio and Shreveport. Baton Rouge later returned to the Deep South Rugby Union in 2009, converting back to a Division 2 squad.

In 2013, the Deep South Rugby Union became a subdivision of the True South Geographical Union, later becoming True South Rugby where Baton Rouge currently competes against its main rivals:

- Birmingham RFC
- Jackson RFC
- Memphis RFC

== Practice/Field Location ==
Currently, BR RFC practices and plays at Highland Road Park in Baton Rouge.
