= LSU Lady Tigers cross country =

- University: Louisiana State University
- Head coach: Dennis Shaver
- Conference: SEC
- Location: Baton Rouge, LA
- Course: Highland Road Park
- Nickname: LSU Lady Tigers
- Colors: Purple and gold

Women's NCAA appearances
- 1999, 2000, 2003, 2004, 2005, 2006, 2007

The LSU Lady Tigers cross country program represents Louisiana State University in the sport of women's cross country running. The program competes in National Collegiate Athletic Association (NCAA) Division I and the Southeastern Conference (SEC).

== Coaching staff ==
Dennis Shaver is the head coach for the LSU Lady Tigers cross country and track and field program; Khadevis Robinson is the assistant coach who is responsible for the day-to-day oversight of the men's and women's cross country teams.

== Facilities ==
=== Highland Road Park ===
Highland Road Park is the site of home cross country meets for the LSU Lady Tigers cross country team. The course is located in the 144.04-acre park.

=== Bernie Moore Track Stadium weight room ===
Opened in January 2003, the weight room is for the LSU Lady Tigers cross country and LSU Tigers cross country team's. The LSU track and field weight room is a 2,000 square foot facility designed for an Olympic style lifting program. Located adjacent to the track, the weight room features 10 multi-purpose power stations, 5 dumbbell stations, 4 power racks, 5 sets of competition plates, 10 competition Olympic bars, 2 multi-purpose racks, an assortment of selectorized machines and 2 televisions for multimedia presentations.

== See also ==
- LSU Tigers track and field
- LSU Tigers and Lady Tigers
