= Dawn Sowell =

American former sprinter (born 1966)

Dawn Sowell (born 27 March 1966) is an American former sprinter who ran the fastest times in the 100 meters and 200 meters in 1989, with 10.78 secs and 22.04 secs. The 10.78 clocking made her the third-fastest woman of all-time at that time, and still ranks her 19th on the world all-time list (as of 2024).

== Early life ==
Dawn was born in Philadelphia, one of seven children, the daughter of an electrician. Her mother worked three jobs simultaneously, until moving to a career in real estate. Sowell attended Chester High School in Chester, Pennsylvania. She had no interest in sport until she realized that she was faster than the boys in her gym class. Her family moved to Richmond, Virginia, where she graduated from Jefferson-Huguenot-Wythe High School in 1984. She matriculated to junior college and moved to Texas.

== Career ==
She moved on to Louisiana State University, competing for their LSU Lady Tigers track and field team. She was the holder of the American collegiate record in the 100 m with her best time of 10.78 seconds, set in the qualifying heats at the 1989 NCAA Women's Division I Outdoor Track and Field Championships, where she won in 10.91 after a slow start. In 2019 Sha'Carri Richardson, also from LSU Lady Tigers track and field broke the record with a time of 10.75. Sowell also won the 200m in 22.04 secs, to become the fastest woman in the world over both sprints in 1989. Although she did not apply herself to either studies or training, she quickly excelled on the track. At the end of 1989, her bests ranked her third on the US and world all-time 100m list (behind Florence Griffith-Joyner and Evelyn Ashford), sixth on the US all-time 200m list (behind Florence Griffith-Joyner (FloJo), Valerie Brisco-Hooks, Ashford, Pam Marshall, Chandra Cheeseborough and Gwen Torrence) and 15th on the 200m world all-time list. As of 2021, she ranks 7th (100) and 19th (200) on the US all-time lists and 16th (100) and 43rd (200) on the world all-time lists.

Sowell won her first and only senior national title at the 1989 USA Outdoor Track and Field Championships, taking the 100 m crown in 11.12 seconds, ahead of Sheila Echols and Esther Jones. Her only international appearance for the United States followed at the 1989 IAAF World Cup, where she was a member of the bronze medal-winning 4 × 100-meter relay team alongside Echols, Jones and Wendy Vereen. She was tipped to be the next FloJo, but retired from track and field due to chronic injury problems. Sowell is now a public speaker, focusing on health and wellness.

== International competitions ==
Year	Competition	Venue	Position	Event	Notes
1989	World Cup	Barcelona, Spain	3rd	4 × 100 m relay	42.83

== National titles ==
- USA Outdoor Track and Field Championships
  - 100 m: 1989
- NCAA Women's Division I Outdoor Track and Field Championships
  - 100 m: 1989
  - 200 m: 1989

== See also ==
- List of 100 metres national champions (women)
