= Jeanie Beadle =

American gymnast (born 1958)

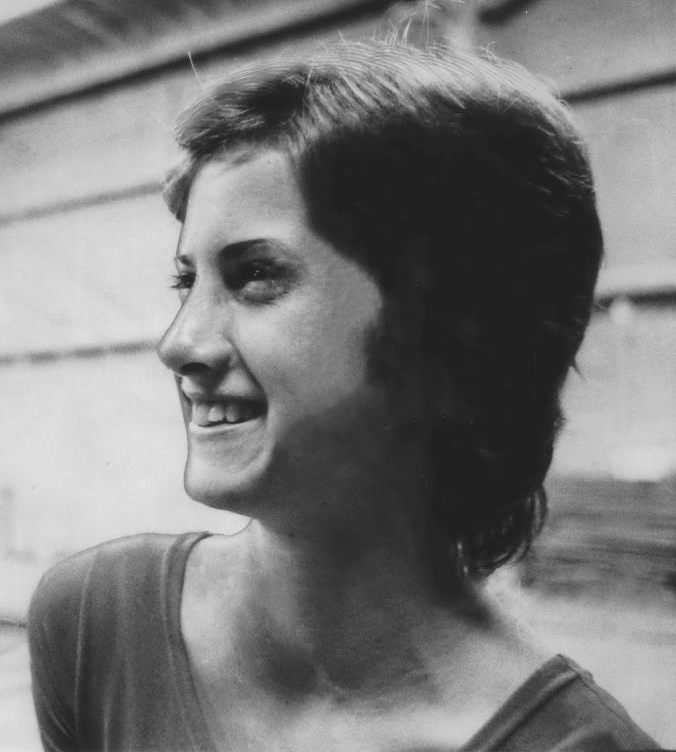
- Beadle in 1976

Personal information
- Full name: Jeanie Beadle Staples
- Born: April 21, 1958 (age 68) Baton Rouge, Louisiana, U.S.

Gymnastics career
- Discipline: Women's artistic gymnastics
- Country represented: United States
- College team: LSU Tigers

Jeanie Beadle Staples (born April 21, 1958) is an American gymnast. She was on multiple National teams and excelled in Collegiate gymnastics while at Louisiana State University (LSU) as both a National Champion and All-American.

== Personal life ==
Beadle was born in Baton Rouge, Louisiana, to Burt and Marion Beadle, an engineer. She now lives in Branson, Missouri where she teaches gymnastics. She is married to minister Joey Staples, with a daughter and son.

== Gymnastics career ==
Jeanie Beadle grew up in Baton Rouge, where she began gymnastics at the local YMCA. She won the YMCA Nationals in 1973 and in 1976 was named an alternate for the U.S. Olympic Team. She was also an alternate for the 1975 Pan American Games and the 1978 World University Games teams. She went to Louisiana State University, where she competed and was All American for three years. She was the first All-American women in LSU gymnastics history. She was the National Beam Champion in 1977 and became the first women LSU National Champion in any sport. She was inducted into the LSU Hall of Fame in 2001 and sits on the board.

== Post-Olympic career ==
With her sights set on the 1980 Olympic team, Beadle's career ended in her junior year in college when she severely injured her knee at a meet in Auburn, Alabama in 1979. She has since been teaching and coaching gymnastics for 25 years at different clubs and at different levels at her home in Branson Missouri. "I love kids and enjoy watching them get excited about learning new skills. I consider it a joy to share the gift that God has given me," Jeanie says.
