= Lawrence Dupont =

American football player (1891–1955)

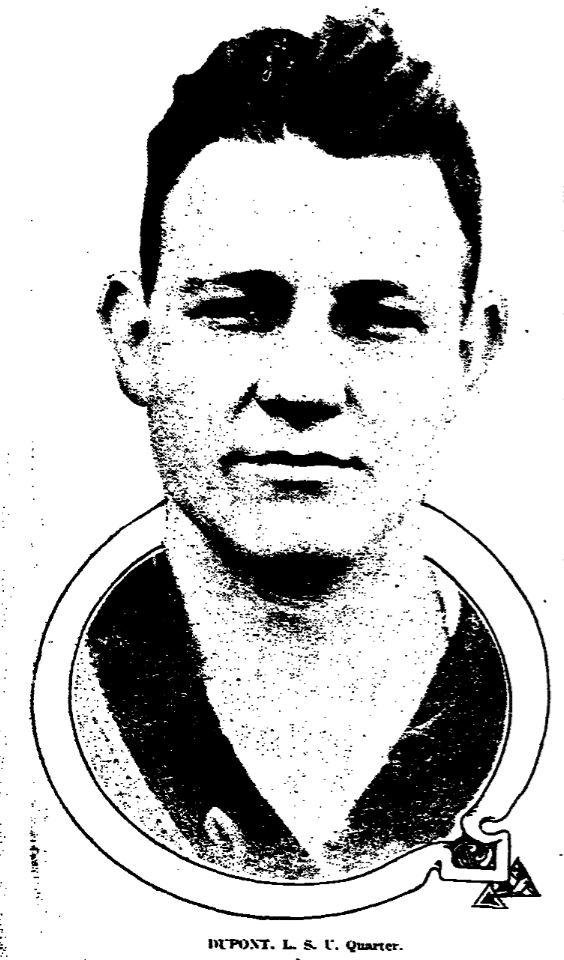

Profile
- Position: Quarterback

Personal information
- Born: December 22, 1891; Houma, Louisiana, U.S.
- Died: April 5, 1955 (aged 63)
- Listed height: 5 ft 7 in (1.70 m)
- Listed weight: 165 lb (75 kg)

Career information
- College: LSU (1910–1913)

Awards and highlights
- LSU Athletic Hall of Fame

Lawrence Herbert "Dutch" Dupont (December 22, 1891 – April 5, 1955) was a college football player. He was a prominent quarterback for the LSU Tigers of Louisiana State University from 1910 to 1913. He was elected to the LSU Hall of Fame in 1937. James Dwyer used Tom Dutton for a "kangaroo play" in which Dupont would crawl between Dutton's legs; supposedly very effective in short yardage situations. He graduated from Western Military Academy. Dupont never came off the field. He had 15 touchdowns in 1913, four of them coming on November 22 in a game against rival Tulane in a 40–0 victory.
