= Schowonda Williams =

American hurdler (born 1966)

Personal information
- Nationality: American
- Born: December 3, 1966 (age 59) Altamonte Springs, Florida, United States

Sport
- Sport: Track and field
- Event: 400 metres hurdles

Schowonda Williams (born December 3, 1966) is an American hurdler. She competed in the women's 400 metres hurdles at the 1988 Summer Olympics.

Competing for the LSU Lady Tigers track and field team, Williams won the 1988 NCAA Division I Outdoor Track and Field Championships in the 400 m hurdles.
