= Danyel Mitchell =

American athlete

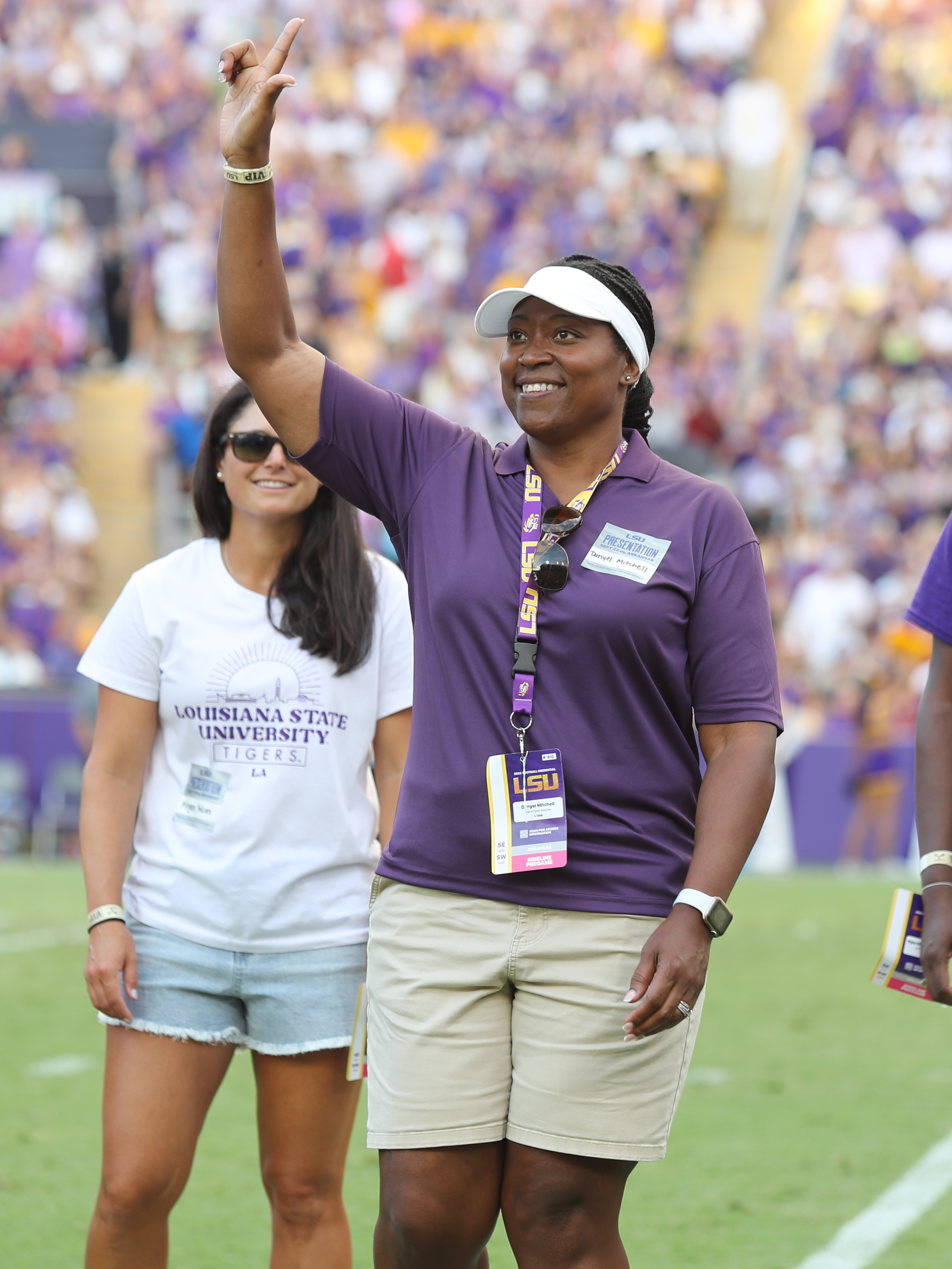
- Mitchell at Tiger Stadium in 2023

Personal information
- Born: September 16, 1972 (age 54) Vallejo, California, United States

Sport
- Sport: Track and field

Danyel Mitchell (born September 16, 1972) is a female former discus thrower and shot putter from the United States. She set her personal best (54.62 metres) in the women's discus throw event on August 10, 1995 at the World Championships in Gothenburg, Sweden.

Mitchell was a member of the Louisiana State University track and field team.
