= Dennis Shaver =

American track and field coach

Current position
- Title: Head coach
- Team: LSU

Biographical details
- Born: Salina, Kansas

Coaching career (HC unless noted)
- 1981–1982: Hutchinson CC (asst.)
- 1982–1985: Hutchinson CC
- 1985–1991: Barton CC
- 1992–1995: Auburn (asst.)
- 1995–2004: LSU (asst.)
- 2004–present: LSU (track and field)
- 2004–present: LSU (cross country)

Accomplishments and honors

Championships
- NCAA Women's Outdoor (2008, 2012-Vacated); SEC Women's Outdoor (2007, 2008, 2010, 2011, 2012); SEC Women's Indoor (2008, 2011); NJCAA Women's Indoor (1998, 1990, 1991); NJCAA Women's Outdoor (1986, 1990, 1991); NJCAA Women's Cross Country (1986, 1990)

Awards
- NCAA Women's Outdoor Coach of the Year (2008, 2012); SEC Women's Coach of the Year - 7 times; National Junior College Coach of the Year, Indoor & Outdoor - 7 times; Kansas Collegiate Coach of the Year - 6 times

Dennis Shaver is the current track and field coach at Louisiana State University. Shaver came to LSU in 1995 as an assistant coach. Since his arrival, he has coached 22 Olympians, 6 Olympic medalists, 411 All-Americans, 39 individual National Champions, 49 NCAA event titles and 19 national championship relay teams.

He began his college coaching career at Hutchinson Community College in Hutchinson, Kansas, in 1981 as an assistant football and track coach. In 1982, he became the head coach for the track team at Hutchinson Community College. He left Hutchinson in 1985 to become the head track coach at Barton Community College, where he had tremendous success. During his last year there, he became the first coach to ever win the NJCAA "triple crown" winning the cross-country, indoor, and outdoor titles. After Barton, Shaver became an assistant at Auburn University for the next three years before arriving in Baton Rouge in 1995 as an assistant coach. In 2004, he replaced Pat Henry as head track and field coach.

== Yearly results ==
Program	Season	Men's Indoor		Men's Outdoor		Women's Indoor		Women's Outdoor	
Program	Season	Conf.	NCAA	Conf.	NCAA	Conf.	NCAA	Conf.	NCAA
LSU	2005	6	26	5	3	3	6	6	24(t)
LSU	2006	4	2	4	2	7	7	4	7(t)
LSU	2007	4	10	2	2	3	2	1	2
LSU	2008	2	4	2	2(t)	1	2	1	1^{†}
LSU	2009	6	4	3	5	2	6	2	6
LSU	2010	3	4	2	6	3	3	1	6
LSU	2011	3	4	4	4	1	3	1	3
LSU	2012	4	5	2	2	2	3	1	1^{†X}
LSU	2013	5	15	4	7	2	3	2	4
LSU	2014	10	8(t)	6	4(t)	6	12(t)	8	6
LSU	2015	5	7	4	4	5	9	4	11
LSU	2016	5(t)	4	4	5	2	14(t)	5	6
LSU	2017	8	18(t)	7	7(t)	2	6	2	7(t)
LSU	2018	11	26	8	8	4	6	2	6
LSU	2019	3	3	1	7	5	15(t)	5	3

† - National Coach of the Year honors
X - Vacated National Championship

== Personal life ==
He graduated from the University of Texas at Arlington in 1979 with a bachelor's degree in physical education. He later earned a master's degree in education administration from Stephen F. Austin State University in 1981.

== See also ==
- LSU Tigers track and field
- LSU Lady Tigers track and field
- LSU Tigers cross country
- LSU Lady Tigers cross country
