= Bernie Moore Track Stadium =

Sports venue in Louisiana, United States

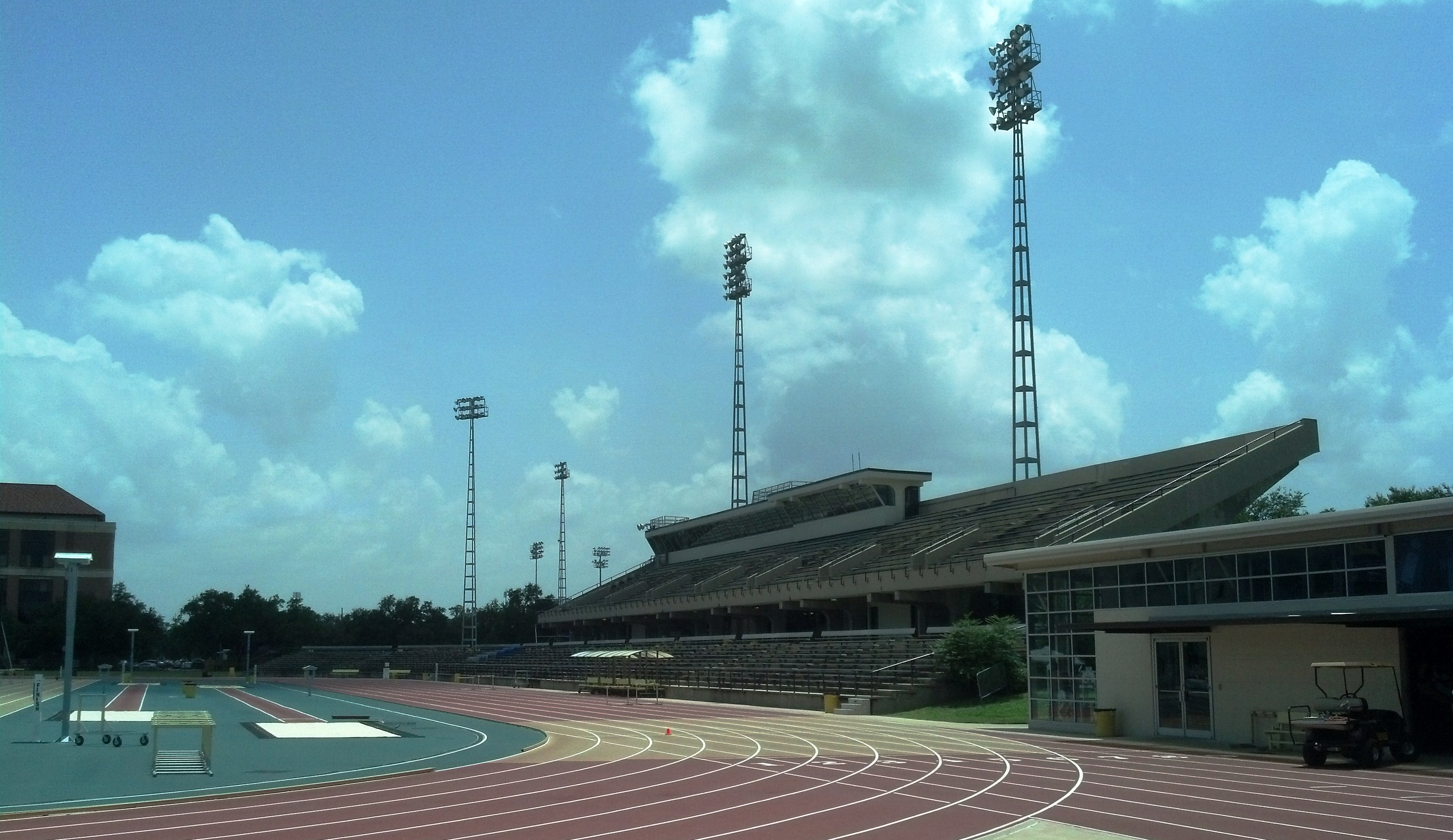
- Interactive map of Bernie Moore Track Stadium
- Location: Nicholson Drive; Baton Rouge, Louisiana 70803; USA
- Coordinates: 30.41452°N 91.18578°W
- Owner: Louisiana State University
- Operator: LSU Athletics Department
- Capacity: 5,680

Construction
- Opened: 1969

Tenants
- LSU Tigers track and field (NCAA); LSU Lady Tigers track and field (NCAA)

The Bernie Moore Track Stadium is an outdoor track and field facility located on the campus of Louisiana State University in Baton Rouge, LA. The facility, built in 1969, serves as the outdoor home of the LSU Tigers track and field team and the LSU Lady Tigers track and field team. The stadium has a seating capacity of 5,680. In 1971, the facility was renamed after former LSU football and track & field coach, Bernie Moore. Moore coached the LSU Track and Field teams for 18 years (1930–47) and led the Tigers to their first NCAA National Championship in 1933 as well as 12 SEC crowns.

In 2012, LSU's Bernie Moore Track Stadium was recognized as the 2012 Outdoor Track Facility of the Year by the American Sports Builders Association as part of its annual awards program for facilities built by ASBA members that best exemplify construction excellence.

Bernie Moore Track Stadium hosted the 1973 NCAA University Division Outdoor Track and Field Championships.

== Bernie Moore Track Stadium weight room ==
Opened in January 2003, the weight room is for the LSU Tigers track and field and LSU Lady Tigers track and field team's. The LSU track and field weight room is a 2,000-square-foot facility designed for an Olympic-style lifting program. Located adjacent to the track, the weight room features 10 multi-purpose power stations, 5 dumbbell stations, 4 power racks, 5 sets of competition plates, 10 competition Olympic bars, 2 multi-purpose racks, an assortment of selectorized machines, and 2 televisions for multimedia presentations.

== Gallery ==
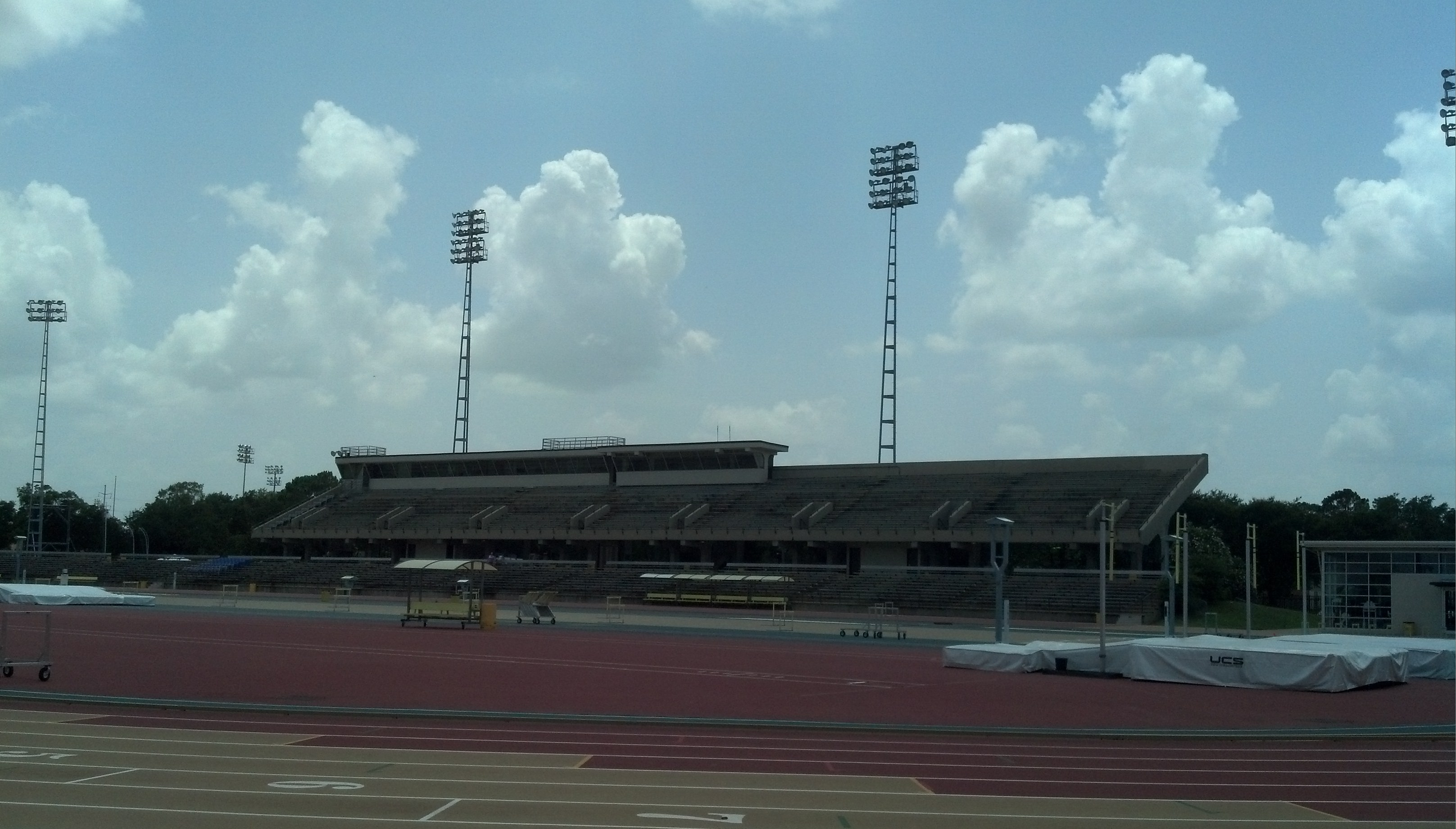
Bernie Moore Track Stadium

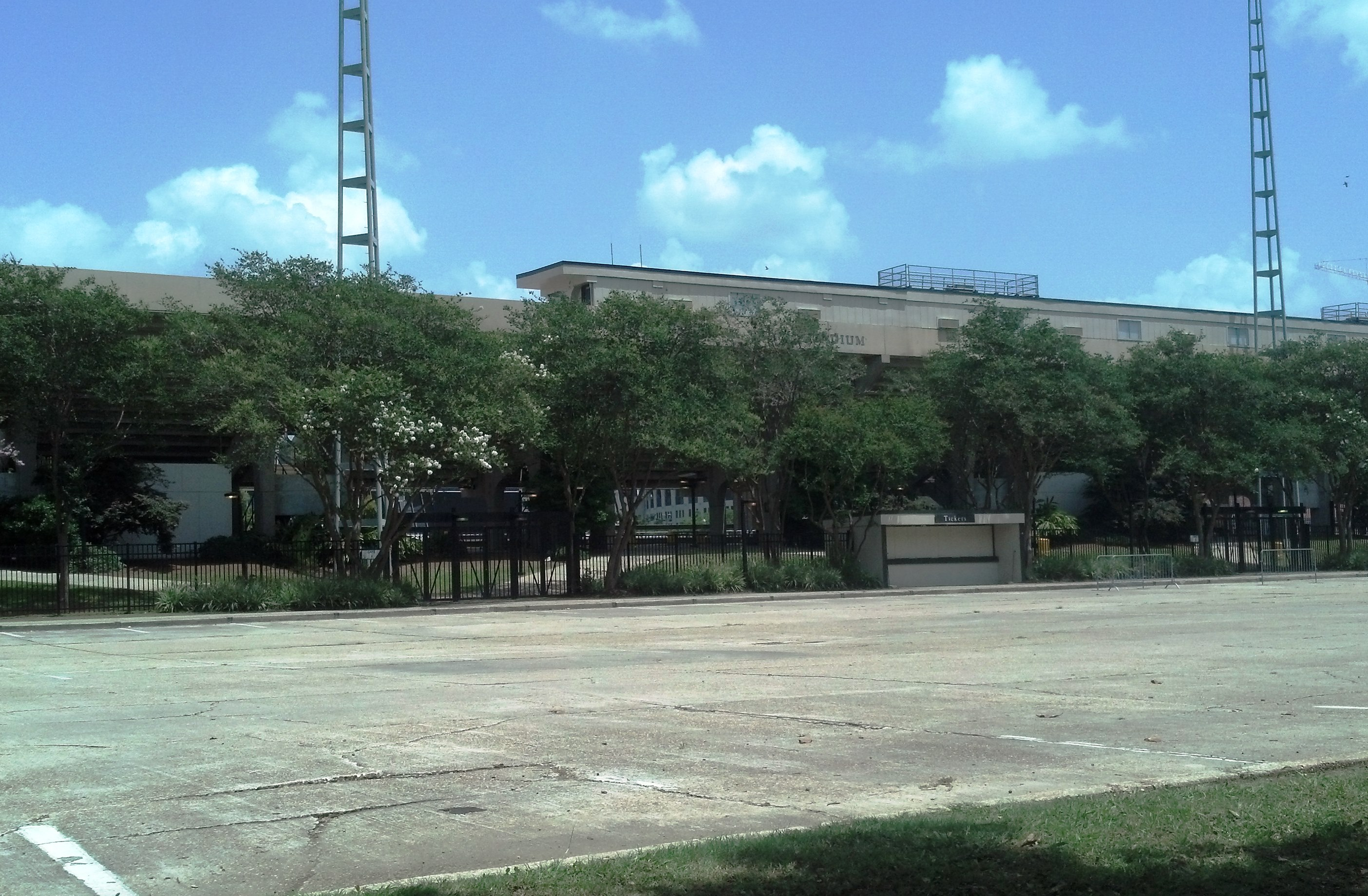
Bernie Moore Track Stadium Exterior

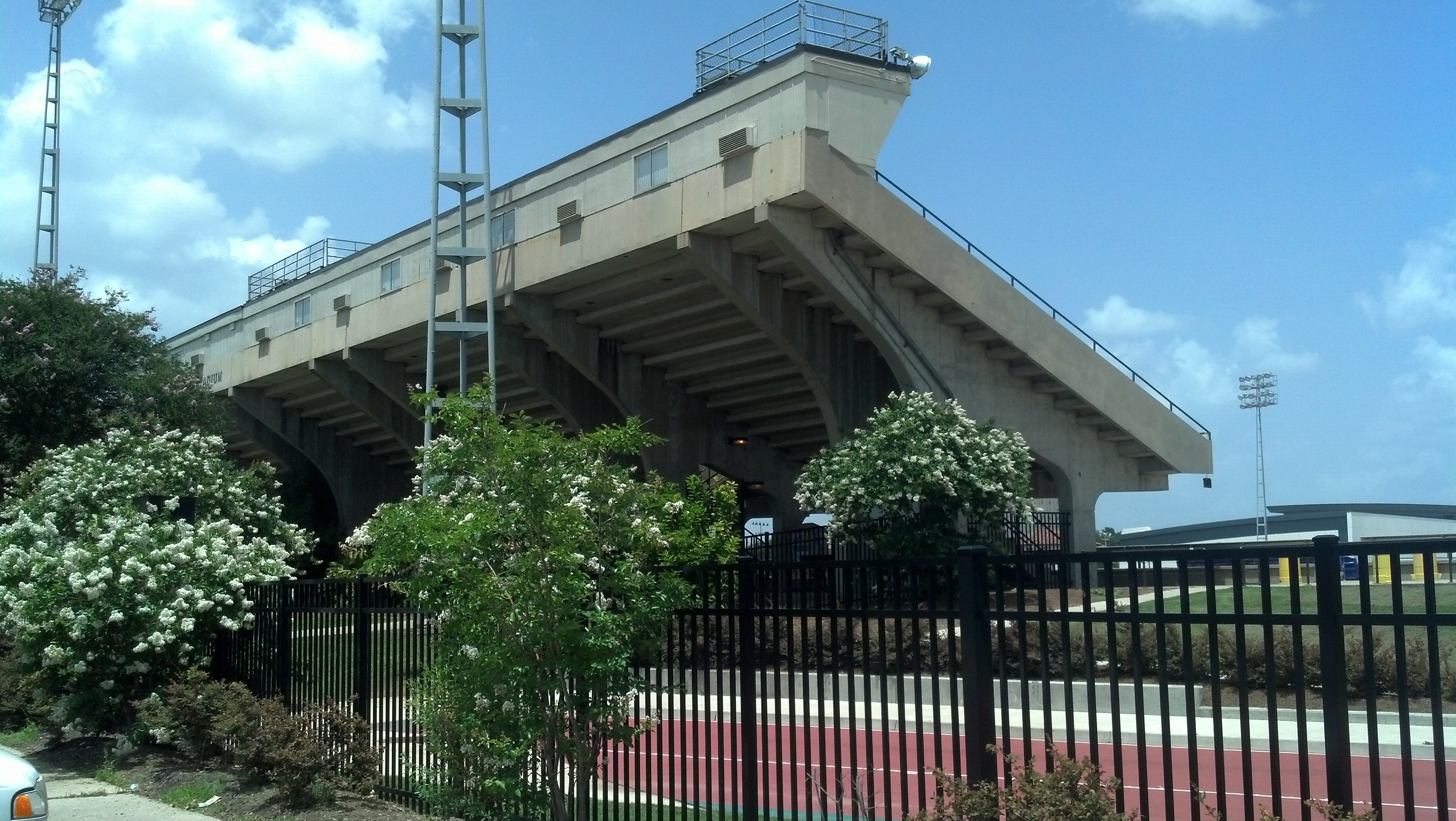
Bernie Moore Track Stadium - Home Grandstand

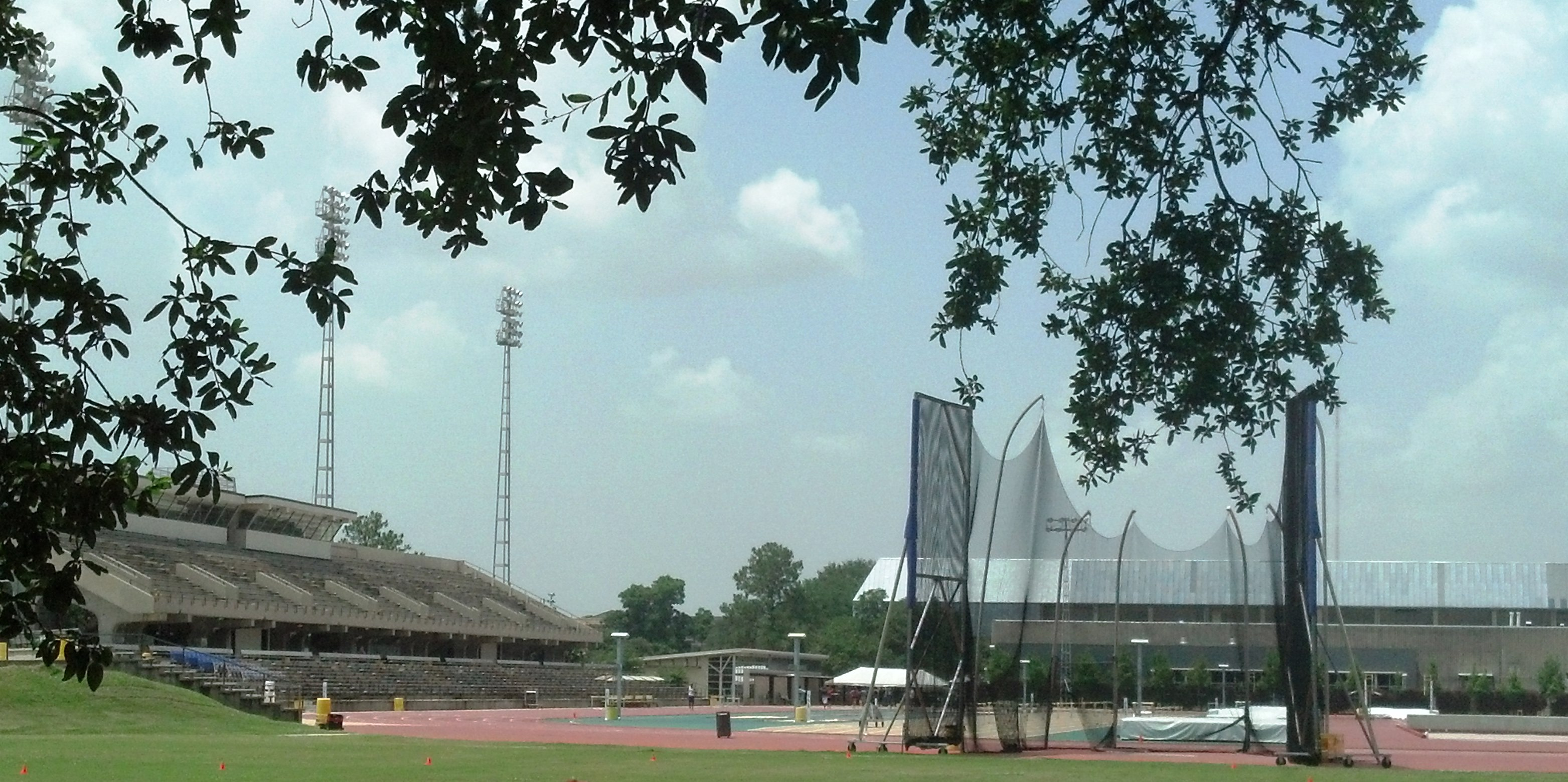
Bernie Moore Track Stadium - Track

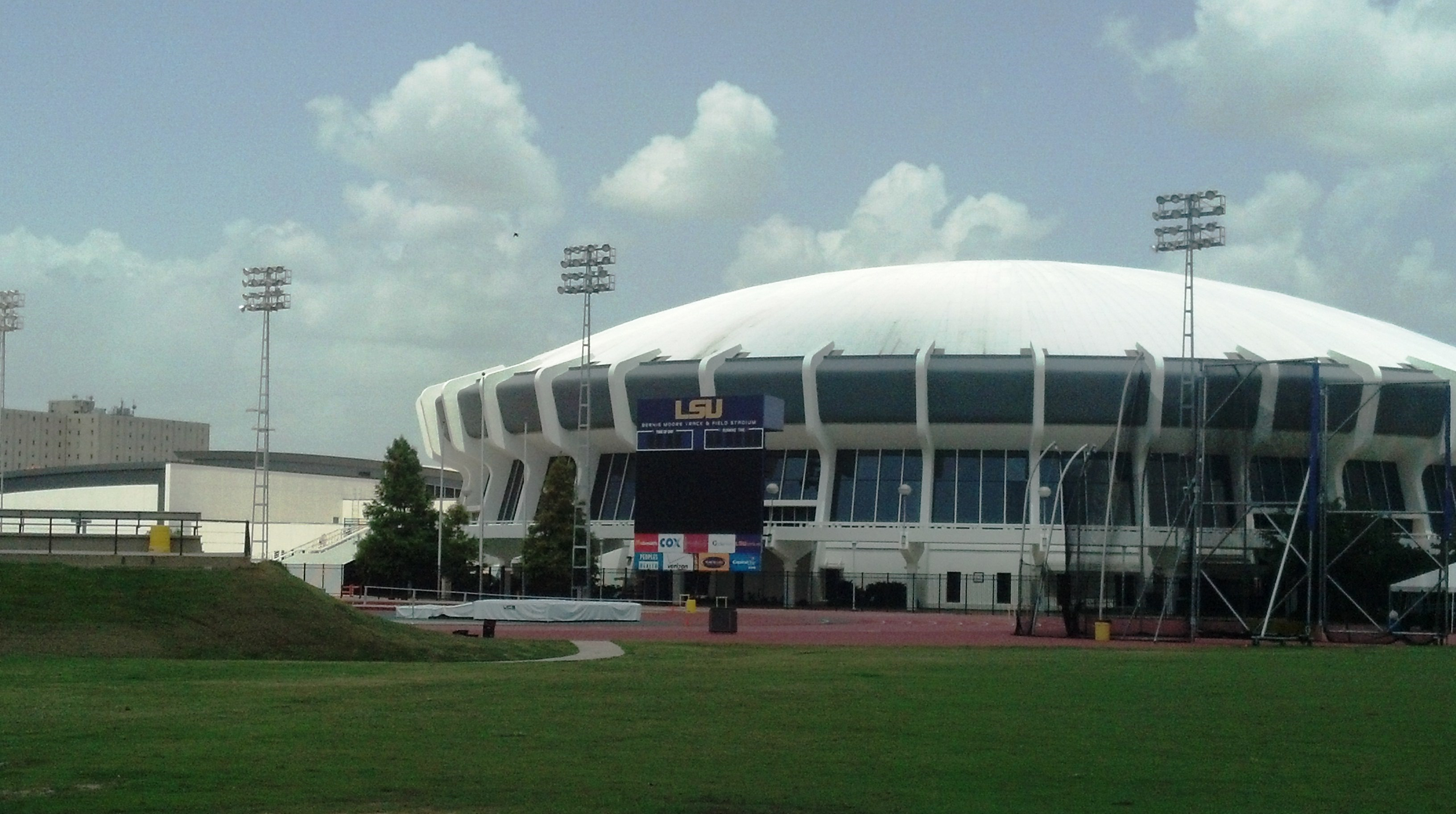
Bernie Moore Track Stadium - Field Area

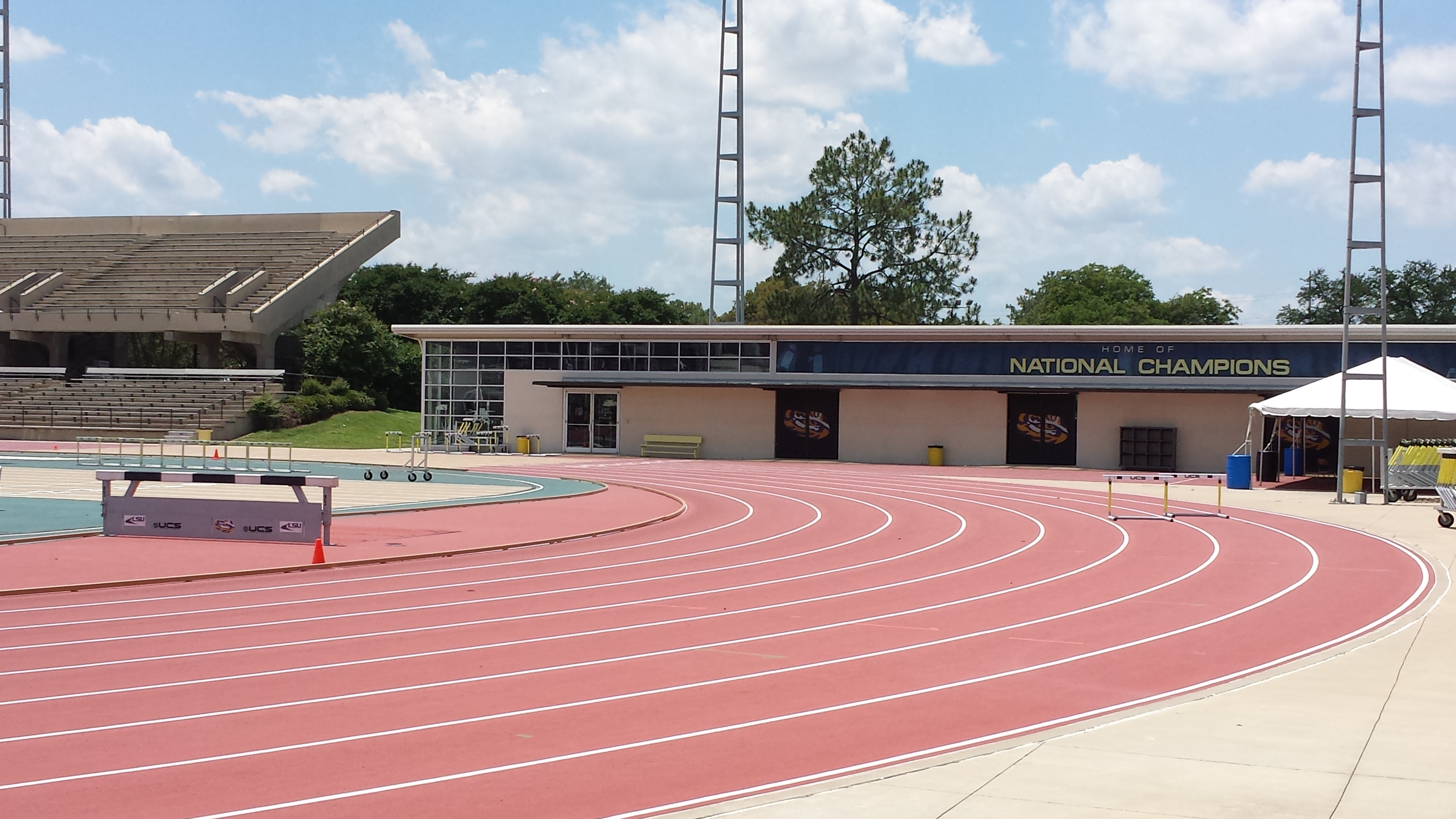
Bernie Moore Track Stadium weight room

== See also ==
- Carl Maddox Field House
- LSU Tigers track and field
- LSU Lady Tigers track and field
- LSU Tigers and Lady Tigers
