= Sheila Echols =

American athlete

Personal information
- Full name: Sheila Ann Echols
- Born: October 2, 1964 (age 61) Memphis, Tennessee, U.S.
Medal record
Women's athletics
Representing United States
Olympic Games
Gold medal – first place	1988 Seoul	4 × 100 metres relay
World Championships
Silver medal – second place	1993 Stuttgart	4 × 100 metres relay
World Cup
Gold medal – first place	1989 Barcelona	100 metres
Bronze medal – third place	1989 Barcelona	4 × 100 metres relay
Pan American Games
Gold medal – first place	1987 Indianapolis	4 × 100 metres relay

Sheila Ann Echols (born October 2, 1964) is a retired track and field athlete from the United States who competed in the 100 metres and the long jump. She won a gold medal at the 1988 Olympic Games in the 4 × 100 m relay. She also won the 1989 IAAF World Cup 100 m title.

== Career ==
Echols was born in Memphis, Tennessee, USA. At the 1988 Olympic Games in Seoul, South Korea, she won a gold medal in the 4 × 100 metres relay, alongside teammates Alice Brown, 100 m gold medalist Florence Griffith Joyner and 100 m silver medalist Evelyn Ashford. They ran 41.98 seconds. She was also an international long jumper and competed in that event at two Olympics. In Seoul, she failed to qualify for the final, placing 16th with a jump of 6.37m. In 1992, at the Olympic Games in Barcelona, she placed 7th in the final with a jump of 6.62m. She won a silver medal in the sprint relay at the 1993 World Championships, where she ran in the heats but not the final. Her biggest individual success came when she won the 1989 World Cup 100 metres title ahead of Mary Onyali and Reigning World Champion Silke Gladisch-Moller. Her 100 metres personal best of 10.83 was achieved at the 1988 US Olympic Trials.

Echols ran track collegiately at Louisiana State University.

== Personal bests ==
- Long jump — 6.94 m (1987)
- 100 metres — 10.83 (1988)
