= National Association of Collegiate Directors of Athletics =

The National Association of Collegiate Directors of Athletics (NACDA) is a professional non-profit organization for college and university athletic directors in the United States. NACDA boasts a membership of more than 6,100 individuals and more than 1,600 institutions throughout the United States, Canada and Mexico. Members include athletics directors, associate and assistant athletics directors, conference commissioners, and affiliate individuals or corporations.

== History ==
The National Association of Collegiate Directors of Athletics was founded in 1965. It had its origins at the First and Second National Conferences on Athletic Administration in Colleges and Universities, held in Louisville, Kentucky, in 1959 and 1962. At the third conference, in 1965, in Washington, D.C., NACDA was officially founded and the Association held its inaugural Convention in 1966.

== Organization ==
NACDA is governed by a group of Officers and executive committee members. The Officers consist of a President, a 1st, 2nd and 3rd Vice President and a Secretary. The Finance-Management Committee consists of the current Officers and Past Presidents who conduct the finances of the Association. The executive committee includes eight representatives each from the college and University Divisions, four from the Junior/Community College Division and several At-Large members. This latter group includes five representatives of affiliated associations/organizations and female representatives from districts which do not have female representation.

== Awards ==
- NACDA Directors' Cup
- James J. Corbett Memorial Award
- NACDA/NIT Athletics Directors Award
- Awards for Administrative Excellence
- NACDA/USOC Collegiate Olympic Coaches
- NACDA/SMI Honorary Degree
- NACDA Lifetime Achievement Award
- NACDA Merit of Honor Award
- Under Armour AD of the Year Award
- Special Recognition of Service to NACDA

== Hall of fame ==
See footnote and Hall of fame

== Past presidents ==
The following table lists the past presidents of the NACDA.

Years	President	Institution
1965–1966	Jim Corbett	Louisiana State University
1966–1967	Dick Larkins	Ohio State University
1967–1968	Bob Bronzan	San Jose State University
1968–1969	Marsh Turner	Johns Hopkins University
1969–1970	Bill Orwig	Indiana University
1970–1971	Albert W. Twitchell	Rutgers University
1971–1972	James "Bud" Jack	University of Utah
1972–1973	Cecil Coleman	University of Illinois
1973–1974	John Winkin	Colby College
1974–1975	Harry Fouke	University of Houston
1975–1976	Bill Rohr	Ohio University
1976–1977	Stan Marshall	South Dakota State University
1977–1978	Bill Flynn	Boston College
1978–1979	Fred Miller	Arizona State University
1979–1980	Ben Carnevale	The College of William and Mary
1980–1981	John Toner	University of Connecticut
1981–1982	Mike Lude	University of Washington
1982–1983	George King	Purdue University
1983–1984	Bob Karnes	Drake University
1984–1985	John J. Clune	United States Air Force Academy
1985–1986	Andy Mooradian	University of New Hampshire
1986–1987	Homer Rice	Georgia Tech
1987–1988	Carl Miller	University of the Pacific
1988–1989	Gary Cunningham	Fresno State University
1989–1990	Jack Lengyel	United States Naval Academy
1990–1991	Frank Windegger	Texas Christian University
1991–1992	Bill Byrne	University of Oregon
1992–1993	Jim Jones	Ohio State University
1993–1994	John Swofford	University of North Carolina
1994–1995	Eugene Smith	Iowa State University
1995–1996	Jim Copeland	Southern Methodist University
1996–1997	Barbara Hedges	University of Washington
1997–1998	Vince Dooley	University of Georgia
1998–1999	Jim Livengood	University of Arizona
1999–2000	Dave Hart Jr.	Florida State University
2000–2001	Debbie Yow	University of Maryland, College Park
2001–2002	Bill Bradshaw	DePaul University
2002–2003	Joe Castiglione	University of Oklahoma
2003–2004	Judy Rose	University of North Carolina at Charlotte
2004–2005	Gene DeFilippo	Boston College
2005–2006	Tim Curley	Penn State University
2006–2007	Lee McElroy	University at Albany
2007–2008	Kevin White	University of Notre Dame
2008–2009	Joan Cronan	University of Tennessee
2009–2010	Randy Spetman	Florida State University
2010–2011	Dave Roach	Colgate University
2011–2012	Dan Guerrero	UCLA
2012–2013	Kevin Anderson	University of Maryland
2013–2014	Mike Alden	University of Missouri
2014–2015	Jim Phillips	Northwestern University
2015–2016	Tim Selgo	Grand Valley State University
2016–2017	Chris Plonsky	University of Texas
2017–2018	Bubba Cunningham	University of North Carolina
2018–2019	Lee Reed	Georgetown University
2019–2020	Greg Byrne	University of Alabama
2020–2021	Warde Manuel	University of Michigan
2021–2022	Jamie Pollard	Iowa State University
2022–2023	Rick Hart	Southern Methodist University
2023–2024	Patrick Chun	Washington
2024–2025	Ross Bjork	Ohio State University
2025–2026	Sean Frazier	Northern Illinois University

== See also ==
- College Sports Communicators
