= Cohen v. Brown University =

1992 US lawsuit over Title IX discrimination

- Court: United States Court of Appeals for the First Circuit
- Started: April 1992
- Decided: November 21, 1996
- Citation: 101 F.3d 155

The case of Cohen v. Brown University challenged cost-cutting efforts Brown University made in 1991 that targeted women's sports and women's interest in sports. Plaintiffs in this case alleged that Brown was maintaining a history of discriminatory treatments of women in their intercollegiate athletics program, and as such was violating Title IX legislation—a federal civil rights law that prohibits discrimination based on sex in educational program.

== Description ==
Cohen v. Brown University was a legal case that challenged cost-cutting efforts Brown University made in 1991 that targeted women's sports and women's interest in sports. Women's volleyball and gymnastics teams were demoted from university-funded varsity status to donor-funded club varsity status, along with the men's water polo and golf teams.

Plaintiffs Amy Cohen and other affected female athletes file a class action lawsuit against the university, alleging that even though both men's and women's teams were moved down to donor-funded teams, this action maintained Brown's history of discriminatory treatments of women in their intercollegiate athletics program and as such was violating Title IX legislation.

=== Facts of the case ===
In 1991, Brown University announced that it would shift four varsity athletics teams including two men's and two women's from university-funded to donor-funded status. Subsequently, gymnast Amy Cohen and twelve other female student-athletes filed a class-action lawsuit against Brown University in 1992. The case, presided over by District Court Judge Raymond James Pettine and concluded in 1995, alleged gender-based discrimination in the allocation of funds for men's and women's sports.

The plaintiffs contended that Brown University's athletic department displayed an unjust preference for men's sports in the allocation of federal funds, even though women made up forty-eight percent of the overall enrollment. Despite representing forty-eight percent of the enrollment, women were granted only thirty-seven percent of athletic opportunities, as highlighted in the book "Title IX and fifty years of fighting sex discrimination" by Sherry Boschert.

The defense contended that athletic funds were allocated based on the interests of those interested in sports, asserting a defense of reverse discrimination. They argued that women lacked the same level of interest in sports as men, justifying the disparate funding for men's and women's teams. Defendants included Brown University, Vartan Gregorian, and David Roach.

The plaintiffs sought a preliminary injunction to immediately reinstate the affected women's athletics teams to university-funded status. This relief was granted, compelling Brown University to restore the demoted women's teams and prohibiting further elimination or demotion of existing women's varsity teams. The injunction, issued by Judge Pettine, remained in effect indefinitely This injunction was upheld indefinitely in the 1995 decision by Judge Pettine.

Brown University's first attempt to appeal proved unsuccessful, as the trial continued for two and a half months before reaching a partial settlement agreement. The agreement recognized the funding disparities between university-funded men's and women's teams. However, it fell short of adequately addressing the broader inequalities in the treatment of female athletes.

The court determined that Brown University breached Title IX by not acknowledging and catering to the needs of female athletes, failing to ensure equal treatment, insufficiently expanding opportunities for women, and neglecting to rectify shortcomings within the athletic department. Brown had 120 days to submit a compliance plan, later reduced to 60 days, but failed to do so, resulting in several women's sports being reinstated to university-funded status.

Despite an appeal by Brown University, the appellate court upheld the lower court's factual findings but remanded the specific relief for reconsideration. In response, Brown proposed a new compliance plan, which included increasing women's athletic opportunities and eliminating men's positions to align with enrollment proportions. The settlement was agreed upon, and various provisions were established.

The court sided with the plaintiffs, permitting them to file a fee application. Brown objected to the fees, resulting in a directive for the defense to cover more than $1 million in attorney's fees and expenses, along with an extra $250,000 for challenging the fees. Despite initially disputing this ruling, Brown ultimately settled.

=== Decision ===
The resolution of Cohen v. Brown University occurred officially in 1996, and the appellate judge, in alignment with the plaintiffs, delivered the judgment; it determined that Brown University had breached Title IX regulations by discontinuing university funding for the women's gymnastics and volleyball teams. In a subsequent attempt in 2020, Brown University sought to eliminate several university-funded athletic teams, triggering additional legal actions linked to the original 1992 Cohen v. Brown University case.

== Title IX overview ==
Title IX is a federal civil rights law that prohibits discrimination based on sex in educational programs. All education programs ranging from elementary to college levels that receive federal funding are included in this law, and as such can face consequences should they violate it. Passed with the Education Amendments of 1972, the 37 words that make up Title IX set a precedent that has paved the way for the setup and success of future civil rights movements based in gender and other types of discrimination.

== Case timeline ==
=== 1991 ===
- Brown University eliminates the four athletic teams

=== 1992 ===
- April: Amy Cohen and other affected female athletes file a class action lawsuit against the university.
- May: Defense files a motion to dismiss the case.
- July: Plaintiffs file a motion for preliminary injunction.
- August: Defense's motion to dismiss is denied by the court.
- October: Bench hearing held by Judge Pettine on the matter of the preliminary injunction.
- December 22: Preliminary injunction granted by the court.
- December 29: Brown files an appeal and the appellate court grants a stay on the injunction.

=== 1993 ===
- April: The First Circuit Court of Appeals affirmed the District Court's decision on granting the preliminary injunction.

=== 1994 ===
- September: Trial on the merits begins.
- December: Partial settlement agreement is reached between the parties

=== 1995 ===
- March: Court opinion and order issued found that Brown University was in violation of Title IX and it failed to provide equal treatment to all athletes.
- April: Brown appeals the court's ruling
- May: District Court orders a modified order that required Brown to submit a plan of compliance within 60 days
- August: Brown ordered to elevate several women's sports to university-funded status.
- September: Final judgment of the court entered and Brown's motion for additional findings is denied. Brown appeals the decision
- November: Appellate court found no error in the district court's findings and application of laws. The appellate court did find error in the district court's award of relief and referred it back to the district court for reconsideration.

=== 1997 ===
- April: Brown submits a new compliance plan to the district court

=== 1998 ===
- June: Parties reach settlement agreement on outstanding issues and it is approved by the court
- October: Court enters judgment in favor of the plaintiffs
- December: Plaintiffs submit fee application seeking attorney's fees. Brown contests the fees.

=== 2001 ===
- December: New judge grants attorney fees

=== 2003 ===
- Judge grants additional funding for the fees incurred by the plaintiffs during the fee contest. Brown appeals, and settles.

== Issues ==
This case involved issues stemming from a change in the classifications of women's sports teams, discriminatory funding practices on the part of Brown University, and sex-based discrimination in athletics. The questions this case, and its subsequent appeals, sought to answer were: are Title IX regulations being interpreted in a way that upholds the law and contributes to equitable athletic opportunities for men and women, and are the practices being used at Brown University a violation of federal Title IX laws?

== Importance ==
This case set a precedent when it came to equal opportunities in the intercollegiate athletic community. This landmark case set the foundation for how universities around the United States should be creating and maintaining equal athletic and academic opportunities for male and female athletes. Since its implementation, Title IX has led to the elimination of dozens of male collegiate athletic teams to create equal opportunities for their female counterparts. In doing so, the world of athletics has risen to an entirely new level. From intercollegiate athletics to the Olympics, there has never been a larger female presence on the stage. Establishing and upholding Title IX protections has created nearly unlimited opportunities for young female athletes to not only chase academic and athletic careers, but to be seen and supported while doing so.

== See also ==
- Soenen et al v. Brown
