= Corbett Award =

US award for athletics administrators

The James J. Corbett Memorial Award is a US award given annually by the National Association of Collegiate Directors of Athletics (NACDA). It is presented "to the collegiate administrator who through the years has most typified Corbett's devotion to intercollegiate athletics and worked unceasingly for its betterment." The award is named after former Louisiana State University athletics director and first president of the NACDA, James J. Corbett. It has been presented annually since 1967.

== Winners ==
The following individuals have won the Corbett Award.

Year	Winner	Institution
1967	Bernie Moore	Southeastern Conference
1968	Fritz Crisler	University of Michigan
1969	Asa Bushnell	Eastern College Athletic Conference
1970	Dick Larkins	Ohio State University
1971	Tom Hamilton	Pacific-8 Conference
1972	William R. Reed	Big Ten Conference
1973	Ernie McCoy	University of Miami
1974	Al Twitchell	Rutgers University
1975	Jess Hill	Pacific Coast Athletic Association
1976	Walter Byers	NCAA
1977	Robert Kane	United States Olympic Committee
1978	Bill Orwig	Indiana University
1979	Harry Fouke	University of Houston
1980	Stan Bates	Western Athletic Conference
1981	William J. Flynn	Boston College
1982	Edgar A. Sherman	Muskingum College
1983	Wiles Hallock	Pacific-10 Conference
1984	James "Bud" Jack	University of Utah
1985	Cecil Coleman	Midwestern City Conference, University of Illinois
1986	Carl Maddox	Mississippi State University, Louisiana State University
1987	John Toner	University of Connecticut
1988	Mike Lude	University of Washington
1989	Scotty Whitelaw	Eastern College Athletic Conference
1990	George King	Purdue University
1991	Joseph Kearney	Western Athletic Conference
1992	Homer Rice	Georgia Institute of Technology
1993	LeRoy Walker	United States Olympic Committee
1994	Dick Schultz	NCAA
1995	Elizabeth Kruczek	Fitchburg State College
1996	Carl James	Big Eight Conference
1997	Gene Corrigan	Atlantic Coast Conference
1998	James Frank	Southwestern Athletic Conference
1999	Chuck Neinas	College Football Association, NCAA, Big Eight Conference
2000	Cedric Dempsey	NCAA
2001	Jack Lengyel	United States Naval Academy
2002	Roy Kramer	Southeastern Conference
2003	Gary Cunningham	University of California Santa Barbara
2004	Vince Dooley	University of Georgia
2005	Bob Bronzan	San Jose State University
2006	Judy Sweet	NCAA
2007	Fred L. Miller	Arizona State University, Long Beach State University, San Diego State University
2008	Dave Hart, Jr.	East Carolina University, Florida State University
2009	Andy Mooradian	University of New Hampshire
2010	Barbara Hedges	University of Washington
2011	John Swofford	Atlantic Coast Conference
2012	Frank Windegger	Texas Christian University
2013	Jim Jones	Ohio State University
2014	Bill Byrne	Texas A&M University, University of Nebraska–Lincoln, University of Oregon
2015	Carl Miller	University of the Pacific, University of North Dakota, University of South Dakota
2016	Gene Smith	Ohio State University
2017	Don Tencher	Rhode Island College
2018	Joan Cronan	University of Tennessee
2019	Debbie Yow	North Carolina State University, University of Maryland, Saint Louis University
2020	Jim Livengood	Arizona University
2021	Judy Rose	University of North Carolina Charlotte
2022	Dan Guerrero	University of California, Los Angeles
2023	Bill Bradshaw	La Salle University
2024	Gene DeFilippo	Boston College
2025	Kevin M. White	Duke University
