= Joseph Kearney =

American athletics coach and administrator (1927–2010)

Biographical details
- Born: April 28, 1927; Pittsburgh, Pennsylvania, U.S.
- Died: May 5, 2010 (aged 83); Tucson, Arizona, U.S.

Playing career
- late 1940s: Seattle Pacific

Administrative career (AD unless noted)
- 1969–1976: Washington
- 1976–1980: Michigan State
- 1980: Arizona State
- 1980–1994: WAC (commissioner)

Joseph L. Kearney (April 28, 1927 – May 5, 2010) was an American coach and sports administrator in university athletics. He served as athletic director at three major universities: the University of Washington (1969–1976), Michigan State University (1976–1980), and Arizona State University (1980). He was commissioner of the Western Athletic Conference (WAC) from 1980 until his retirement in 1994.

== Career ==
After serving in the United States Navy during World War II, Kearney attended Seattle Pacific University and attained his BA degree in history. He was also a member of the SPU basketball team. This was then followed by teaching and coaching stints in Paradise High School (Paradise, California); the University of Washington (as assistant basketball coach for Tippy Dye) and Sunnyside High School (Sunnyside, Washington). He then became a high school principal in the state of Washington when he was hired by Onalaska High School (Onalaska, Washington), where he also taught and coached. In 1961, he was appointed as the inaugural principal at Tumwater High School in Tumwater, Washington. He concurrently pursued and completed a master's degree in education at San Jose State University and moved back to the University of Washington to finish his PhD, where he was also strongly linked to the UW Athletic Department and quickly rose to the rank of assistant athletic director under Jim Owens, who was Washington's football coach and athletic director when Kearney joined the Athletic Department. From this position, he was appointed athletic director for the University of Washington when Owens decided to focus solely on his job as football coach.

In addition to the above roles, Kearney also served as the Assistant Executive Director of the Washington Interscholastic Activities Association (WIAA). For 16 years he served the United States Olympic Committee (USOC) as a committee member and later as a USOC Committee Chairman. He was then named to the USOC Board of Directors and in 1996 he was awarded the USOC Olympic Torch Award.

In the 1978–79 season at Michigan State University, his teams captured the Big Ten Conference titles in football, basketball and baseball—the so-called triple crown. The 1978–79 Michigan State Spartans men's basketball team, led by future NBA Hall of Fame forward Magic Johnson, defeated Indiana State (led by fellow future NBA Hall of Famer Larry Bird) in the title game of the 1979 NCAA Division I Basketball Tournament.

Kearney hired and worked with some of the most prominent coaches in university athletics, including Hall of Fame football player, Jim Owens, college football coaching hall of famer Don James (football), and Darryl Rogers in football. In basketball, he worked with three Naismith Memorial Basketball Hall of Fame inductees: Marv Harshman, Jud Heathcote and Tex Winter. In other sports he worked with such outstanding coaches as Dick Erickson and Bob Ernst in crew, Earl Ellis in swimming, Dr. Eric Hughes in gymnastics, Ken Shannon in track and field, the legendary Danny Litwhiler in baseball, Joe Baum in soccer, and Amo Bessone and Ron Mason in ice hockey. Bessone and Mason both won NCAA Men's Ice Hockey Championships, with Mason retiring with the all-time highest number of wins in Division One ice hockey. Mason was the athletic director at Michigan State University until his retirement in early 2008, when he was succeeded by Mark Hollis, who was basketball team manager on Jud Heathcote's staff at Michigan State and on Kearney's staff at the Western Athletic Conference.

== Honors ==
In 1991, Joe Kearney was nominated by the National Association of Collegiate Directors of Athletics (NACDA) to be its recipient of the Corbett Award, which is the highest honor in university sports administration. The Western Athletic Conference presents the Joe Kearney Award to the top male and female athlete each year—an award that has been given annually since the 1991–92 academic year. In July 2014, Kearney was selected for induction into the University of Washington Husky Hall of Fame. Further, in May 2020, Kearney was inducted into the State of Washington Sports Hall of Fame for his long career in high-school and university athletics within the state.

== Later life and family ==
Kearney retired to Tucson, Arizona, and lived there for 16 years with his wife, Dorothea Kearney (born January 3, 1927, in Shelton, Washington, deceased February 5, 2011, in Denver, Colorado). He was the father of five children (Jan Veile, Kevin Kearney, Erin Leary, Shawn Bassham and Robin Kearney) and had eleven grandchildren (Christopher Kearney; Katie Kearney; Nicholas Kearney; Emma Tanabe; Ryan Kearney; Aaron Bassham; Seth Bassham; Graham Veile; Laurel Sanford; Trey Howard and Adrianne Leary).

Kearney died on May 5, 2010, in Tucson, after an eight-month battle with pancreatic cancer.
