= 2018–19 College Football Playoff =

Postseason college football tournament

- Season: 2018
- Dates: December 29, 2018 – January 7, 2019
- Teams invited: (1) Alabama; (2) Clemson; (3) Notre Dame; (4) Oklahoma
- Venues: AT&T Stadium; Hard Rock Stadium; Levi's Stadium
- Champions: Clemson (2nd CFP title, 3rd overall title)

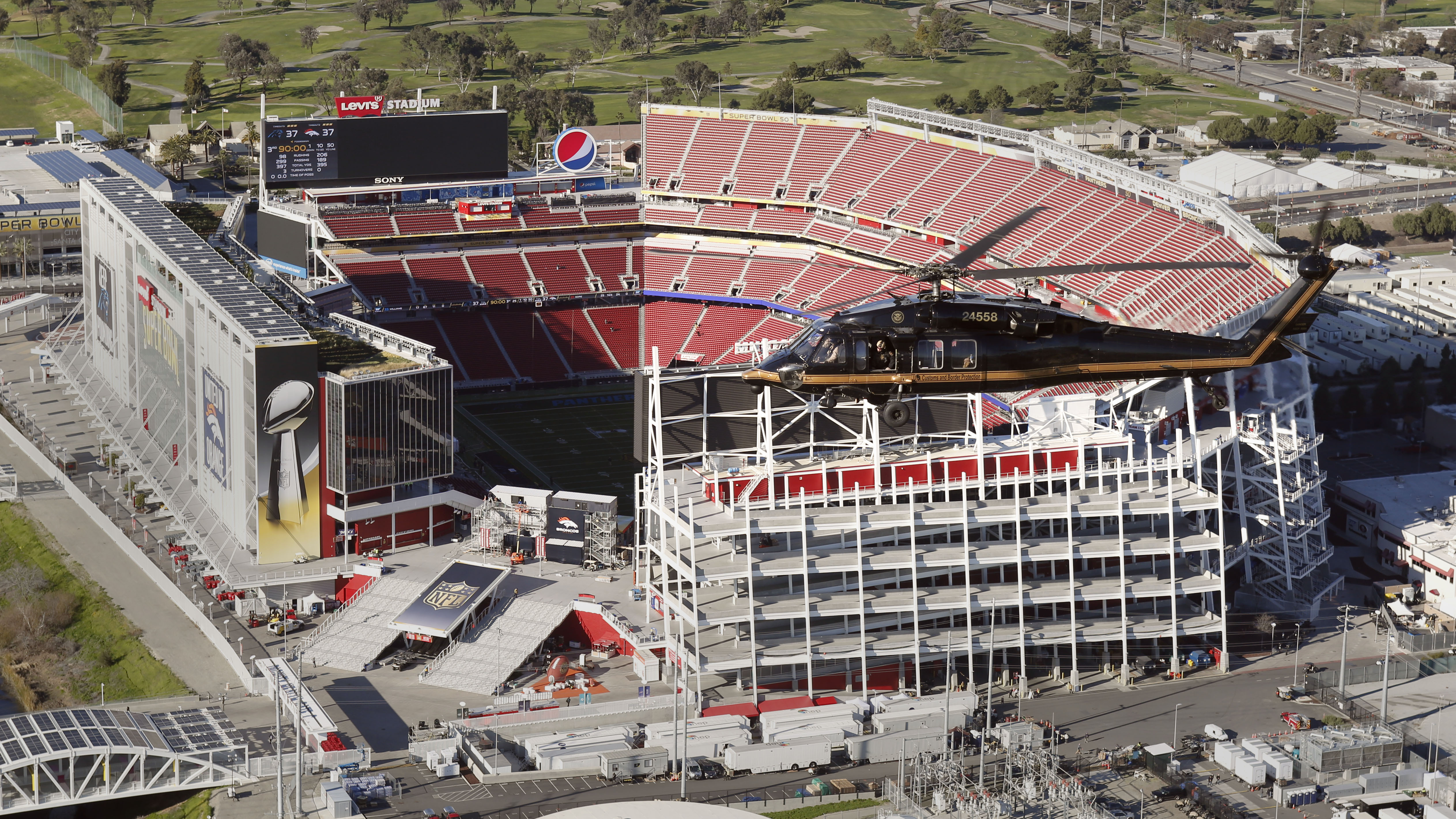
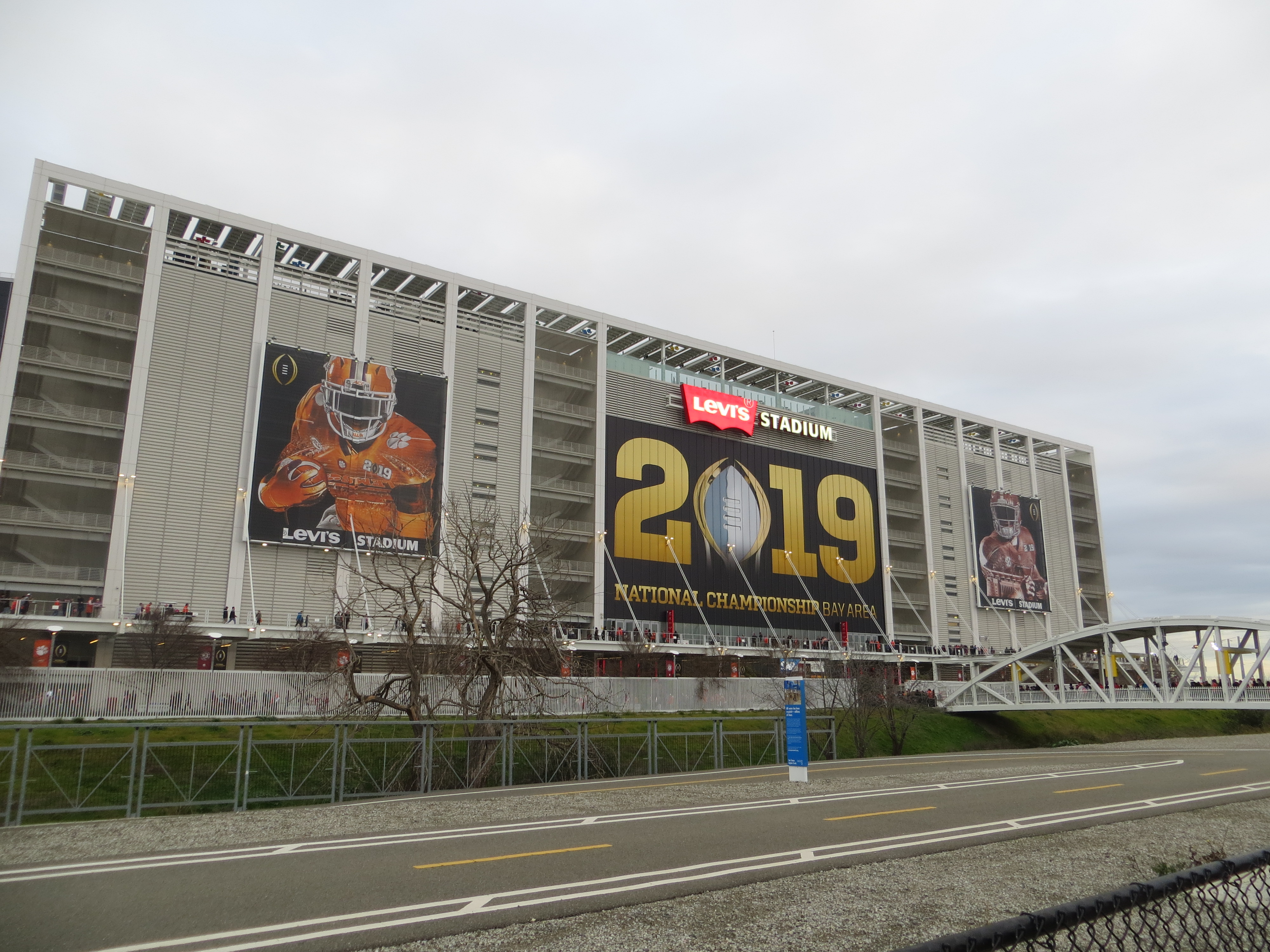
Levi's Stadium in Santa Clara, California, hosted the College Football Playoff National Championship.

The 2018–19 College Football Playoff was a single-elimination postseason tournament that determined the national champion of the 2018 NCAA Division I FBS football season. It was the fifth edition of the College Football Playoff (CFP) and involved the top four teams in the country as ranked by the College Football Playoff poll playing in two semifinals, with the winners of each advancing to the national championship game. Each participating team was the champion of its respective conference: No. 1 Alabama from the Southeastern Conference, No. 2 Clemson from the Atlantic Coast Conference, No. 3 Notre Dame, an FBS independent, and No. 4 Oklahoma from the Big 12 Conference.

The playoff bracket's semifinal games were held at the Cotton Bowl Classic and the Orange Bowl on December 29, 2018, part of the season's slate of bowl games. The Cotton Bowl semifinal saw Clemson defeat Notre Dame, 30–3, and the Orange Bowl semifinal saw Alabama defeat Oklahoma by eleven points. By virtue of their victories, Alabama and Clemson advanced to the national championship game, held on January 7 in Santa Clara, California. The title game was a rematch of the national championship games in 2016 and 2017 and the 2018 Sugar Bowl semifinal. In the championship game, Clemson defeated Alabama, 44–16, to win their second CFP national championship and their third national championship in school history.

Both semifinals were among the six most-watched cable broadcasts of the calendar year, with the Orange Bowl's 10.4 Nielsen rating narrowly topping the Cotton Bowl's 10.3 rating. Despite the 26.97 million national championship viewers, the game received the lowest rating of any national championship game since 2012.

== Bracket ==
Semifinals
December 29 – Orange Bowl Hard Rock Stadium, Miami Gardens
1	Alabama	45
4	Oklahoma	34
December 29 – Cotton Bowl AT&T Stadium, Arlington
2	Clemson	30
3	Notre Dame	3

Championship
January 7 – National Championship Levi's Stadium, Santa Clara
1	Alabama	16
2	Clemson	44

== Selection and teams ==
The 2018–19 CFP selection committee was chaired by Oregon athletic director Rob Mullens. Its other members were former Virginia Tech head coach Frank Beamer, former The Arizona Republic reporter Paola Boivin, former Southern Miss head coach Jeff Bower, Oklahoma athletic director Joe Castiglione, former Central Michigan athletic director Herb Deromedi, former head coach Ken Hatfield, Robert Morris University president Christopher B. Howard, former head coach Bobby Johnson, former NFL player Ronnie Lott, Ohio State athletic director Gene Smith, Georgia Tech athletic director Todd Stansbury, and Florida athletic director Scott Stricklin.

The season's first CFP rankings were released on October 30, 2018, with three conferences represented in the top six. No. 1 Alabama, No. 3 LSU, and No. 6 Georgia represented the Southeastern Conference (SEC), No. 2 Clemson represented the Atlantic Coast Conference (ACC), and No. 5 Michigan represented the Big Ten Conference. Also debuting in the top six was No. 4 Notre Dame, an FBS independent. The following week of games saw No. 1 Alabama shut out No. 3 LSU, dropping the Tigers to No. 7 and allowing Oklahoma to rise to No. 6. The top eight ranked teams did not change over the next two rankings releases on November 13 and 20, the latter of which saw UCF ranked No. 9, making them the first Group of Five team to earn a CFP top ten ranking. The final week of the regular season featured several games with implications for the penultimate rankings release; No. 8 Washington State fell to No. 16 Washington in the Apple Cup, No. 10 Ohio State defeated rival No. 4 Michigan, and No. 22 Texas A&M beat No. 7 LSU in a seven-overtime game that broke the FBS record for points scored in a game with 146. Accordingly, the November 27 rankings dropped Michigan to No. 7, with Georgia and Oklahoma each moving up one spot and Ohio State jumping from tenth to sixth. LSU and Washington State also dropped to Nos. 10 and 13, respectively.

Each conference played their championship the following week. No. 11 Washington was first to win their conference with a defeat of No. 17 Utah in the Pac-12 Championship on November 30. The next day, No. 1 Alabama defeated No. 4 Georgia in a rematch of the 2018 CFP national championship to win the SEC Championship. No. 2 Clemson beat Pittsburgh to win the ACC Championship and No. 6 Ohio State defeated No. 21 Northwestern to win the Big Ten Championship, both by at least three possessions. In the Big 12 Championship, No. 5 Oklahoma defeated No. 14 Texas, while No. 8 UCF beat Memphis to win the American Athletic Conference (AAC) Championship.

The final CFP rankings were released on December 2, 2018. Alabama, Clemson, and Notre Dame remained in the top three spots, and Oklahoma rose to No. 4 following Georgia's loss to earn the final playoff spot. Alabama and Oklahoma were assigned to the Orange Bowl semifinal, and Clemson and Notre Dame were assigned to the Cotton Bowl Classic semifinal. No. 5 Georgia was matched with No. 15 Texas in the Sugar Bowl, while No. 6 Ohio State was assigned to play No. 9 Washington in the 2019 Rose Bowl. In the final two New Year's Six games, No. 7 Michigan and No. 10 Florida were assigned to the Peach Bowl and AAC champion No. 8 UCF was sent to the Fiesta Bowl to play No. 11 LSU.

2018 College Football Playoff rankings top six progression
No.	Week 9	Week 10	Week 11	Week 12	Week 13	Final
1	Alabama (8–0)	Alabama (9–0)	Alabama (10–0)	Alabama (11–0)	Alabama (12–0)	Alabama (13–0)
2	Clemson (8–0)	Clemson (9–0)	Clemson (10–0)	Clemson (11–0)	Clemson (12–0)	Clemson (13–0)
3	LSU (7–1)	Notre Dame (9–0)	Notre Dame (10–0)	Notre Dame (11–0)	Notre Dame (12–0)	Notre Dame (12–0)
4	Notre Dame (8–0)	Michigan (8–1)	Michigan (9–1)	Michigan (10–1)	Georgia (11–1)	Oklahoma (12–1)
5	Michigan (7–1)	Georgia (8–1)	Georgia (9–1)	Georgia (10–1)	Oklahoma (11–1)	Georgia (11–2)
6	Georgia (7–1)	Oklahoma (8–1)	Oklahoma (9–1)	Oklahoma (10–1)	Ohio State (11–1)	Ohio State (12–1)

Key: Team increased ranking from previous week Team decreased ranking from previous week Team selected to College Football Playoff

== Playoff games ==
=== Semifinals ===
==== Cotton Bowl Classic ====
2018 Cotton Bowl Classic

Quarter	1	2	3	4	Total
No. 3 Notre Dame	3	0	0	0	3
No. 2 Clemson	3	20	7	0	30

at AT&T Stadium • Arlington, Texas

- Date: December 29, 2018
- Game time: 3:00 p.m. CST

The Cotton Bowl semifinal matched No. 2 Clemson and No. 3 Notre Dame in the teams' fourth meeting; it was their first matchup since 2015, and Clemson entered leading the series 2–1. The teams traded punts to begin the game, and the Clemson defense forced a fumble on the first play of Notre Dame's second drive which resulted in a field goal for the Tigers. Notre Dame answered with a 10-play drive which concluded with a 28-yard Justin Yoon field goal to tie the game. That play was the final scoring play of the game for the Fighting Irish, as the Tigers finished the game with 27 unanswered points following two touchdown passes from Trevor Lawrence to Justyn Ross, one pass to Tee Higgins, and a Travis Etienne rush. Following their first quarter field goal, Notre Dame recorded seven punts, an interception, and turnover on downs, and a drive that ended at halftime. The game concluded with a 30–3 Clemson victory, sending them to the national championship for the third time in four seasons.

==== Orange Bowl ====
2018 Orange Bowl

Quarter	1	2	3	4	Total
No. 4 Oklahoma	0	10	10	14	34
No. 1 Alabama	21	10	0	14	45

at Hard Rock Stadium • Miami Gardens, Florida

- Date: December 29, 2018
- Game time: 8:00 p.m. EST

Alabama and Oklahoma were paired in the Orange Bowl semifinal, marking the programs' sixth all-time meeting. Oklahoma entered the game leading the series 3–1–1 with a 1–1–1 split in three prior postseason matchups. Receiving the ball first, Alabama opened the game with touchdowns on each of their first four drives while Oklahoma recorded two punts and a turnover on downs to make the score 28–0 in favor of the Crimson Tide by the fourth play of the second quarter. The Sooners broke the scoring streak with a touchdown on their next drive, a 32-yard pass from Kyler Murray to CeeDee Lamb. After an Alabama punt, the teams traded field goals extending into the third quarter. Alabama's first drive of the third quarter, which resulted in a punt, was the last drive until the very final possession of the game which did not result in a touchdown. The Sooners scored three times—receptions by Charleston Rambo and Lamb along with a Murray rush—while the Crimson Tide scored twice—catches by DeVonta Smith and Jerry Jeudy—to make the final score 45–34 in favor of Alabama.

=== Championship game ===
2019 College Football Playoff National Championship

Quarter	1	2	3	4	Total
No. 2 Clemson	14	17	13	0	44
No. 1 Alabama	13	3	0	0	16

at Levi's Stadium • Santa Clara, California

- Date: January 7, 2019
- Game time: 5:00 p.m. PST

Clemson and Alabama's meeting in the 2019 national championship marked the fourth consecutive playoff in which the teams had met, following the 2016 and 2017 national championships and the 2018 Sugar Bowl semifinal. Clemson jumped out to an early lead with an A. J. Terrell interception returned for a touchdown on Alabama's third play. The teams traded touchdowns, though an Alabama missed extra point kept a 1-point lead for the Tigers. Alabama took their first lead following a Joseph Bulovas field goal early in the second quarter but failed to score for the remainder of the game. Clemson scored seventeen points over their final three drives of the first half and scored two more in the second half while forcing three turnovers on downs by the Crimson Tide. The Tigers started their final drive at their own 1-yard line and drove to the Alabama 12-yard line before time expired, sealing a 44–16 Clemson victory.

== Aftermath ==
Clemson's national championship victory marked their second title in the last three seasons, and the third title in school history. Their win made them the first team since the establishment of the AP poll in 1936 to finish a season undefeated with fifteen wins; head coach Dabo Swinney won his third Paul "Bear" Bryant Award two days later. Alabama's 28-point loss in the championship game marked their largest margin of defeat since the 1998 Music City Bowl, where they lost by 31 points. It was double their largest-ever margin of defeat under head coach Nick Saban to that point.

Each semifinal game placed in the top six most-watched cable broadcasts of the 2018 calendar year, with Alabama–Oklahoma receiving 19.0 million viewers and Clemson–Notre Dame receiving 16.8 million. Both games' audiences peaked in the first half and declined as Alabama and Clemson each grew and maintained their respective leads. The Orange Bowl earned a Nielsen rating of 10.4, just beating out the Cotton Bowl's 10.3 rating. The national championship averaged 26.97 million viewers, more than either of Alabama and Clemson's prior CFP national championship meetings, putting it as the No. 7 most-watched cable broadcast of all time. In spite of this, the championship game's Nielsen rating of 14.6 was the lowest of any national championship game since 2012.

As is custom for national champions, Clemson was invited to the White House by U.S. president Donald Trump on January 14, 2019. Due to an ongoing federal government shutdown which caused some White House workers to be furloughed, Trump served the team a meal of fast food from McDonald's, Wendy's, Burger King, and Domino's Pizza, all of which he reported to have paid for himself, in the State Dining Room. He received some criticism for this, though some players commented positively.
