= Bill Hollinger =

American sports coach and college athletics administrator

Biographical details
- Born: April 27, 1921; Lisbon, Ohio, U.S.
- Died: April 9, 2011 (aged 89); Aurora, Ohio, U.S.
- Education: Hiram

Coaching career (HC unless noted)

Football
- 1956–1958: Hiram

Basketball
- 1950–1956: Ripon
- 1956–1988: Hiram

Head coaching record
- Overall: 9–15 (football); 332–493 (basketball)

William Harmon Hollinger (April 27, 1921 – April 9, 2011) was an American football, basketball, and track and field coach and college athletics administrator. He served as the head basketball coach at Ripon College in Ripon, Wisconsin from 1950 to 1956. He returned to his alma mater, Hiram College in Hiram, Ohio, in 1956 and served as the head football coach (1956–1958) and head basketball coach (1956–1988). Hollinger was inducted into the National Association of Collegiate Directors of Athletics Hall of Fame for his tenure as the athletic director at Hiram.

== Head coaching record ==
=== Football ===
Year	Team	Overall	Conference	Standing	Bowl/playoffs
Hiram Terriers (Ohio Athletic Conference) (1956–1958)
1956	Hiram	5–3	4–1	2nd	
1957	Hiram	3–5	2–4	9th	
1958	Hiram	1–7	1–6	14th	
Hiram:		9–15	7–11		
Total:		9–15			
