= Notre Dame Fighting Irish football rivalries =

The University of Notre Dame has rivalries in the sport of college football. Because the Notre Dame Fighting Irish are independent of a football conference, they play a national schedule, which annually includes historic rival Navy and five games with ACC teams.

== Current annual rivalries ==
=== Navy ===
Navy–Notre Dame football rivalry
- Navy Midshipmen Notre Dame Fighting Irish
- First meeting: October 15, 1927
- Latest meeting: October 31, 2026
- Next meeting: November 20, 2027
- Stadiums: Notre Dame Stadium (2021, 2023, 2025); M&T Bank Stadium (2022); Aviva Stadium (2023); MetLife Stadium (2024); Gillette Stadium (2026)
- Trophy: None (1927–2010); Rip Miller Trophy (2011–present)

Statistics
- Total meetings: 99
- All-time series: Notre Dame leads, 83–13–1 (.859)
- Trophy series: Notre Dame leads, 14–1 (.933)
- Largest victory: Notre Dame, 56–7 (1970)
- Longest win streak: Notre Dame, 43 (1964–2007)
- Current win streak: Notre Dame, 9 (2017–present)

The Navy–Notre Dame series was played annually between 1927 and 2019, which was the longest uninterrupted intersectional series in college football. The 2020 game was canceled due to the COVID-19 pandemic, though the series resumed in 2021.

Before Navy won a 46–44 triple-overtime thriller in 2007, Notre Dame had a 43-game winning streak that was the longest series win streak between two annual opponents in the history of Division I FBS football. Navy's previous win came in 1963, 35–14 with future Heisman Trophy winner and NFL QB Roger Staubach at the helm. Navy had come close to winning on numerous occasions before 2007. They subsequently won again in 2009, 2010, and 2016.

Despite the one-sided result the last few decades, most Notre Dame and Navy fans consider the series a sacred tradition for historical reasons. Both schools have strong football traditions going back to the beginnings of the sport. Notre Dame, like many colleges, faced severe financial difficulties during World War II. The US Navy made Notre Dame a training center and paid enough for usage of the facilities to keep the university afloat. Notre Dame has since extended an open invitation for Navy to play the Fighting Irish in football and considers the game annual repayment on a debt of honor. The series is marked by mutual respect, as evidenced by each team standing at attention during the playing of the other's alma mater after the game, a tradition that started in 2005. Navy's athletic director, on renewing the series through 2016, remarked "...it is of great interest to our collective national audience of Fighting Irish fans, Naval Academy alumni, and the Navy family at large." The series is scheduled to continue indefinitely; renewals are a mere formality.

Shortly before the start of the 2014 season, ESPN polled the head coaches in the so-called "Power Five" football conferences, plus Notre Dame's Brian Kelly, as to whether they would favor a schedule consisting only of "Power 5" opponents. Kelly was adamantly opposed to such a requirement if it meant taking Navy off the schedule, specifically calling a potential loss of the Navy game "a deal-breaker."

The series is a "home and home" series with the schools alternating the home team. Due to the relatively small size of the football stadium in Annapolis, the two teams have never met there. Instead, Navy usually hosts the game at larger facilities such as Baltimore's old Memorial Stadium or current M&T Bank Stadium, FedExField in Landover, Maryland, Veterans Stadium and later Lincoln Financial Field in Philadelphia, or at Giants Stadium in East Rutherford, New Jersey. During the 1960s, the Midshipmen hosted the game at John F. Kennedy Memorial Stadium in Philadelphia. In 1996 the game was played at Croke Park in Dublin, Ireland. The game returned to Dublin in 2012, where the Aviva Stadium hosted the event won by Notre Dame 50–10. The game was also occasionally played at old Cleveland Stadium. The game returned to Ireland in 2023, to make up for the 2020 game cancellation due to COVID-19's travel restrictions. This game was also played at Dublin's Aviva Stadium, won by Notre Dame 42–3.

In years when Navy hosts (even-numbered), it is one of few non-Southeastern Conference games aired on CBS. In years when Notre Dame hosts (odd-numbered), it is carried on NBC as are other Notre Dame home games. As of 2020, the rights to Navy football games have been picked up by ESPN, and it will air subsequent Navy–Notre Dame games.

== Historic rivalries ==
Notre Dame has traditionally played Division I FBS football independent from any conference affiliation. In its early years joining a conference, in particular the geographically contiguous Big Ten Conference, might have provided different scheduling opportunities than those that evolved historically. Conferences have periodically approached Notre Dame about joining, including the Big Ten in 1999. Notre Dame has elected to keep its independent status in football, even after joining the ACC for other sports.

Among Notre Dame's historic rivalries are:

=== Boston College ===
Holy War
- Boston College Eagles Notre Dame Fighting Irish
- First meeting: September 15, 1975; Notre Dame, 17–3
- Latest meeting: November 1, 2025; Notre Dame, 25–10
- Next meeting: November 14, 2026, in South Bend
- Trophy: Ireland Trophy; Frank Leahy Memorial Bowl

Statistics
- Total meetings: 28
- All-time series: Notre Dame leads, 18–9 (.667)
- Largest victory: Notre Dame, 54–7 (1992)
- Longest win streak: Notre Dame, 10 (2009–present)
- Current win streak: Notre Dame, 10 (2009–present)

Boston College is considered to be a rival with Notre Dame based on both institutions' connection to the Roman Catholic Church. The Fighting Irish and Boston College Eagles first met in 1975 in Dan Devine's debut as head coach. They met in the 1983 Liberty Bowl and during the regular season in 1987, then played each other annually from 1992 to 2004. The Fighting Irish and Eagles play for the Frank Leahy Memorial Bowl and Ireland Trophy.

The matchup has become relatively popular and gained several nicknames including the "Holy War", "The Bingo Bowl" and "The Celtic Bowl". In 1993, the Eagles ruined Notre Dame's undefeated season with a 41–39 victory on a 41-yard field goal by David Gordon as time ran out, overshadowing a furious comeback from a 38–17 fourth-quarter deficit by Notre Dame. Notre Dame leads the series 18–9, winning the last ten after the Eagles won the prior six meetings.

The series was scheduled to end after the 2010 season due in part to BC's move to the ACC; however, it was renewed in 2010. With Notre Dame's move to the ACC, they will continue to meet at least semi-regularly. The first meeting after Notre Dame's arrival in the ACC was held at Fenway Park in 2015 as part of Notre Dame's Shamrock Series, with the Irish winning 19–16; the next was in 2017 with Notre Dame winning 49–20. Notre Dame prevailed in 2020 by a score against BC of 45–31.

=== Michigan ===
Michigan–Notre Dame football rivalry
- Michigan Wolverines Notre Dame Fighting Irish
- First meeting: November 23, 1887; Michigan 8, Notre Dame 0
- Latest meeting: October 26, 2019; Michigan 45, Notre Dame 14
- Next meeting: September 3, 2033, Ann Arbor

Statistics
- Total meetings: 44
- All-time series: Michigan leads 25–17–1 (.593)
- Largest victory: Michigan, 38–0 (2007)
- Longest win streak: Michigan, 8 (1887–1908)
- Current win streak: Michigan, 1 (2019–present)

In another rivalry with a bordering state school, Notre Dame and Michigan first played in 1887 in Notre Dame's introduction to football. The Wolverines proceeded to win the first eight contests before losing in 1909, the final game in the series until 1942, when the Wolverines defeated the Fighting Irish.

On October 9, 1943, top-ranked Notre Dame defeated second-ranked Michigan in the first matchup of top teams since the institution of the AP Poll in 1936. The rivalry then froze at 11 games played until 1978, when it launched an evenly matched 15–15–1 run through 2014 (skipping only 1983–84, 1995–96, and 2000–01).

In the aftermath of Notre Dame's 5 game ACC schedule and Michigan's expanded Big 10 schedule, the series was put on a three-year hiatus after the 2014 game, a 31–0 Notre Dame victory. The series resumed at ND in 2018 with the Irish winning 24–17. The following year Michigan routed the Irish 45–14 in Ann Arbor.

The rivalry is heightened not only by location but also the two schools' competitive leadership atop the college football all-time winning percentage board, as well as its competition for the same type of student-athletes. Michigan leads the series 24–18–1.

=== Michigan State ===
Michigan State–Notre Dame football rivalry
- Michigan State Spartans Notre Dame Fighting Irish
- First meeting: November 25, 1897; Notre Dame 34, Michigan State 6
- Latest meeting: September 19, 2026; Notre Dame 27, Michigan State 10
- Next meeting: September 18, 2027, in East Lansing
- Trophy: Megaphone Trophy (1949–present)

Statistics
- Total meetings: 80
- All-time series: Notre Dame leads, 48–29–1 (.622)
- Trophy series: Notre Dame leads, 34–27–1 (.556)
- Largest victory: Notre Dame, 53–0 (1898)
- Longest win streak: Notre Dame, 6 (1897–1909, 1987–1994), Michigan State, 6 (1955–1963)
- Current win streak: Notre Dame, 2 (2017–present)

Notre Dame also has a rivalry with Michigan State University that began in 1897. From 1959 to 2013 the Fighting Irish played Michigan State every year without interruption, except for a two-year hiatus in 1995 and 1996. The next scheduled game is in 2027. The 1966 Notre Dame vs. Michigan State football game is regarded as one of the Games of the Century and is still talked about to this day because of its ending – a 10–10 tie. Since polls began in 1936, this game marked the 10th matchup that paired the No. 1 team against the No. 2 team, with Notre Dame having been involved in five of these ten games up to that point. Notre Dame leads the series 48–29–1.

Since 1949, the teams competed for the Megaphone Trophy, a trophy introduced by the Alumni Clubs of Notre Dame and Michigan State to be presented to the winner of the game. Notre Dame leads the Megaphone Trophy series 34–27–1.

=== Pittsburgh ===
Notre Dame–Pittsburgh football rivalry
- Notre Dame Fighting Irish Pittsburgh Panthers
- First meeting: October 30, 1909; Notre Dame, 6–0
- Latest meeting: November 15, 2025; Notre Dame, 37–15
- Next meeting: 2028

Statistics
- Total meetings: 74
- All-time series: Notre Dame leads, 51–21–1 (.701)
- Largest victory: Notre Dame, 58–0 (1944)
- Longest win streak: Notre Dame, 11 (1964–1974)
- Current win streak: Notre Dame, 5 (2015–present)

The Fighting Irish's longtime series with the Pittsburgh Panthers, Notre Dame's fifth most played football opponent, began in 1909, and there have been no more than two consecutive seasons without two teams meeting each other except between 1913 and 1929, 1938–42, and 1979–81. Since 1982, the Panthers have remained a relative fixture on the schedule. Notre Dame leads the series 51–21–1.

The longest game in Notre Dame history occurred between the two schools in 2008, when Pitt defeated ND in a record 4 overtimes by a field goal. The 2012 contest saw Notre Dame erase a 20–6 deficit in the fourth quarter and force overtime. The Irish won 29–26 in triple overtime after the Panthers narrowly missed a game-winning field goal in the second overtime.

In 2013 both schools joined the ACC (Pitt for all sports including football, and Notre Dame for non-football sports), which led to the schools playing at least once every three years.

Their ACC matchups began in 2013 in Pittsburgh with a 28–21 Panthers win. The most recent game was a 37–15 Irish win in 2025.

=== Purdue ===
Notre Dame–Purdue football rivalry
- Notre Dame Fighting Irish Purdue Boilermakers
- First meeting: November 14, 1896; Purdue 28, Notre Dame 22
- Latest meeting: September 20, 2025; Notre Dame 56, Purdue 30
- Trophy: Shillelagh Trophy (1957–present)

Statistics
- Total meetings: 90
- All-time series: Notre Dame leads, 60–26–2 (.693)
- Trophy series: Notre Dame leads, 41–19 (.683)
- Largest victory: Notre Dame, 66–7 (2024)
- Longest win streak: Notre Dame, 11 (1986–1996)
- Current win streak: Notre Dame, 9 (2008–present)

This in-state rivalry began in 1896. From 1946 to 2014, the Fighting Irish played Purdue Boilermakers every year without interruption. The series is scheduled to resume on a non-annual basis in 2021 with Notre Dame leading the series 60–26–2. The two teams play for the Shillelagh Trophy, which was introduced in 1957.

The series has been marked by a number of key upsets. Purdue ended Notre Dame's 39-game unbeaten streak in 1950 and posted upsets in 1954, 1967 and 1974. They also hold the record for the most points scored in one game by an opponent in Notre Dame Stadium with 51 in 1960. In addition, Purdue holds records for the most points scored against Notre Dame in the first (24 in 1974) and second quarters (31 in 1960).

On September 28, 1968, No. 1 Purdue defeated No. 2 Notre Dame 37–22 behind the effort of Leroy Keyes, a two-way player for the Boilermakers. It was the eleventh 1 vs 2 game (and the sixth involving Notre Dame).

=== Stanford ===
Notre Dame–Stanford football rivalry
- Notre Dame Fighting Irish Stanford Cardinal
- First meeting: January 1, 1925; Notre Dame 27, Stanford 10
- Latest meeting: October 10, 2026; Notre Dame 49, Stanford 20
- Next meeting: November 27, 2027
- Trophy: None (1925–1988); Legends Trophy (1989–present)

Statistics
- Total meetings: 40
- All-time series: Notre Dame leads, 25–14 (.641)
- Trophy series: Notre Dame leads, 22–13 (.629)
- Largest victory: Notre Dame, 58–7 (2026)
- Longest win streak: Notre Dame, 7 (2002–2008)
- Current win streak: Notre Dame, 4 (2023–present)

The Fighting Irish have a rivalry with the Stanford Cardinal for the Legends Trophy, a combination of Fighting Irish crystal with California redwood. The two teams first met in the 1925 Rose Bowl, then played each other in 1942 and again in 1963–64.

The modern series began in 1988 when Notre Dame sought out a school to play out west over Thanksgiving weekend during the years that USC plays in Indiana.

The series has been played annually except in 1995–96 and 2020. The rivalry has become competitive in some years, particularly during the tenures of Stanford coaches Jim Harbaugh and David Shaw. Notre Dame and Stanford are regularly ranked in the U.S. News & World Report top 20 best colleges in the United States, and both share a mission to develop student athletes that can excel in the classroom and on the football field. As a result, both schools often compete for similar types of athletes in recruiting.

Notre Dame leads the series 25–14. When the game is played in Palo Alto, it is usually the last game on Stanford's schedule (as has been the case since 1999), one week after the Cardinal plays archrival Cal in The Big Game. All but two of the games in Indiana have been played in October; the only exceptions, in 2010 and 2018, were on the last Saturday of September.

The 2020 game, scheduled to be played at Notre Dame on Saturday October 10, was canceled because of the COVID-19 pandemic, along with all other non-conference games involving Pac-12 schools. Notre Dame's rivalry games with USC and Navy were also canceled.

=== USC ===
Notre Dame–USC football rivalry
- Notre Dame Fighting Irish USC Trojans
- First meeting: December 4, 1926; Los Angeles Memorial Coliseum; Notre Dame 13, USC 12
- Latest meeting: October 18, 2025; Notre Dame Stadium; Notre Dame 34, USC 24
- Next meeting: August 31, 2030; Los Angeles Memorial Coliseum
- Trophy: None (1926–1951); Jeweled Shillelagh (1952–present)

Statistics
- Total meetings: 96
- All-time series: Notre Dame leads, 51–37–5 (Note: On the field, including vacated wins, Notre Dame leads 52–38–5.) (.571)
- Trophy series: Notre Dame leads, 36–30–3 (.537)
- Largest victory: Notre Dame, 51–0 (1966)
- Longest win streak: Notre Dame, 11 (1983–1993)
- Longest unbeaten streak: Notre Dame, 13 (1983–1995)
- Current win streak: Notre Dame, 3 (2023–present)

Notre Dame's main rival is the University of Southern California. The Notre Dame–USC football rivalry has been played annually since 1926, except from 1943 to 1945 and 2020, and is regarded as the greatest intersectional series in college football. The winner of the annual rivalry game is awarded the coveted Jeweled Shillelagh, a war club adorned with emerald-emblazoned clovers signifying Fighting Irish victories and ruby-emblazoned Trojan warrior heads for Trojan wins. When the original shillelagh ran out of space for the Trojan heads and shamrocks after the 1989 game, it was retired and is permanently displayed at Notre Dame. A new shillelagh was introduced for the 1997 season. Through the 2025 season, Notre Dame leads the series 51–37–5.

The origin of the series is often recounted as a "conversation between wives" of Notre Dame head coach Knute Rockne and USC athletic director Gywnn Wilson. In fact, many sports writers often cite this popular story as the main reason the two schools decided to play one another. As the story goes, the series began with USC looking for a national rival. USC dispatched Wilson and his wife to Lincoln, Nebraska, where Notre Dame was playing Nebraska on Thanksgiving Day. On that day (Nebraska 17, Notre Dame 0) Knute Rockne resisted the idea of a home-and-home series with USC because of the travel involved, but Mrs. Wilson was able to persuade Mrs. Rockne that a trip every two years to sunny Southern California was better than one to snowy, hostile Nebraska. Mrs. Rockne spoke to her husband and on December 4, 1926, USC became an annual fixture on Notre Dame's schedule.

However, several college football historians, including Murray Sperber, have uncovered evidence that somewhat contradicts this story. Of the most contradictory parts is the idea that Rockne was resistant to playing out west. Sperber documents that USC offered to play Notre Dame back in 1925 at the Rose Bowl. Notre Dame ultimately played Stanford that year because they were the Pacific Coast Conference champions. However, due to the large alumni support for an annual season ending game in Los Angeles and the still existing interest for a home-and-home series, Notre Dame and USC started playing the series the following year in 1926. The series creation was also likely aided by USC coach Howard Jones, whom Rockne recommended USC hire due to their long friendship.

Since 1961, the game has alternated between Notre Dame Stadium in Indiana in mid-October and the Los Angeles Memorial Coliseum, which serves as USC's home field, in late November. Originally the game was played in both locations in late November, but because of poor weather during that time of the year in northern Indiana, USC insisted on having the game moved to October in 1961.

The 2020 game, scheduled to be played in Los Angeles on Saturday November 28, was canceled because of the COVID-19 pandemic, along with all other non-conference games involving Pac-12 schools. Notre Dame's rivalry games with Navy and Stanford were also canceled.

== Significant series ==
The following is a list of other significant series in alphabetical order and a synopsis of each series history.

=== Army ===
Army–Notre Dame football rivalry
- Army Black Knights Notre Dame Fighting Irish
- First meeting: November 1, 1913; Notre Dame, 35–13
- Latest meeting: November 23, 2024; Notre Dame, 49–14

Statistics
- Total meetings: 52
- All-time series: Notre Dame leads, 40–8–4 (.808)
- Largest victory: Army, 59–0 (1944); Notre Dame, 62–3 (1973)
- Longest win streak: Notre Dame, 15 (1965–present)
- Current win streak: Notre Dame, 15 (1965–present)

While Notre Dame and Army have not been consistent rivals in recent years, their contests were significant in the first half of the 20th century. It was Army that helped Notre Dame gain a national following by scheduling them during the Rockne years while Notre Dame was unable to schedule games with Big Ten teams. The first Army–Notre Dame contest in 1913 is regarded by some pundits as one of the era's most important confrontations. That game has also been noted for Notre Dame's use of the forward pass, which was not a common tactic at the time.

During the 1940s, the rivalry with the U.S. Military Academy Cadets (now Black Knights) reached its zenith. This was because both teams were extremely successful and met several times in key games (including one of the Games of the Century, a scoreless tie in the 1946 Army vs. Notre Dame football game). In 1944, the Cadets administered the worst defeat in Notre Dame football history, crushing the Fighting Irish 59–0. The following year, it was more of the same, a 48–0 victory. The 1947 game was played on the Notre Dame campus for the first time and the Fighting Irish prevailed, 27–7. The annual game then went on hiatus for 10 years, after occurring every year since 1919.

Since then, there have been infrequent meetings over the past several decades, with Army's last win coming in 1958. Like Navy, due to the small capacity of Army's Michie Stadium, the Black Knights play their home games at a neutral site, which for a number of years was Yankee Stadium and before that the Polo Grounds. In 1957, the game was played in Philadelphia's Municipal (later John F. Kennedy Memorial) Stadium while in 1965, the teams met at Shea Stadium in New York. The 1973 contest was played at West Point with the Fighting Irish prevailing, 62–3. In more recent times, games in which Army was the host have been played at Giants Stadium in East Rutherford, New Jersey.

Notre Dame leads the series 40–8–4, most recently defeating Army 49–14 at Yankee Stadium in Bronx, NY in 2024.

=== Clemson ===
Clemson–Notre Dame football rivalry
- Clemson Tigers Notre Dame Fighting Irish
- First meeting: November 12, 1977; Notre Dame, 21–17
- Latest meeting: November 4, 2023; Clemson, 31–23
- Next meeting: November 13, 2027 (Clemson, SC)
- Stadiums: Notre Dame Stadium, Notre Dame, IN; Memorial Stadium, Clemson, SC

Statistics
- Total meetings: 8
- All-time series: Clemson leads, 5–3 (.625)
- Largest victory: Clemson, 30–3 (2018)
- Longest win streak: Clemson, 3 (1979–2018)
- Current win streak: Clemson, 1 (2023–present)

The Fighting Irish and Tigers first met in 1977 in Clemson, SC, with the Fighting Irish winning 21–17. They met again in 1979 in South Bend, IN, the Tigers winning 16–10. The teams would not meet again until 2015, a ranked matchup of #6 Fighting Irish and #11 Tigers. The Tigers led 21–3 in the third quarter, but the Fighting Irish stormed back with three fourth quarter touchdowns but failed to convert the 2-point conversion with :06 left in the game, losing 24–22.

The next meeting was the 2018 Cotton Bowl Classic, a CFP Semifinal. Both teams came into the game undefeated; #2 Tigers were 13–0 and the #3 Fighting Irish were 12–0. The Tigers won 30–3 and went on to win the National Championship.

In 2020, the Power Five conferences enforced restrictions on non-conference games in light of the COVID-19 pandemic, and the Fighting Irish played a full Atlantic Coast Conference (ACC) schedule which included a matchup with the Tigers. Both teams came into the game undefeated and ranked in the top 5; Tigers were #1 and Fighting Irish #4. The Fighting Irish prevailed in double overtime, 47–40. The Fighting Irish went on to an undefeated ACC season, clinching a berth into the 2020 ACC Championship Game, a matchup against, the #3 Tigers. The Tigers defeated #2 Fighting Irish 34–10. Both teams would clinch spots in the 2020–21 College Football Playoff, but both lost in the semifinals.

The teams split the next two meetings, 2022 and 2023, the home team winning each time. The next scheduled meeting is November 13, 2027. On May 6, 2025, Clemson and Notre Dame announced that they have scheduled a 12-game football series spanning from 2027 to 2038. The annual game against Clemson will not count towards Notre Dame's five annual ACC contests in seasons when the games were already contracted (2027, 2028, 2031, 2034, and 2037).

=== Florida State ===
Florida State–Notre Dame football rivalry
- Florida State Seminoles Notre Dame Fighting Irish
- First meeting: October 10, 1981; Florida State, 19–13
- Latest meeting: November 9, 2024; Notre Dame, 52–3
- Next meeting: 2029

Statistics
- Total meetings: 12
- All-time series: Tied, 6–6 (.500)
- Largest victory: Notre Dame, 52–3 (2024)
- Longest win streak: Notre Dame, 4 (2018–present)
- Current win streak: Notre Dame, 4 (2018–present)

Notre Dame and Florida State have met twelve times, first when both were independents and now as part of Notre Dame's commitment to scheduling ACC schools.

This series began in Indiana in 1981. Florida State won 19–13. Notre Dame won the second contest, however, in 1993, in South Bend, by a score of 31–24. The contest was referred to by some as "The Game of the Century." Florida State was at the time ranked No. 1 and Notre Dame was ranked No. 2.

Although Notre Dame beat FSU again in Tallahassee in 2002 by a score of 34–24, Florida State then won five of the next six meetings (1994, 1995, 2003, 2011, 2014), including two bowl victories (the January 1996 Orange Bowl and the 2011 Champs Sports Bowl).

Notre Dame rebounded with four straight wins with three convincing victories in Indiana (2018, 2020, 2024) and an overtime thriller in Tallahassee (2021).

The two teams are next scheduled to meet during the regular season in 2029. The series is tied 6–6.

=== Georgia Tech ===
Georgia Tech–Notre Dame football rivalry
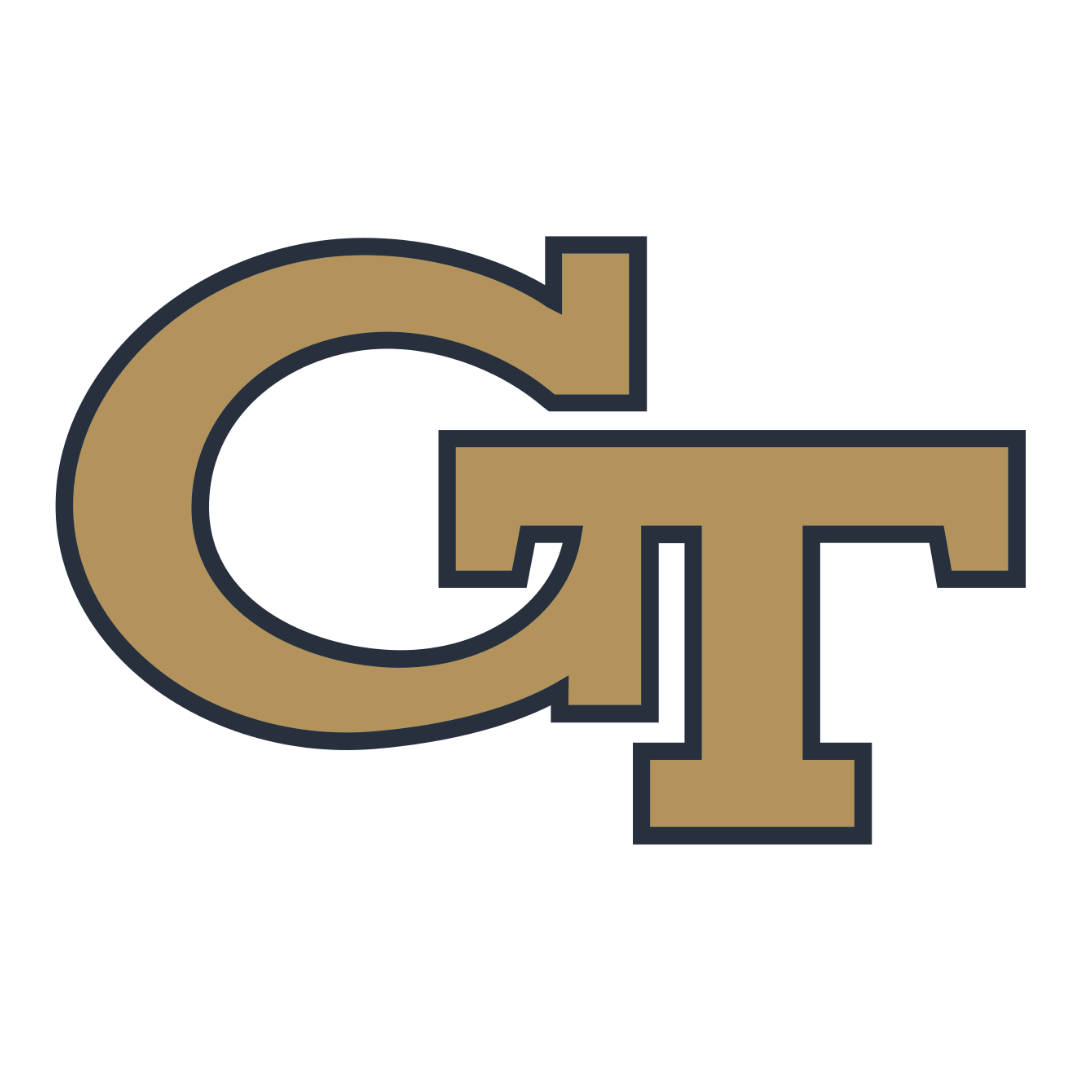
- Georgia Tech Yellow Jackets Notre Dame Fighting Irish
- First meeting: October 28, 1922; Notre Dame, 13–3
- Latest meeting: October 19, 2024; Notre Dame, 31–13
- Next meeting: 2029

Statistics
- Total meetings: 38
- All-time series: Notre Dame leads, 31–6–1 (.829)
- Largest victory: Notre Dame, 69–14 (1977) and 55–0 (2021)
- Longest win streak: Notre Dame, 6 (1922–27) and (1967–75)
- Current win streak: Notre Dame, 4 (2015–present)

This series began in 1922. The Yellow Jackets were a longtime rival of the Fighting Irish and the two teams met periodically on an annual basis over the years, particularly from 1963 to 1981 when both schools were independents following Tech's departure from the Southeastern Conference. Both universities are known for their high academic standards, which helped contribute to the development of this rivalry.

The 1975 Georgia Tech-Notre Dame game marked the sole appearance in an Irish uniform for Rudy Ruettiger, the subject of the film Rudy. When Georgia Tech joined the Atlantic Coast Conference beginning in 1982, they were forced to end the series after 1981 because of scheduling difficulties and their desire to maintain their rivalries against former Southeastern Conference (SEC) foes Georgia and Auburn.

Consequently, the two teams have met very infrequently since then. Georgia Tech was the opponent in the inaugural game in the newly expanded Notre Dame Stadium in 1997, then a year later they met again in the Gator Bowl. The Fighting Irish and Yellow Jackets met in the 2006 and 2007 season openers and split both games. Notre Dame leads the series 31–6–1.

The rivalry resumed in 2015 with a 30–22 Irish win in Indiana and will continue on a semi-regular basis thereafter due to Notre Dame's current commitment to scheduling several ACC opponents each season.

=== Indiana ===
Indiana–Notre Dame football rivalry
- Indiana Hoosiers Notre Dame Fighting Irish
- First meeting: November 5, 1898; Indiana, 11–5
- Latest meeting: December 20, 2024; Notre Dame, 27–17

Statistics
- Total meetings: 30
- Most wins: Notre Dame leads 24–5–1 (.817)
- Largest victory: Notre Dame, 49–6 (1949)
- Longest win streak: Notre Dame, 14 (1908–1949)
- Current win streak: Notre Dame, 7 (1951–present)

Although not as significant as the soccer rivalry between the two schools, the Hoosiers still serve as in-state competition for Notre Dame in football. The two teams first met in 1898, and continued to consistently play each other up until 1958. However, since then, the two teams have only met twice, once in 1991, and again in 2024, with the latter being a first round matchup in the 2024 College Football Playoff.

The rivalry has historically been dominated by Notre Dame, who hold a 24–5–1 record in the series. The Fighting Irish have lost only one game to the Hoosiers since 1908. However, that one loss came in the 1950 season, and was a shocking result, considering that the Irish had won three of the last four national championships at the time, as well as four of the last seven Heisman Trophy winners. In 1907, the game between the two ended in a 0–0 tie, the only tie of the series. Notre Dame has not lost a game at home to the Hoosiers since their first meeting in 1898.

The two teams met for the first time in 33 years in the first round of the 2024 College Football Playoff. The game was the first ever home playoff game in college football history. It was the first game of the expanded 12-team College Football Playoff, and only the fourth time that Notre Dame has hosted a game in December. It also was the first time since 1990 that Notre Dame had played on a Friday, and the first time since 1990 that a Notre Dame home game was not broadcast by NBC. Going into the game, Notre Dame was ranked fifth in the CFB rankings, and Indiana was ranked eighth. The first touchdown of the game came on a 98-yard rush from Jeremiyah Love, which set a record as the longest rush in College Football Playoff history. From then on out, it was smooth sailing for the Irish, who continued their success against the Hoosiers. Indiana would score two touchdowns in the final two minutes to provide a slight scare and tighten the score, but the Irish would handily beat them and move on the play the Georgia Bulldogs in the CFB Quarterfinals. From there, they would go all the way to the National Championship Game, where they lost to Ohio State.

The two teams were slated to play a home-home series in 2030 and 2031, with the first game at Notre Dame and the second in Bloomington. However, the series was canceled in 2026.

=== Miami (FL) ===
Miami–Notre Dame football rivalry
- Miami Hurricanes Notre Dame Fighting Irish
- First meeting: October 7, 1955; Notre Dame, 14–0
- Latest meeting: November 7, 2026; Notre Dame, 31–24
- Next meeting: 2028

Statistics
- Total meetings: 29
- All-time series: Notre Dame leads 18–9–1 (.661) (Note: Notre Dame vacated 2012 win.)
- Largest victory: Miami, 58–7 (1985); Notre Dame, 44–0 (1973)
- Longest win streak: Notre Dame, 11 (1967–1980)
- Current win streak: Notre Dame, 1 (2026–present)

Notre Dame and the Miami Hurricanes first met during the 1955 college football season. They met three times during the 1960s (1960, 1965 and 1967), and proceeded to play each other annually from 1971 to 1990 (except in 1986). Notre Dame consistently dominated the series in the 1970s, but in the 1980s, Miami began to dominate as the once docile rivalry intensified significantly. Both teams were national contenders in the later part of the decade, and both teams cost each other at least one national championship. Hostilities were fueled when the Hurricanes routed the Fighting Irish in the 1985 season finale 58–7, with Miami widely accused of running up the score in the second half. The rivalry gained national attention and both teams played their most famous games from 1988 to 1990. The landmark game known as Catholics vs. Convicts was won by the Fighting Irish 31–30, on October 15, 1988. The following year, Miami ended Notre Dame's record 23-game winning streak, 27–10. The rivalry ended after the Fighting Irish dashed No. 2 Miami's hopes for a repeat national championship with a 29–20 victory in South Bend in 1990. Miami has the distinction of being the only team to shut out Notre Dame during the Ara Parseghian (0–0 in 1965), Gerry Faust (20–0 in 1983) and Lou Holtz (24–0 in 1987) eras.

The Fighting Irish and Hurricanes met again 20 years later in the 2010 Sun Bowl in El Paso, Texas, where Notre Dame defeated Miami 33–17. In 2012, the teams met again and Fighting Irish defeated the Hurricanes 41–3 at Soldier Field during its annual Shamrock Series, but that victory was later vacated for ND's use of ineligible players. Notre Dame leads the series 18–9–1. The teams met most recently in 2026, during a top-five AP Poll matchup when, No. 4 Notre Dame defeated No. 1 Miami, 31–24. Future games are scheduled between the two teams at yet-to-be-determined dates in the 2028, 2031, 2032, 2034, and 2037 seasons.

=== Nebraska ===
Nebraska–Notre Dame football rivalry
- Nebraska Cornhuskers Notre Dame Fighting Irish
- First meeting: October 23, 1915; Nebraska, 20–19
- Latest meeting: September 8, 2001; Nebraska, 27–10
- Next meeting: October 30, 2032

Statistics
- Total meetings: 16
- All-time series: Nebraska leads, 8–7–1 (.531)
- Largest victory: Nebraska, 40–6 (1973)
- Longest win streak: Nebraska, 3 (1973–present); Notre Dame, 3 (1919–21)
- Current win streak: Nebraska, 3 (1973–present)

The Fighting Irish and Nebraska Cornhuskers first met in 1915 and played each other annually through 1925, when Notre Dame chose to pursue a rivalry with USC in lieu of their rivalry with Nebraska.

During the years of Notre Dame's famed Four Horsemen backfield from 1922 to 1924, the Fighting Irish compiled a record of 27–2–1, with their only losses coming to Nebraska in Lincoln (1922 and 1923).

The Fighting Irish won in 1924 in Indiana and Nebraska won in 1925 in Lincoln, evening the series at 5–5–1 (the 0–0 tie occurring in 1918). The Huskers were replaced on Notre Dame's schedule with USC. They met twice during the Frank Leahy era in 1947 and 1948 with the Fighting Irish winning 31–0 and 44–13, respectively.

The teams squared off in the 1973 Orange Bowl, a game in which the Huskers handed the Fighting Irish their worst defeat under Ara Parseghian, 40–6. More recently, there was a home-and-home series in 2000–01 (with the Huskers winning 27–24 and 27–10, respectively). The 2000 game was a memorable one, as No. 1 Nebraska escaped defeat in overtime on a touchdown run by Eric Crouch. Nebraska leads the series 8–7–1.

On September 16, 2026, both teams announced a two-game series, 2032 in Lincoln and 2033 in Notre Dame.

=== Northwestern ===
Northwestern–Notre Dame football rivalry
- Northwestern Wildcats Notre Dame Fighting Irish
- First meeting: November 14, 1889; Notre Dame 9, Northwestern 0
- Latest meeting: November 3, 2018; Notre Dame 31, Northwestern 21

Statistics
- Total meetings: 49
- All-time series: Notre Dame leads, 38–9–2 (.796)
- Largest victory: Notre Dame, 48–0 (1976)
- Longest win streak: Notre Dame, 14 (1965–1994)
- Current win streak: Notre Dame, 1 (2018)

The series began in 1889, one of the oldest in Fighting Irish football annals. It has been suggested that the nickname, "Fighting Irish," originated during that first meeting when Northwestern fans chanted, "Kill those Irish! Kill those fighting Irish!" at halftime. Northwestern and Notre Dame had a yearly contest from 1929 to 1948, with the winner taking home a shillelagh, much like the winner of the Notre Dame–USC contest now receives. The two schools are located in bordering states in the mid-western United States.

The Northwestern-Notre Dame shillelagh was largely forgotten by the early 1960s. Northwestern ended the series after 1948, as did several other schools who were getting tired of being beaten year in and year out by Notre Dame, and the two schools would not meet again until 1959. By then, Ara Parseghian was coaching the Wildcats, who notched four consecutive victories over Notre Dame between 1959 and 1962.

After Parseghian came to Notre Dame, he posted a 9–0 docket against his old team. In fact, the Fighting Irish did not lose to Northwestern again until September 1995, which was the beginning of a Rose Bowl season for the Wildcats and the two teams' last meeting for nearly 20 years.

The series was renewed in 2014 when the Wildcats traveled to Indiana for the first time since 1995, defeating the Irish 43–40 in overtime. The Irish repaid the visit in 2018 when they traveled to Evanston and defeated Wildcats 31–21. Notre Dame leads the series 38–9–2. As of 2026, there are no future meetings scheduled between the teams.

=== Penn State ===
Notre Dame–Penn State football rivalry
- Notre Dame Fighting Irish Penn State Nittany Lions
- First meeting: November 8, 1913; Notre Dame, 14–7
- Latest meeting: January 9, 2025; Notre Dame, 27–24

Statistics
- Total meetings: 20
- All-time series: Notre Dame leads, 10–9–1 (.525)
- Largest victory: Notre Dame, 44–7 (1984)
- Longest win streak: Notre Dame, 3 (1926–76); Penn State, 3 (1981–83) ; (1985–87)
- Current win streak: Notre Dame, 1 (2025–present)

Notre Dame and Penn State first met in 1913. After subsequent games in 1925, 1926 and 1928, the two schools would not meet again until the 1976 Gator Bowl, by which time an annual home-and-home series beginning in 1981 had been agreed upon. The Fighting Irish held a 4–0–1 edge going into 1981, but Penn State won 6 of the next 7.

The coaches were one source of the rivalry. Lou Holtz and Joe Paterno were both long serving and successful coaches at their respective schools. Their friendly rivalry helped expand the Notre Dame–Penn State rivalry to new dimensions.

The series ended after the 1992 season, coinciding with formerly independent Penn State's affiliation with the Big Ten. It had been scheduled to continue through 1994 and Notre Dame approached Penn State about extending it even further, but Penn State's admittance to the Big Ten in 1990 made it more difficult to fit the games on the schedule.

However, the Fighting Irish and Nittany Lions recent successes and other factors led to the renewal of the rivalry in 2006–07, in which the teams split both games.

The series was renewed on January 9, 2025, as part of the 2024–25 College Football Playoff, where the two met in the semifinal game. Notre Dame defeated Penn State 27–24 on a game-winning field goal with 10 seconds left to advance to the National Championship game. Notre Dame leads the series 10–9–1.
