= Christine Plonsky =

Chris Plonsky
Current position
- Title: Executive Senior Associate Athletics Director, Chief of Staff and Senior Woman Administrator
- Team: Texas

Biographical details
- Born: Jan. 15; Pittsburgh, Pennsylvania, U.S.
- Education: Kent State University, 1979

Christine Plonsky is an American college athletics administrator. Plonsky has been at the University of Texas at Austin athletics department since 1993, where she currently serves as executive senior associate athletics director/chief of staff and senior woman administrator (SWA) for SEC and NCAA governance.

== Early life and education ==
Plonsky was born in Pittsburgh, and raised in Greensburg, Pennsylvania, and northeast Ohio. She earned a journalism degree from Kent State University in 1979, where she lettered three years as a basketball student-athlete, worked as an undergraduate assistant in athletics media relations, and served as editor of The Daily Kent Stater.

== Career ==
=== Early career ===
Plonsky began working in college athletics in 1976. She held positions in communications and media relations at Iowa State University (1979–1981), the University of Texas (1982–1986), and the Big East Conference (1986–1990). She then served as associate commissioner for the Big East from 1990 to 1993.

=== University of Texas ===
Plonsky joined the University of Texas athletics department in two stints: 1981–1986 and since October 1993.

From 1993 to 2017, she oversaw revenue areas for Texas men's and women's athletics, including multimedia rights, sponsorships, marketing, television, and trademark licensing. She served as women's athletics director from April 2001 to December 2017.

In her current role since September 2018, Plonsky supervises leaders in student services (academics, learning, 4EVER TEXAS career readiness/leadership development/personal branding), sports medicine (athletic training, strength/performance nutrition, behavioral health, applied sport science), and compliance/risk management.

In Austin, she serves on numerous University campus committees and volunteers on the University Federal Credit Union supervisory committee.

== National leadership ==
Plonsky served 28 years (1997–2024) on the USA Basketball board of directors and is an emeritus board member of the National Football Foundation/College Football Hall of Fame. She currently chairs the Women's Basketball Hall of Fame Board of Trustees and serves on its Board of Governors.

She is a former president of the National Association of Collegiate Directors of Athletics (NACDA), National Association of Collegiate Marketing Administrators (NACMA), and Women Leaders in Sports (formerly NACWAA). Plonsky chaired the NCAA Division I Management Council in 2003 and has served on NCAA committees for academic performance, women’s basketball competition, and commercialization activities. She is a past member of the NACDA board and executive committee, and a past board member of the FBS Athletic Directors Association (formerly LEAD1/Division I AD Association). She previously served on the USOPC Collegiate Advisory Council.

== Awards and honors ==
- Texas Sports Hall of Fame Inductee (2025)
- Greater Austin Sports Foundation Hall of Honor Inductee (2024)
- Honorary Referee, 2024 Clyde Littlefield Texas Relays presented by Truist (2024)
- Women's Basketball Coaches Association (WBCA) Administrator of the Year (2023)
- Naismith Outstanding Contributor to Women's Basketball (2023)
- College Sports Information Directors of America (CoSIDA) Hall of Fame (2021)
- First Tee of Greater Austin Nine Core Values Respect Award (2020)
- Women Leaders in Sports Podcast (2018)
- NACDA AD Spotlight: Chris Plonsky (2016)
- Taylor Award, Kent State journalism alumnus of the year (2015)
- National Association of Athletic Compliance Coordinators Organizational Leadership Award (2010)
- Texas Exes Top Hand Award (2009)
- NACWAA Division I-A Administrator of the Year (2004)
- NACMA Hall of Fame (2003)
