= Jim Jones (athletic director) =

American college athletics administrator (1936–2020)

Biographical details
- Born: June 23, 1936; Akron, Ohio, U.S.
- Died: April 22, 2020 (aged 83); Bonita Springs, Florida, U.S.
- Education: Kent State University; Ball State University

Administrative career (AD unless noted)
- 1970–1977: Ohio State (assistant AD)
- 1977–1987: Ohio State (associate AD)
- 1987–1994: Ohio State

James Jones (June 23, 1936 – April 22, 2020) was an American college athletics administrator who was athletic director at Ohio State University from 1987 to 1994.

== Early life ==
Jones was born in Akron, Ohio, on June 23, 1936, to Sterling and Viola (Hager) Jones. He grew up in Cuyahoga Falls, Ohio and graduated from Cuyahoga Falls High School. He received his Bachelor of Science from Kent State University in 1958, then worked as a high school teacher and coach in northeastern Ohio. He earned his master's degree from Ball State University in 1964.

== Ohio State ==
In 1965, Jones joined the faculty at Ohio State as a physical education instructor. He moved to the athletic department in 1967 as an academic advisor to the football team. He was promoted to assistant athletic director in 1970 and associate athletic director in 1977. He oversaw many of the department's day-to-day operations, including the eligibility, compliance, team travel, and grants-in-aid programs as well as the sports information, academic counselling, and business offices. He was considered for the athletic director's job in 1984, but was passed over in favor of Rick Bay.

In 1987, Bay resigned in protest of president Edward H. Jennings's decision to fire head football coach Earle Bruce and Jones was promoted to AD. On December 30, 1987, Jones announced John Cooper as Bruce's successor. Cooper compiled a 111–43–4 record in thirteen seasons with the Buckeyes, but went 2-10-1 against archrival Michigan and 3-8 and bowl games.

In 1989, Jones announced the hiring of the school's first black head basketball coach when assistant coach Randy Ayers was promoted following Gary Williams' departure to his alma mater, Maryland. Ayers was reportedly chosen over Arkansas head coach Nolan Richardson and Tennessee head coach Don DeVoe. Ayers led the Buckeyes to the NCAA Division I men's basketball tournament in his each of his first three seasons, but went 54–85 over the next five seasons and was fired in 1997.

In May 1993, the National Collegiate Athletic Association found 17 violations by the Ohio State men's basketball program. On February 18, 1994, OSU president E. Gordon Gee announced that the investigation had expanded to the entire Buckeye athletic program and the school had self-reported additional violations to the NCAA. That same day, Jones announced his retirement effective June 30. The Columbus Dispatch reported that Jones' departure was made a show of good faith to the NCAA, but Jones and Gee denied that his early retirement was related to the investigation.

== Later life ==
In 2013, Jones received the National Association of Collegiate Directors of Athletics' Corbett Award, an annual award presented to the collegiate administrator who "has most typified Corbett's devotion to intercollegiate athletics and worked unceasingly for its betterment". He spent his later years residing in Dublin, Ohio and Bonita Springs, Florida. Jones died on April 22, 2020 in Bonita Springs.
