= Bobo Field =

Baseball venue in Lewiston, New York, US

- Interactive map of Bobo Field
- Full name: John P. Bobo Field
- Location: 5795 Lewiston Rd; Lewiston, NY, 14305
- Coordinates: 43.137290°N 79.030185°W
- Owner: Niagara University
- Operator: Niagara University
- Surface: Synthetic turf
- Scoreboard: Electronic
- Field size: Left Field: 327 feet (100 m); Center Field: 394 feet (120 m); Right Field: 315 feet (96 m)

Construction
- Renovated: 2017
- General contractors: Anastasi Trucking & Paving Co.

Tenant
- Niagara Purple Eagles baseball (NCAA DI MAAC) (19??–present)

John P. Bobo Field is a baseball venue in Lewiston, New York, United States. It is home to the Niagara Purple Eagles baseball team of the NCAA Division I Metro Atlantic Athletic Conference (MAAC). The field's namesake is John P. Bobo, a Niagara Falls native and 1965 alumni.

== History ==
In 2017, the field underwent renovations included a full synthetic turf field, expanded seating areas, a new scoreboard and dugouts, a press box and a new backstop with netting.

== Features ==
The field's features include a synthetic turf playing surface, a press box, an electronic scoreboard, dugouts, a brick backstop, restrooms, and concessions.

== See also ==
- List of NCAA Division I baseball venues
