= Niagara Purple Eagles baseball =

Niagara Purple Eagles
- 2026 Niagara Purple Eagles baseball team
- Founded: 1949
- University: Niagara University
- Head coach: Matt Spatafora (2nd season)
- Conference: MAAC
- Location: Lewiston, New York
- Home stadium: John P. Bobo Field
- Nickname: Purple Eagles
- Colors: Purple and white

NCAA tournament appearances
- 2024

Conference tournament champions
- 2024

Conference regular season champions
- 1997, 2024

The Niagara Purple Eagles baseball team is a varsity intercollegiate athletic team of Niagara University in Lewiston, New York, United States. The team is a member of the Metro Atlantic Athletic Conference, which is part of the National Collegiate Athletic Association's Division I. The team plays its home games at John P. Bobo Field in Lewiston, New York. The Purple Eagles are coached by Matt Spatafora.

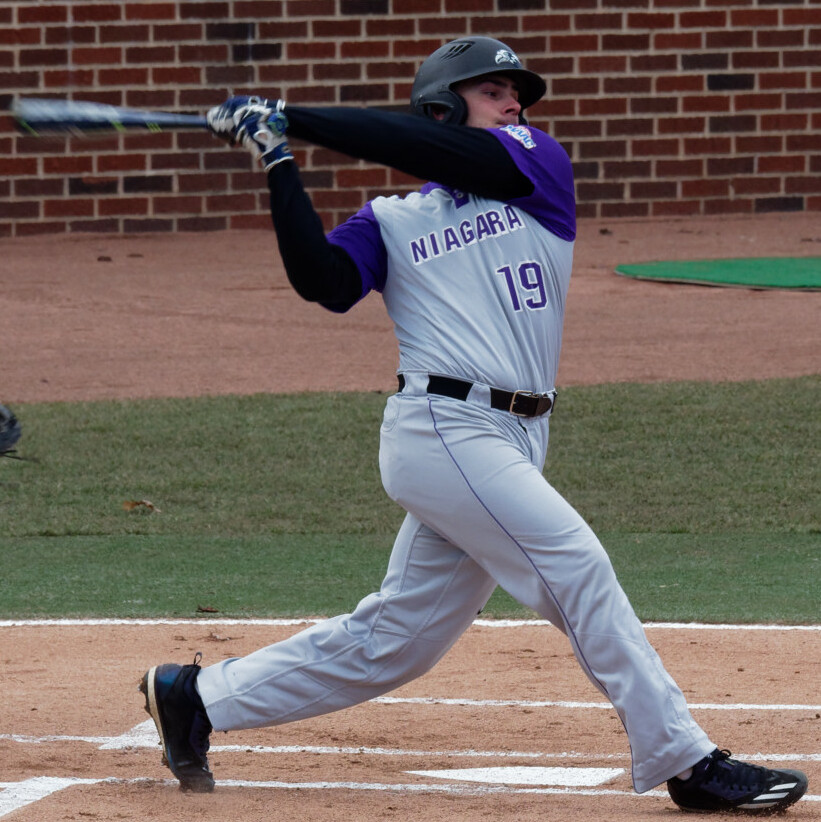
Benny Serrano during a game in 2018

== Niagara in the NCAA Tournament ==
Year	Record	Pct	Notes
2024	0–2	.000	Stillwater Regional
TOTALS	0–2	.000	

== Year-by-year results ==
Below is a table of the program's year-by-year results.

Record table
Season	Coach	Overall	Conference	Standing	Postseason
Independent (1949–1985)
1949	Charles Pacini	3–5			
1950	Bruno Pacini	9–2			
1951	Walt Rooney	8–3			
1952	Walt Rooney	4–8			
1953	Frank Layden	7–5			
1954	Frank Layden	6–3–1			
1955	Frank Layden	2–7			
1956	John DeVincentis	5–6			
1957	Sidney Ludwig	4–7			
1958	Robert Winters	8–4			
1959	James O’Brien	5–6–1			
1960	Benedict Salamone	2–5			
1961	Milton Krum	5–8			
1962	Milton Krum	5–7–1			
1963	Chester Przylucki	5–7			
1964	Edward Donahue	3–8			
1965	Edward Donahue	1–9			
1966	Edward Donahue	3–6			
1967	Joe DeGregorio				
1968	Joe DeGregorio				
1969	Joe DeGregorio				
1970	Joe DeGregorio	5–12			
1971	Joe DeGregorio	16–4			
1972	Joe DeGregorio	21–4			
1973	Bill Bradshaw	12–3			
1974	Bill Bradshaw	13–9			
1975	Paul Smith	29–13–1			
1976	Paul Smith	9–15			
1977	Dan Burgess	10–9			
1978	Bill Bradshaw	9–11			
1979	Bill Bradshaw	5–21–1			
1980	Frank Badolato	11–16			
1981	Frank Badolato	11–16–1			
1982	Frank Badolato/Marty Salanger	13–19			
1983	Marty Salanger	9–13			
1984	Marty Salanger				
1985	Ron Leib	9–22			
Independent:		267–293–6			
Eastern College Athletic Conference (1986–1989)
1986	Ron Leib	9–26	4–10	5th (Upstate New York)	
1987	Ron Leib	8–22	4–13	5th (Upstate New York)	
1988	Ron Leib	12–26	6–9	5th (Upstate New York)	
1989	Jim Mauro	12–19	5–6	3rd (Upstate New York)	
ECAC:		41–93	19–38		
Metro Atlantic Athletic Conference (1990–present)
1990	Jim Mauro	11–22	4–8	t-4th (North)	
1991	Jim Mauro	12–24	5–12	4th (North)	
1992	Jim Mauro	15–18	7–11	3rd (North)	
1993	Jim Mauro	12–19	6–12	4th (North)	
1994	Jim Mauro	9–29	2–16	4th (North)	
1995	Jim Mauro	14–26	3–15	4th (North)	
1996	Jim Mauro	14–20	7–11	3rd (North)	
1997	Jim Mauro	17–21	11–7	1st (North)	MAAC Tournament
1998	Jim Mauro	17–23–1	11–15	t-3rd (North)	
1999	Jim Mauro	13–22–1	11–14	4th (North)	
2000	Jim Mauro	16–25	13–13	6th	
2001	Jim Mauro	25–20	15–11	5th	
2002	Mike McRae	12–34	9–17	8th	
2003	Mike McRae	26–25	16–10	t-3rd	MAAC Tournament
2004	Mike McRae	27–27	16–9	t-2nd	MAAC Tournament
2005	Chris Chernisky	25–28	16–9	4th	MAAC Tournament
2006	Chris Chernisky	28–26	17–10	t-3rd	MAAC Tournament
2007	Chris Chernisky	15–32	3–21	10th	
2008	Chris Chernisky	22–28	10–14	6th	
2009	Rob McCoy	20–35	14–10	t-4th	
2010	Rob McCoy	17–36	13–11	t-5th	
2011	Rob McCoy	8–40	5–19	9th	
2012	Rob McCoy	19–29	7–16	9th	
2013	Rob McCoy	16–38	9–15		
2014	Rob McCoy	20–31	8–14		
2015	Rob McCoy	13–32	8–16		
2016	Rob McCoy	16–37	11–13		
2017	Rob McCoy	24–24	12–12		
2018	Rob McCoy	24–27	13–11		
2019	Rob McCoy	15–33	9–15		
2020	Rob McCoy	6–10			
2021	Rob McCoy	17–17	17-15		
2022	Rob McCoy	22–32	13-11		
2023	Rob McCoy	24–22-1	14-10		
2024	Rob McCoy	38–17	20–4	T–1st	NCAA Regional
MAAC:		613–901–3	346–422		
Total:		921–1277–9			
National champion Postseason invitational champion Conference regular season champion Conference regular season and conference tournament champion Division regular season champion Division regular season and conference tournament champion Conference tournament champion

== Major League Baseball ==
As of 2025, at least 19 former Niagara players have reached Major League Baseball, including Sal Maglie. Niagara has had 25 Major League Baseball draft selections since the draft began in 1965.

Purple Eagles in the Major League Baseball Draft
Year	Player	Round	Team
1969	Michael Balogh	9	Orioles
1971	Douglas Farrell	2	Pirates
1971	Robert Sekel	5	Pirates
1972	Douglas Farrell	3	Pirates
1978	William Purdy	13	Orioles
1983	Mark Gabriel	17	Mets
1984	Mark Gabriel	25	Braves
1989	Raymond Bielanin	27	Dodgers
1996	Carmen Panaro	59	Diamondbacks
2003	Josh McCurdy	24	Orioles
2005	Reed Eastley	13	Mariners
2005	Dan Griffin	5	Giants
2005	James Avery	5	Reds
2006	Jeff Vincent	43	Red Sox
2012	Wynton Bernard	35	Padres
2014	Jordan Schwartz	4	Athletics
2017	Daniel Procopio	10	Angels
2017	Tanner Kirwer	20	Blue Jays
2018	Greg Cullen	15	Braves
2019	Matt Brash	4	Padres
2023	Ryan Birchard	5	Brewers
2023	Brendan Morse	18	Rangers
2024	Ryan Minckler	19	Nationals
2024	Eric Rataczak	16	Marlins
2025	Matt Barr	5	Twins

== See also ==
- List of NCAA Division I baseball programs
