= Mark Hollis (athletic director) =

American sports administrator (born 1962)

Mark Hollis (born September 10, 1962) is an American sports administrator who served as the athletic director at Michigan State University, succeeding Ron Mason on January 1, 2008. Hollis retired on January 31, 2018.

== Career ==
Hollis graduated from Croswell-Lexington High School in Michigan class of 1980. He earned a BA in communication from Michigan State University in 1985 and an MBA from the University of Colorado in 1992. Hollis was a basketball team manager under former head coach Jud Heathcote throughout his undergraduate education at Michigan State. Between his BA and MBA, Hollis worked for the Western Athletic Conference under Commissioner Joseph Kearney, who had previously been athletic director at Michigan State.

Hollis was named athletic director on January 1, 2008. He had been a part of the Michigan State athletic department from 1995 until his retirement on January 31, 2018 in the wake of the USA Gymnastics sex abuse scandal.

Hollis was praised for his marketing abilities, helping to stage unusual athletic contests such as the Cold War, an outdoor ice hockey match-up between rivals Michigan State University and the University of Michigan, as Basketbowl, a 2003 match-up between Michigan State University and the University of Kentucky played at Ford Field, and the 2011 Carrier Classic basketball game aboard the USS Carl Vinson, between Michigan State and North Carolina. Hollis acknowledged the significance of the Rose Bowl in his acceptance speech in 2008 and the Spartans made it to the game in 2014, its first since 1988, while posting an 8-2 record against rival Michigan during his tenure. Hollis also served 5 years on the NCAA Men’s Basketball Committee and was Chairman in 2017. Along with Tom Izzo and Alan Haller, Hollis formed the search committee that hired Mark Dantonio in 2006. Hollis was also responsible for hiring former Eastern Michigan University baseball head coach Jake Boss.
