= Patrick Chun =

South Korean American athletic administrator

Current position
- Title: Athletic director
- Team: Washington
- Conference: Big Ten

Biographical details
- Born: Youngstown, Ohio, U.S.
- Education: Ohio State University; Duquesne University

Administrative career (AD unless noted)
- 2012–2018: Florida Atlantic
- 2018–2024: Washington State
- 2024–present: Washington

Patrick Chun is an American athletic administrator who has been the 17th director of athletics at the University of Washington since March 2024. He was director of athletics at Washington State University from 2018 to 2024, and at Florida Atlantic University from 2012 to 2018.

== Early life and education ==
Chun was born at St. Elizabeth's Health Center in Youngstown, Ohio to a Korean-American family. His parents had immigrated to Ohio from South Korea in 1969 to pursue the American dream. Growing up in Strongsville, Ohio Chun played baseball, basketball, and football through junior high and senior high school. Through childhood, his parents encouraged him to pursue a career as a doctor or lawyer but he wished to remain involved in sports.

Chun received a bachelor's degree in journalism from Ohio State University and a master's degree from Duquesne University in Pittsburgh, Pennsylvania. Upon graduating in 1997, Chun accepted a sports information internship with the athletic department at Ohio State University, where he remained for 15 years.

== Career ==
During Chun's tenure at Ohio State University, athletic director Gene Smith helped Chun make the leap to development and fundraising at Ohio State University. Chun ended up serving as executive associate athletics director at Ohio State University before leaving the university. In July 2012, Chun left Ohio State University to serve as the director of athletics at Florida Atlantic University in Boca Raton, Florida. In February 2018, Chun left Florida Atlantic University to serve as the 14th director of athletics at Washington State University. During the COVID-19 pandemic, Chun co-chaired the Pac-12 Social Justice & Anti-Racism Advisory Group. The following year, he was appointed the National Association of Collegiate Directors of Athletics's third Vice President following the 2021 Convention.

In May 2021, Washington State University agreed to a contract extension with Chun through 2026 that would increase his base salary to $700,000. In March 2024, Chun left Washington State University to serve as the 17th director of athletics at the University of Washington.

== Personal life ==
Chun's wife, Natalie, is also an alumnus of Ohio State University and they have three daughters together.
