= Randy Spetman =

America football player, college athletics administrator

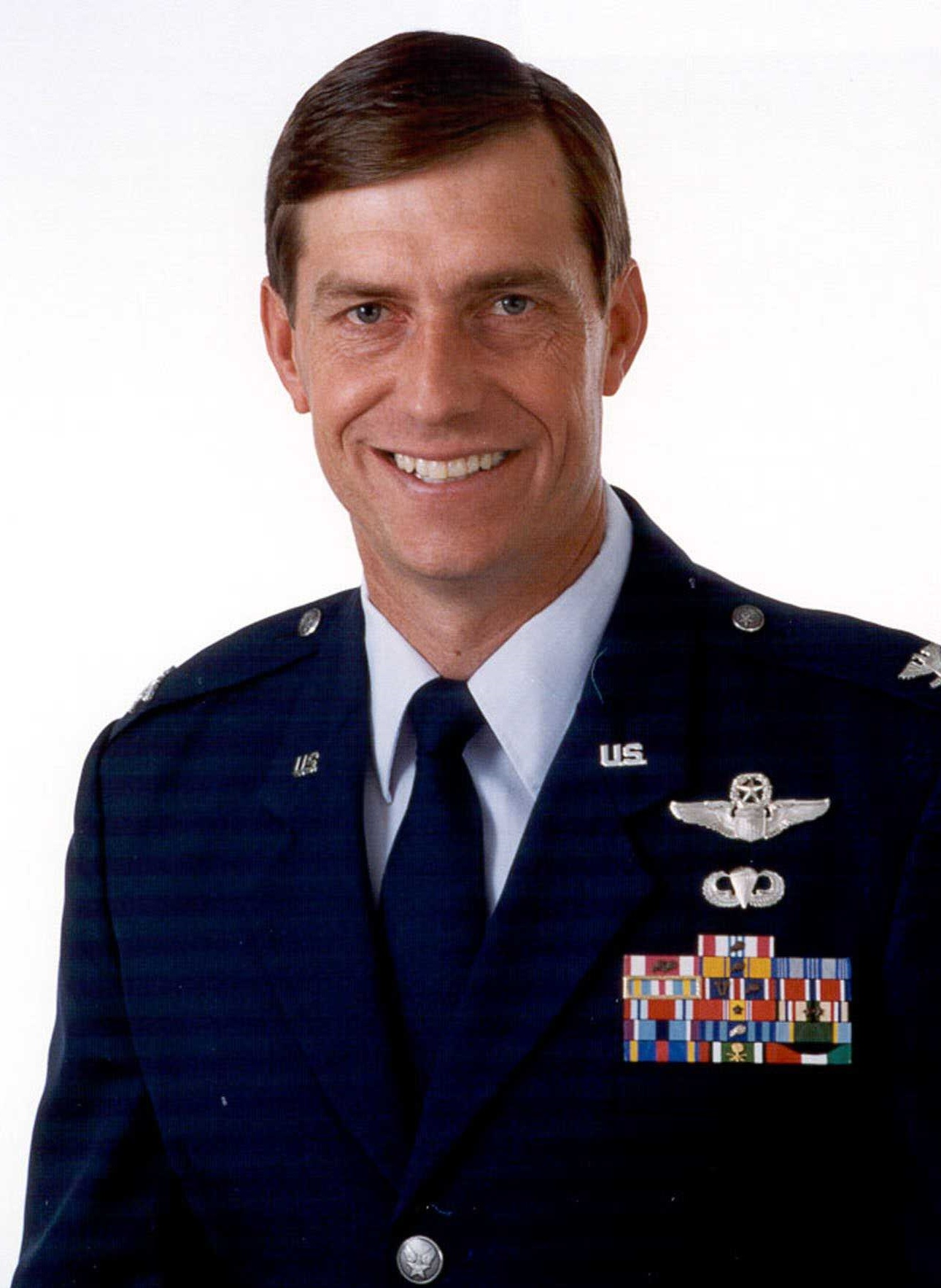
- Air Force photo of Spetman (c. 2000)

Biographical details
- Born: December 30, 1952 (age 73); Council Bluffs, Iowa, U.S.

Playing career

Football
- 1973–1975: Air Force
- Position: Defensive end

Administrative career (AD unless noted)
- 1995–1996: Air Force (associate AD)
- 1996–2003: Air Force
- 2004–2008: Utah State
- 2008–2013: Florida State

Randall William Spetman (born December 30, 1952) is an American college athletic director who was most recently athletic director at Florida State University from 2008 to 2013. Spetman has also been the director of athletics at Utah State University and the United States Air Force Academy. He was a vice president of the National Association of Collegiate Directors of Athletics during the 2009–10 academic year.

== Early life, education, and military career ==
Spetman was born in Council Bluffs, Iowa. He graduated from Abraham Lincoln High School in 1971 and the United States Air Force Academy in 1976. While at the academy, he played at defensive end for the Air Force Falcons football team from 1973 to 1975. Spetman has master's degrees from Central Michigan University and from the Naval War College.

After graduation from the academy, Spetman spent 28 years in the United States Air Force as a pilot. In addition to being an assistant coach for Air Force football, Spetman served in the Air Force in various capacities, including Chief of Bomber Planning in Operations Desert Shield and Desert Storm and Chief of the Command and Control Division, Operations Directorate of the United States European Command in Stuttgart, Germany. Spetman retired as a colonel in April 2004.

== Athletics administration career ==
Beginning in August 1995, Spetman was associate athletic director at Air Force before being promoted to athletic director effective March 1, 1996. In 2000, Spetman hired Joe Scott to be Air Force Falcons men's basketball coach and in 2002 signed Scott through 2008. On October 15, 2003, Spetman announced his retirement effective in December. In March 2004, three months after Spetman's retirement, Scott led Air Force to its first NCAA Tournament appearance in over 40 years.

Utah State University president Kermit Hall hired Spetman on June 18, 2004, to be athletic director effective July 1. By 2007, Utah State had won four WAC championships and had a conference-best 78 percent graduation rate.

Spetman became athletic director of Florida State University on February 4, 2008, hired by president T. K. Wetherell. In July 2008, Florida State hired Lonni Alameda as head softball coach, following the retirement of longtime head coach Joanne Graf. Alameda would go on to win five consecutive ACC Coach of the Year honors from 2013 to 2017 and the 2018 Women's College World Series title. After the resignation of longtime head coach Bobby Bowden, Spetman promoted offensive coordinator Jimbo Fisher as the new Florida State Seminoles football head coach in December 2009. The Tallahassee Democrat reported that Bowden made the decision to retire following a meeting with Wetherell and Spetman. Fisher would take Florida State to three straight bowl victories and two ACC Atlantic Division titles, with top-ten year-end rankings after the 2012 season. On June 5, 2013, new Florida State president Eric Barron reassigned Spetman to a special advisor role for the remainder of his contract that would expire in February 2014.
