= Harry Fouke =

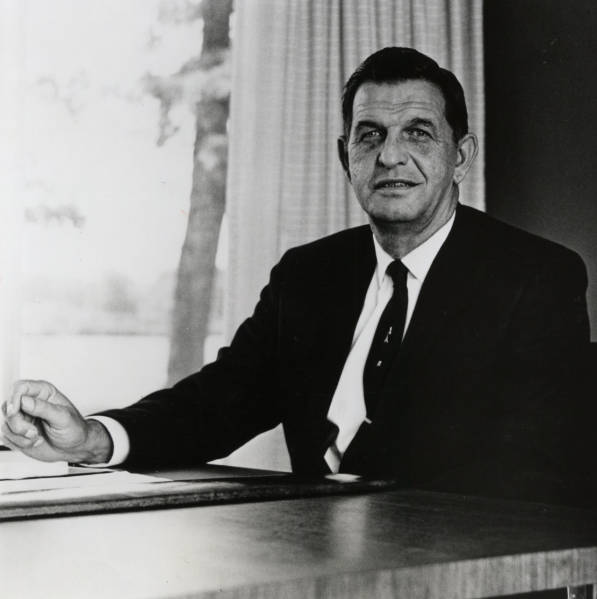

Biographical details
- Born: November 29, 1913; Texarkana, Arkansas, U.S.
- Died: November 5, 1992 (aged 78); Houston, Texas, U.S.

Playing career
- 1932–1934: Rice

Coaching career (HC unless noted)

Football
- 1935–1941: San Antonio Technical HS (TX)
- 1942–1944: Thomas Jefferson HS (TX)

Golf
- 1946–1951: Houston

Administrative career (AD unless noted)
- 1945–1979: Houston

Accomplishments and honors

Awards
- Corbett Award (1979)

Harry Haydon Fouke (November 29, 1913 – November 5, 1992) was the first athletic director at the University of Houston, and served in the position from 1945 to 1979. Fouke attended Main Avenue High School in San Antonio, and graduated from Rice University in 1934, where he played varsity football. Fouke served as head football coach for San Antonio Technical High School and Thomas Jefferson High School in San Antonio throughout the rest of the 1930s and early 1940s. He later became the director of athletics for the San Antonio Public Schools System, the Houston Independent School District, and ultimately the University of Houston.

At Houston, Fouke oversaw the introduction of the football program, baseball program, men's basketball program, and the women's basketball program among others.

During Fouke's last year at Houston, he was awarded the Corbett Award by the National Association of Collegiate Directors of Athletics. Fouke was also a former president of the organization from 1974 to 1975. From 1962 until 1999, Fouke was the namesake of the Fouke Athletic Building on the campus of the University of Houston. It was demolished for the placement of the Athletics/Alumni Building.
