= Soenen et al v. Brown =

Legal case in Rhode Island

Soenen et al. v. Brown is an ongoing legal case filed in 2021 in the Rhode Island District Court. The case involves numerous current and former Brown University students who allege the university mishandled sexual misconduct complaints in violation of Title IX of the Education Amendments of 1972 between 1991 and 2024.

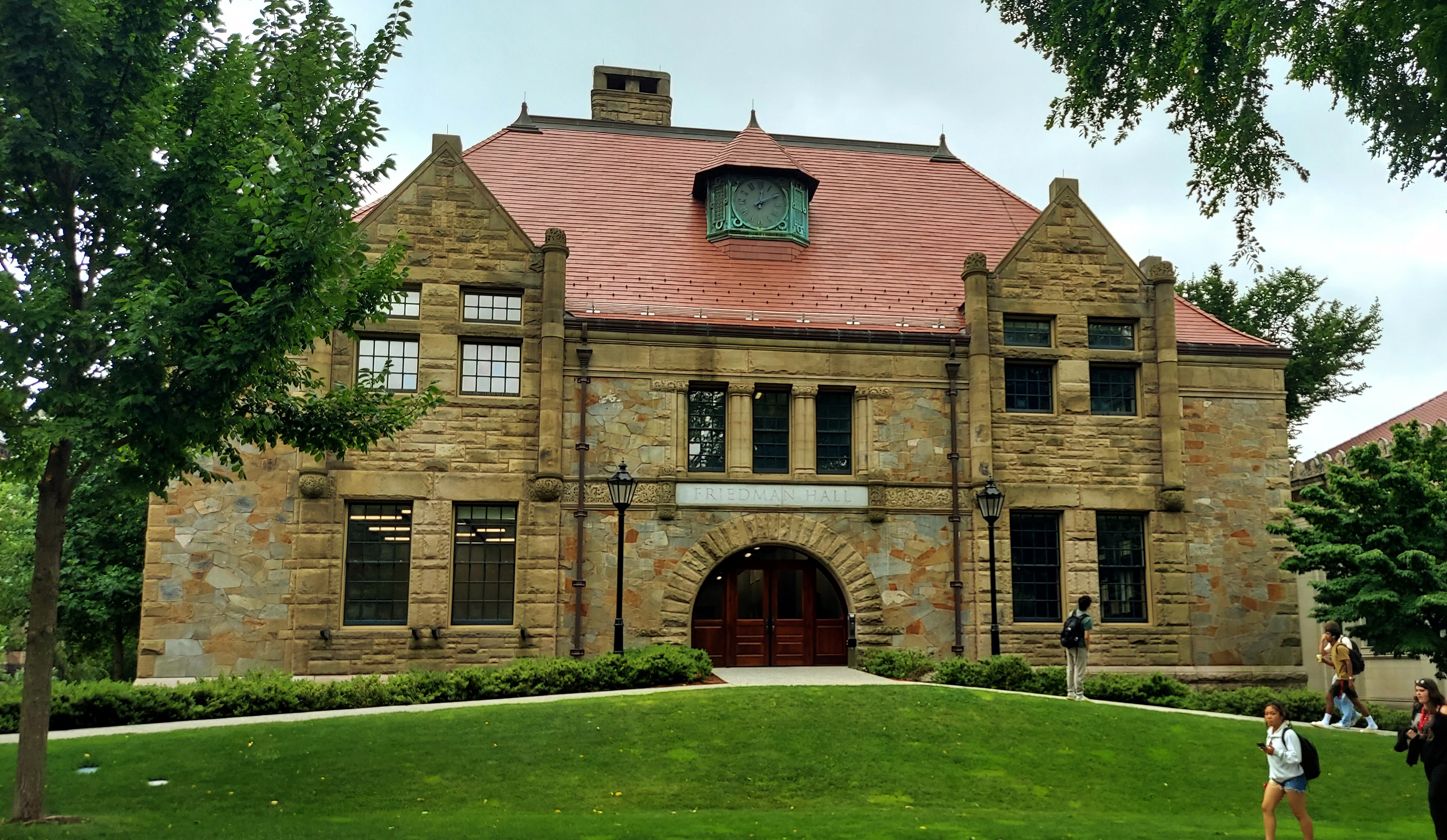
Brown University in Providence, Rhode Island

The case adds to a growing body of litigation pointing out concerns in how higher education institutions respond to harassment and sexual assault. It has drawn national attention for its relevance to Title IX compliance, institutional accountability, and the rights of students.

== Summary ==
Filed by a group of Brown University students, including Katiana Soenen, Carter Woodruff, Taja Hirata-Epstein, and Chloe Burns, the case alleges that Brown University failed to properly investigate, respond to, and prevent sexual misconduct on campus. The court allowed multiple Title IX claims to proceed after an initial motion to dismiss. The case was later split into individual lawsuits and remains in progress as of 2025.

== Historical context ==
The Soenen et al. case is not Brown University's first encounter with a Title IX lawsuit. In 1991, Amy Cohen, co-captain of the women's gymnastics team, as well as twelve other female athletes, filed a lawsuit against the university after the institution announced funding cuts to four varsity sports, including women's volleyball and gymnastics. The student athletes claimed these cuts violated Title IX provisions against sex-based discrimination in federally funded education programs. This led to the filing of Cohen v. Brown University in April 1992.

In 1996, a district judge ruled that Brown University was in violation of Title IX. After an extended period of appeals, the parties reached a settlement in 1998. The agreement required Brown to guarantee the proportion of female athletes remained within 3.5 points of the ratio of female undergraduates. If Brown University decided to terminate a women's sport or add a men's sport, the allowed variance would go down to 2.25 percentage points. This settlement, known as the Joint Agreement, remained in effect until August 31, 2024, following a new settlement met in 2020.

== Legal proceedings ==
In August 2021, four students, Katiana Soenen, Carter Woodruff, Taja Hirata-Epstein, and Chloe Burns, filed a class-action lawsuit against Brown University. The plaintiffs claimed that Brown neglected to protect students from abuse and sexual harassment, including incidents of unsolicited recording, abusive relationships, assault, and rape. They also alleged the university actively prevented or discouraged the reporting of such harm.

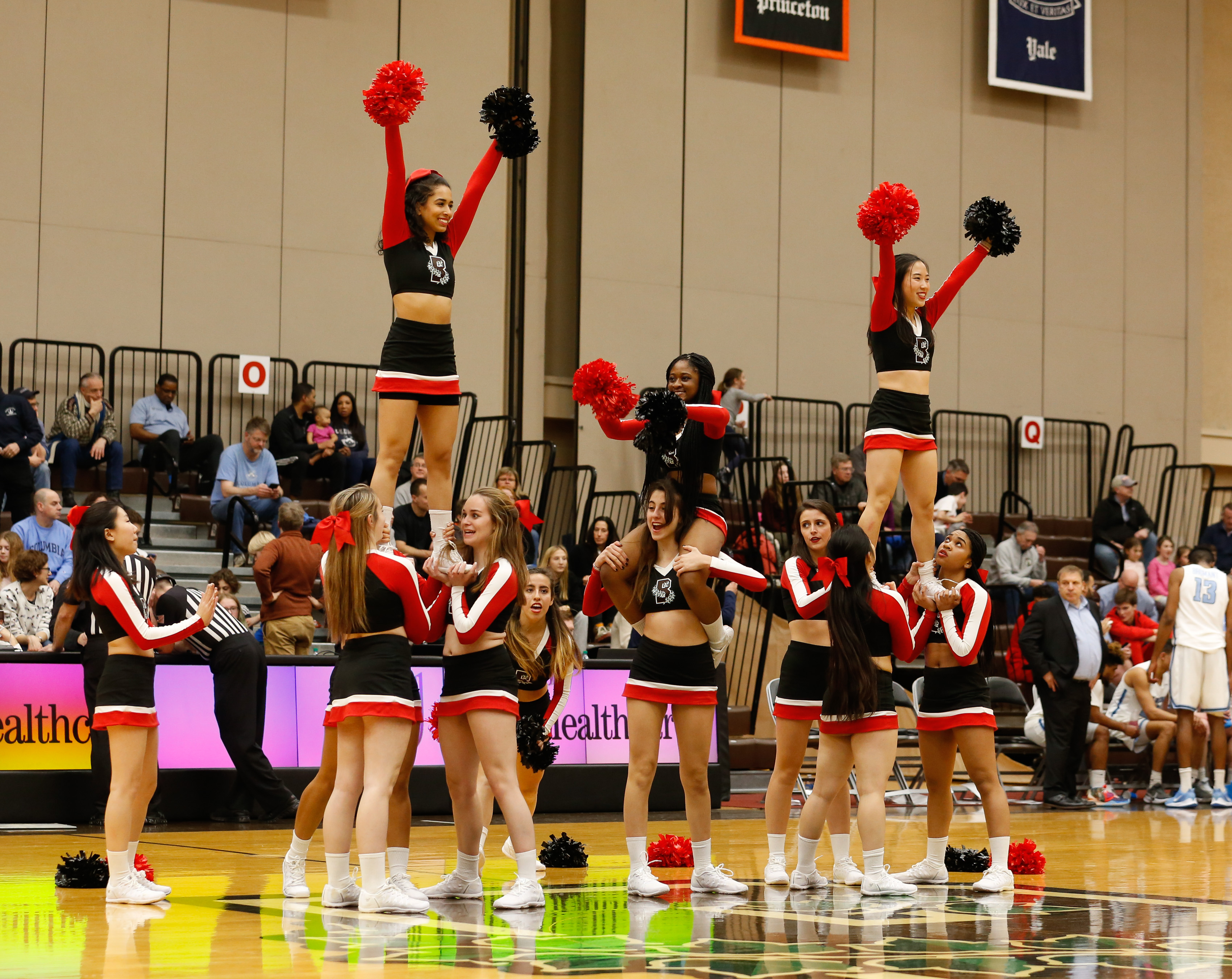
Brown University Cheerleaders

In January 2022, the complaint was amended to include three additional plaintiffs, Emma Dennis-Knieriem and two anonymous individuals referred to as "Jane Doe," an undergraduate and a Ph.D. student. Not long after, Carter Woodruff withdrew from the case for personal reasons.

In March 2022, Brown University filed a motion to dismiss the case, arguing that some claims were barred by the statute of limitations and that the plaintiffs failed to argue plausible claims under Title IX and state law. Brown also contended that the plaintiffs' allegations did not meet the requirements for a class-action lawsuit.

On October 18, 2022, the court partially approved Brown's motion to dismiss. The decision terminated the possibility of monetary relief for all female students and dismissed all claims by plaintiff Chloe Burns. The court allowed the remaining claims, which focused on the presumed mishandling of sexual misconduct complaints by Brown's Title IX Office, to continue.

In January 2023, Brown filed a motion to sever the joint lawsuit into individual cases. The court allowed this motion on January 27, resulting in the division of the case into six separate lawsuits, with the two anonymous plaintiffs remaining in a joint case. Consequently, Chloe Burns filed a new complaint on February 28, 2022, delivering the total number of cases stemming from the original lawsuit to seven.

== Outcome ==
As of 2025, no final settlement or ruling has been filed in the divided proceedings. The lawsuit continues, and the outcomes will more than likely influence Title IX enforcement policies at Brown and potentially other universities nationwide. Administrative adjustments to Title IX are also pending, which may influence the outcome of the case.
