= Jim Corbett (athletic director) =

James Joseph Corbett (November 10, 1919 – January 29, 1967) was an American sports administrator who served as athletics director at Louisiana State University from 1954 until his death in 1967.

== Biography ==
Corbett was born in Woburn, Massachusetts and attended high school in nearby Arlington. He graduated from Southeastern Louisiana College in 1944.

In addition to his role at LSU, Corbett also served as the first president of the National Association of Collegiate Directors of Athletics from 1965–1966, and for more than 10 years was a member of the Sugar Bowl Executive Committee.

He died of a massive heart attack in New Orleans, aged only 47. LSU President John A. Hunter said, "Not only is it a tragedy as far as LSU is concerned, but it is a tragic personal loss because we all loved him so much. I think he ran one of the most efficient athletic departments in the United States and we never had an employee more dedicated to LSU than Jim was."

== Legacy ==
The National Association of Collegiate Directors of Athletics (NACDA) established the Corbett Award, which is presented annually "to the collegiate administrator who through the years has most typified Corbett's devotion to intercollegiate athletics and worked unceasingly for its betterment." The first recipient was Bernie Moore, commissioner emeritus for the Southeastern Conference.

Three months after Corbett's death, the Sugar Bowl Executive Committee established a memorial award in his name. It honored the most outstanding male or female collegiate athlete of the year in Louisiana, as selected by a panel of Louisiana's sports journalists.
