= Matt Spatafora =

Canadian baseball coach (born 1981)

Current position
- Title: Head coach
- Team: Niagara
- Conference: MAAC
- Record: 19–27

Biographical details
- Born: November 21, 1981 (age 44); Toronto, Ontario, Canada
- Education: Texarkana College, University of Arkansas at Little Rock

Playing career
- 2000–2002: Texarkana
- 2003–2004: Arkansas–Little Rock
- 2005–2007: Guelph Royals
- Position: Infielder

Coaching career (HC unless noted)
- 2005: Arkansas–Little Rock (student assistant)
- 2009–2011: Mary Ward HS
- 2012–2024: Niagara (assistant)
- 2025–present: Niagara

Head coaching record
- Overall: 19–27 (college)

Matt Spatafora (born November 21, 1981) is a Canadian baseball coach, currently serving as the head baseball coach at Niagara University. After attending Texarkana College from 2000 to 2002, Spatafora attended college at the University of Arkansas at Little Rock and played on the Arkansas–Little Rock Trojans baseball team from 2003 to 2004. After graduating from Arkansas–Little Rock in 2004, Spatafora played for the Guelph Royals of the Intercounty Baseball League from 2005 to 2007. After serving as a student assistant baseball coach at the University of Arkansas at Little Rock in 2005 and as the head baseball coach at Mary Ward Catholic Secondary School from 2009 to 2011, Spatafora served as an assistant baseball coach at Niagara University from 2012 to 2024. Following the resignation of head baseball coach Rob McCoy at the conclusion of the 2024 NCAA Division I baseball season, Spatafora was named interim head baseball coach at Niagara University on June 20, 2024 before being named to the job on a permanent basis on June 28, 2024.

== Head coaching record ==
Record table
Season	Team	Overall	Conference	Standing	Postseason
Niagara Purple Eagles (Metro Atlantic Athletic Conference) (2025–present)
2025	Niagara	19–27	14–15	8th	MAAC Tournament
Niagara:		19–27	14–15		
Total:		19–27			
