= Bill Bradshaw (athletic director) =

American athletic administrator

Playing career
- 1966–1969: La Salle

Coaching career (HC unless noted)
- 1972: Niagara (assistant)
- 1973–1974: Niagara

Administrative career (AD unless noted)
- 1978–1986: La Salle
- 1986–2002: DePaul
- 2002–2013: Temple
- 2016–2017: La Salle (interim AD)
- 2017–2019: La Salle

Bill Bradshaw is a former American college athletics administrator and college baseball coach. He served as athletic director at La Salle University from 1978 to 1986, DePaul University from 1986 to 2002, Temple University from 2002 to 2013, and again at La Salle University from 2016 to 2019.

== Education ==
Bradshaw attended college at La Salle University, where he played on the school's baseball team.

== Career ==
Bradshaw was named interim athletic director at La Salle on March 9, 2016, before being named permanent athletic director on March 28, 2017. Bradshaw retired as athletic director at La Salle on June 30, 2019.

== Head coaching record ==
Record table
Season	Team	Overall	Conference	Standing	Postseason
Niagara Purple Eagles (Independent) (1973–1974)
1973	Niagara	12–3			
1974	Niagara	13–9			
Niagara:		25–12			
Total:		25–12			
National champion Postseason invitational champion Conference regular season champion Conference regular season and conference tournament champion Division regular season champion Division regular season and conference tournament champion Conference tournament champion
