= 2019 Fiesta Bowl =

The 2019 Fiesta Bowl may refer to:

- 2019 Fiesta Bowl (January) – January 1, 2019, game between the LSU Tigers and UCF Knights
- 2019 Fiesta Bowl (December) – December 28, 2019, College Football Playoff semifinal game between the Clemson Tigers and Ohio State Buckeyes
