= Stan Marshall =

English footballer

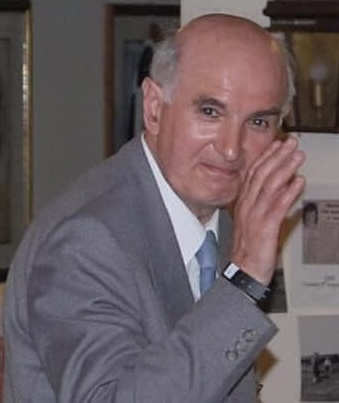

Personal information
- Full name: Stanley Kenneth Marshall
- Date of birth: 20 April 1946 (age 80)
- Place of birth: Goole, East Riding of Yorkshire, England
- Position: Forward

Senior career*
Years	Team	Apps	(Gls)
1963–1966	Middlesbrough	2	(0)
1966–1968	Notts County	49	(17)
1968–1969	Dunstable Town	?	(?)
1969–1973	Cambridge City	235	(144)
1973–1975	Dartford	?	(?)
1973–1974	Granville Parramatta	27	(21)
1975–1978	Chesham United	?	(?)
1976	Granville Parramatta	?	(?)
- * Club domestic league appearances and goals

Stanley Marshall (born 20 April 1946) was an English footballer who played centre-forward.

== Professional career ==
Marshall began his professional career with Middlesbrough F.C., joining the club in August 1963. During the 1965–66 season, Marshall made two appearances in the Football League Second Division. On 22 October 1965, Middlesbrough faced Norwich City and suffered a 0–1 defeat. On 29 January 1966, Middlesbrough played against Manchester City, losing 1–3.

In 1966, Marshall moved to Notts County, where he enjoyed success by scoring 17 goals in 49 Football League matches. However, unexpected events can occur in professional football, and Southern League club Dunstable Town made an offer for Marshall that County accepted. This led Marshall to Bedfordshire. At Creasey Park, Marshall formed a formidable partnership up front with another young striker, Bill Garner. Together, they struck fear into Southern League defenders during the 1968–69 season. Eventually, both players made further moves—Bill transferred to Bedford Town, and Marshall moved on to City.

After his time at Notts County, Marshall moved to non-league football, where he made a significant impact at Dunstable Town, Cambridge City, and Dartford. His former teammate, Cliff Jones, a winger for Tottenham Hotspur and Wales, remembered Marshall as a prolific goal scorer. Marshall played between 1969 and 1973, scoring 144 goals in 235 games for Cambridge City. Jones noted that Marshall consistently scored between 20 and 30 goals each season for Cambridge City. Given his impressive performances at the non-league level, he was surprised that Marshall did not attract interest from League clubs.
