= Barbara Hedges =

Former collegiate athletic director

- Born: Glendale, Arizona, U.S.
- Education: BA, 1963, MA, 1971, Arizona State University
- Spouse: John Hedges (m. 1957)

Barbara A. Hedges (nee Canney) is the former athletic director at the University of Washington. Hedges was the longest-serving woman athletic director among NCAA Division I programs in the nation.

== Early life and education ==
Hedges was the youngest of nine children in Glendale, Arizona and played semi-professional softball with the A-1 Queens. She was raised by a single father after her mother died when she was an infant. Upon completing her Bachelor of Arts degree she immediately accepted a gymnastics coach position at a high school in Cheyenne, Wyoming. She returned to Arizona for her Master's degree and accepted an associate athletic director at the University of Southern California (USC) in 1974.

== Career ==
=== USC ===
Hedges served as the associate athletic director in charge of women's sports at USC from 1973 until 1985 when she was also promoted the director of men's sports program. In this role, she collaborated with Judith Holland at the University of California, Los Angeles, to jointly market USC and UCLA women's sports. In 1989, she was promoted to senior associate director of athletics at USC. In this role, she designed a $2 raffle for a Mercedes that brought in more than $100,000 each year for women's sports and created "Women of Troy," a group of more than 300 donors who give $1,500 each annually to the program. By the time she left USC, women sports had won 13 national team championships, 68 individual national championships, and graduated an estimated 150 All-American and 36 Olympians.

=== UW ===
Hedges left USC in 1991 to become the first female athletic director in charge at a football-playing NCAA Division I school at the University of Washington (UW). She was chosen for the position due to the advocacy of William Gerberding, then the president at Washington, as the Board preferred male candidates. Upon accepting the position, she generated revenue through UW's football program in order to fund both men's and women's sports teams. After signing a three-year contract with UW, worth $110,000 per year, Hedges hired Teresa Wilson to lead the new women's softball program. While serving as UW's athletic director, Hedges also became the first woman to serve as president of the National Association of Collegiate Directors of Athletics and sit on the board of directors for the National Football Foundation. She also served as president of the Council of Collegiate Women Athletic Administrators and the Western Collegiate Athletic Association. In recognition of her achievements, Hedges was the recipient of the 2000 Honda Award of Merit.

In her second year as athletic director, Hedges oversaw a scandal involving UW quarterback Billy Joe Hobert who had accepted a $50,000 loan. She subsequently hired a law firm to investigate the offenses and Pac-10 prohibited UW football for two seasons in their conference. As a result of the sanctions, football coach Don James resigned in protest and the athletics department estimated they would lose out $1.4 million in TV revenue. She hired Jim Lambright following James's resignation but fired him after the Huskies went 6–6 for the 1998 season.

Hedges then hired football coach Rick Neuheisel who then led the Huskies to a 2001 Rose Bowl victory. However, within weeks of his arrival, he was under investigation for gambling on the NCAA basketball tournament. It was later revealed that he had placed bets of more than $5,000 in a gambling pool for NCAA basketball tournaments in 2001 and 2002. She subsequently fired Neuheisel on July 25, 2003, who then filed a wrongful termination lawsuit against UW and the NCAA. The case was settled out of court on March 7, 2005, with Neuheisel receiving a $3 million payment. That was not the only controversy regarding the 2001 Rose Bowl as the Washington State Executive Ethics Board agreed that Richard L. McCormick and Hedges violated provisions of the state's Executive Ethics Law while traveling. She subsequently promoted offensive coordinator Keith Gilbertson to succeed Neuheisel but later admonished him for betting in a $5 NCAA basketball pool.

Hedges resigned from her position in 2004 following more controversy with men's coaches. She terminated the contract of softball coach Teresa Wilson after there were accusations that he ordered the physician to hand out painkillers and medications to softball players without first examining them. Upon her retirement, Hedges became the longest-serving female athletic director among NCAA Division I programs.

=== Post-retirement ===
Following her retirement, Hedges moved to Palm Desert, California and became a member of Ironwood Country Club. She was honored by the National Association of Collegiate Women Athletics Administrators and was selected to be the recipient of the James J. Corbett Memorial Award. She returned to USC in 2013 to serve as co-chair of the athletic department's Heritage Initiative fundraising effort.

Hedges was inducted into the USC Athletic Hall of Fame in 2012 and the Pac-12 Hall of Honor in 2020.

== Personal life ==
Hedges married her high school sweetheart John in 1957.
