= Gene Smith (athletic director) =

American football player, college athletics administrator

Biographical details
- Born: Cleveland, Ohio, U.S.

Playing career
- 1973–1977: Notre Dame
- Position: Defensive end

Administrative career (AD unless noted)
- 1986–1993: Eastern Michigan
- 1993–2000: Iowa State
- 2000–2005: Arizona State
- 2005–2024: Ohio State

Accomplishments and honors

Awards
- Corbett Award (2016); NCAA Gerald R. Ford Award (2025)

Gene Smith is a former American college administrator and former college football player and coach who was most recently senior vice president and Athletic Director for Ohio State University.

He was named the university's eighth athletic director on March 5, 2005. Prior to his tenure at Ohio State, he served as athletic director for Arizona State, Eastern Michigan, and Iowa State.

== Early life/playing and coaching career ==
A native of Cleveland, Ohio, Smith played defensive end for four years at Notre Dame including the 1973 Notre Dame Fighting Irish football team that won the AP National Championship. He graduated from Notre Dame in 1977, becoming the first member of his family to graduate from college. That year, he became an assistant coach of the Fighting Irish football team, which would go on to win the Undisputed National Championship.

== Administrative career ==
Smith is the eighth person to hold the athletics director position at Ohio State. He previously served as director of athletics at Arizona State, Iowa State and Eastern Michigan universities and is entering his 33rd year in the role.

Smith was identified as one of Black Enterprise's "50 most powerful African-Americans in sports". He has previous affiliations with the NCAA Management Council, the NCAA committee on Infractions, the Rose Bowl Management Committee, and the NCAA Football Rules Committee. Smith was named to the NCAA Men's Division I Basketball Committee in 2006 and became the chair in 2010.

In January 2014 Smith was promoted to senior vice president of the university where he continues in his duties as athletic director, while also having an expanding role in other areas of the university.

During Smith’s tenure, Ohio State has dominated Big Ten Conference play, with 105 teams and 331 individual conference championships. In addition, more than 90 percent of graduating seniors earned jobs, enrolled in graduate school or moved on to professional sports. On the national stage, Ohio State teams have won 24 teams and 104 individual national championships during Smith’s tenure and collected 1,586 All-America honors.

Along with his development team, Smith has recently raised more than $130 million for the construction of the Schumaker Complex, Covelli Arena and Ty Tucker Tennis Center and a renovation at the Woody Hayes Athletic Center – the Wandell Family Player’s Suite.

Smith oversees a total of 525 employees in athletics and business advancement, with an annual budget of $300 million, and a football program with a $1.5 billion valuation, as estimated by The Wall Street Journal. Under Smith's leadership, the program's organizational culture was recognized by Forbes as “one of the best ten organizations to work for in sports” and was the only college program on its list.

Smith currently serves on the Boards of Directors of the Columbus Sports Commission, Columbus Cub, Columbus Arena Management and Columbus Museum of Art.

He announced he would be retiring effective June 30, 2024.

== Personal life ==
Smith is the father of four children, and is a devout Catholic.

== Awards and honors ==
=== Player ===
- 1973 AP National Championship (with Notre Dame)

=== Coach ===
- 1977 Undisputed National Championship (as an assistant coach with Notre Dame)

=== Administrator ===
- Nine NCAA National Championships in various sports (as OSU athletic director)
- 2010 Carl Maddox Sport Management Award
- 2016 James J. Corbett Memorial Award
