= David Roach (athletic director) =

Current position
- Team: Roger Williams University Swim

Biographical details
- Born: September 1949 (age 77)
- Education: Springfield College

Playing career
- 1967–1971: Springfield
- Position: Swimming

Coaching career (HC unless noted)
- 1978–1986: Brown
- 1986–1990: Tennessee
- 2021-Current: RWU

Administrative career (AD unless noted)
- 1990–2004: Brown
- 2004–2012: Colgate
- 2012–2020: Fordham

David T. Roach (born September 1949) is a former American college athletics administrator. Roach served as athletic director at Fordham University from 2012 to 2020, as athletic director at Colgate University from 2004 to 2012, as athletic director at Brown University from 1990 to 2004, as head swimming coach at the University of Tennessee from 1986 to 1990, and as head swimming coach at Brown University from 1978 to 1986. Roach attended college at Springfield College, where he competed on the school's swimming team. Roach was named athletic director at Fordham University on September 26, 2012.

On April 3, 2020, Roach announced his retirement, effective June 30, 2020. In his spare time during retirement he is assistant coaching for the Roger Williams University Swimming Team.
